= Cortinarius sinapivelus =

Scientific classification
- Kingdom: Fungi
- Division: Basidiomycota
- Class: Agaricomycetes
- Order: Agaricales
- Family: Cortinariaceae
- Genus: Cortinarius
- Species: C. sinapivelus

Binomial name
- Cortinarius sinapivelus Danks, T.Lebel & Vernes (2010)
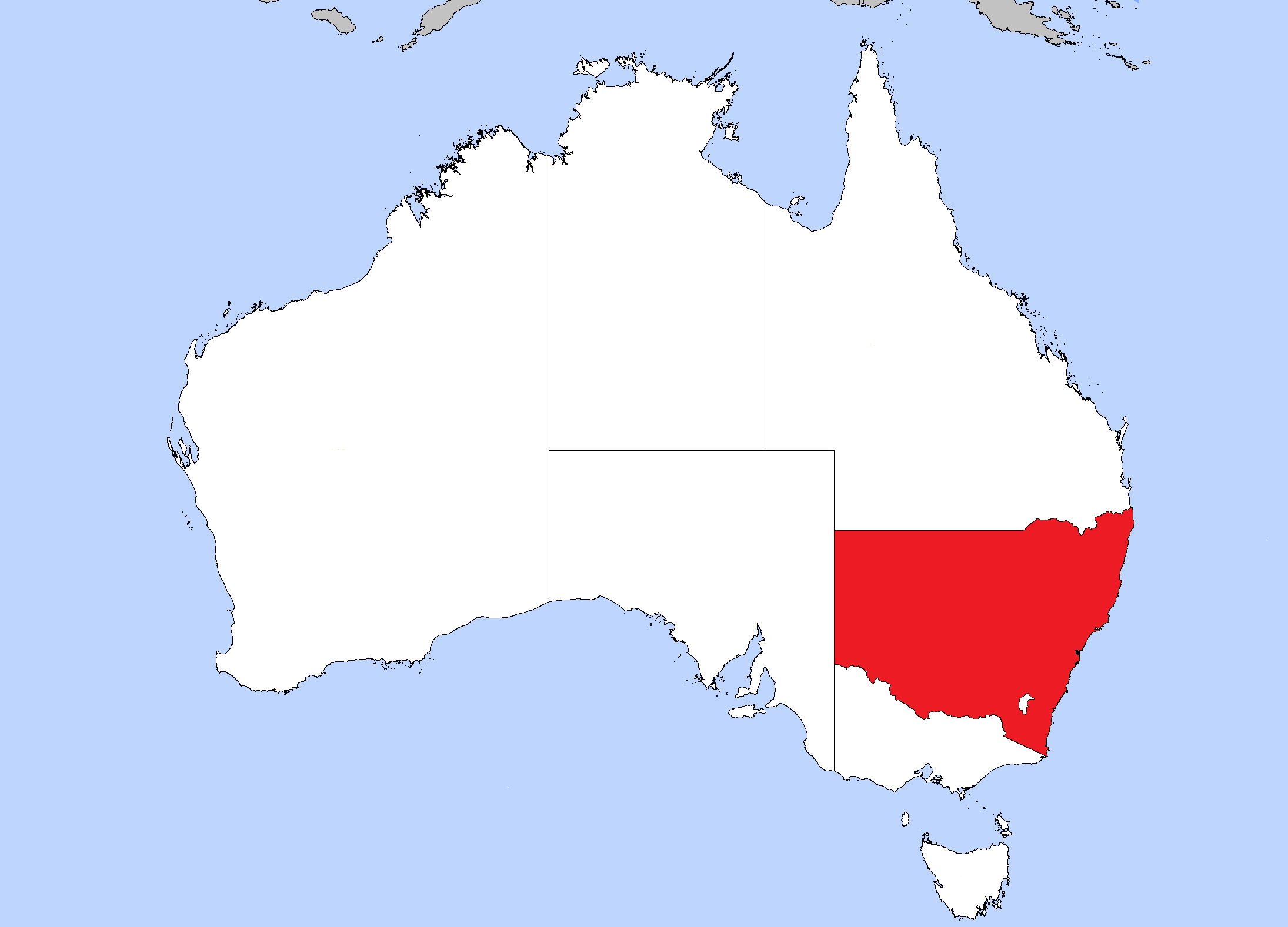
- Known only from New South Wales, Australia

Species of fungus

Cortinarius sinapivelus is a species of truffle-like fungus in the family Cortinariaceae. Known only from New South Wales, it was described as new to science in 2010.

== Taxonomy ==
The species was first described scientifically by mycologists Karl Vernes, Melissa Danks, and Teresa Lebel in a 2010 issue of the journal Persoonia. The type collection was made near Waterfall Way, New South Wales (Australia) in July 2007. Molecular analysis indicates that Cortinarius sinapivelus belongs in the section Splendidi of the genus Cortinarius, and is closely related to the Australian agarics C. persplendidus and C. erythrocephalus. The specific epithet sinapivelus is derived from the Latin words sinapis (mustard) and velus (veil) and refers to the mustard-coloured veil.

== Description ==
Cortinarius sinapivelus has sequestrate fruit bodies, so its spores are not forcibly discharged from the basidia, and it remains enclosed during all stages of development. The shape of the caps is convex to roughly spherical with a flattened top, and they measure 0.6–1.5 cm (0.2–0.6 in) long by 1.2–2.1 cm (0.47–0.83 in) in diameter. The margin of the cap attaches to the stipe by a thick, cobweb-like partial veil. The colour of the outer skin of the cap (the pellis) is pale tan-brown; the surface is finely hairy. Remnants of the yellow universal veil cover some of the cap surface; they are readily rubbed off with handling. The flesh is translucent yellow-tan and 0.5–3.0 mm (0.02–0.1 in) thick. The internal spore-bearing tissue of the cap (the hymenophore) is pale cinnamon brown at first, but darkens later as the spores mature. It has irregular, wrinkled chambers that are 0.5–2 mm in diameter. A slender, bright yellow stipe extends into the cap through its entire length; it measures 18–35 mm (0.7–1.4 in) long by 6–8 mm (0.2–0.3 in) thick. The thick cortina-like partial veil is mustard yellow, and persists between the margin of the cap and the stipe. Fruit bodies have no distinctive taste or odour. The spores are broadly egg-shaped and measure 8.9–10.2 by 6.5–7.4 μm. They are covered with nodules up to 0.5 μm high. The thin-walled basidia (spore-bearing cells) are hyaline (translucent), club-shaped to cylindrical, four-spored, and have dimensions of 26–29 by 7–8 μm. There are clamp connections present in the hyphae of the cap.

== Habitat and distribution ==
Cortinarius sinapivelus is known only from the type collection. The fruit bodies were found in the ground under litterfall on the Kaputar Plateau in subalpine grassy woodland. Associated plant species were Eucalyptus dalrympleana and E. pauciflora.

== See also ==
- List of Cortinarius species
