= Thaxterogaster pallidirimosus =

Scientific classification
- Kingdom: Fungi
- Division: Basidiomycota
- Class: Agaricomycetes
- Order: Agaricales
- Family: Cortinariaceae
- Genus: Thaxterogaster
- Species: T. pallidirimosus

Binomial name
- Thaxterogaster pallidirimosus (Kytöv., Liimat. & Niskanen) Niskanen & Liimat. (2022)

Synonyms
- Cortinarius pallidirimosus Kytöv., Liimat. & Niskanen (2014)

Species of mushroom-forming fungus

Thaxterogaster pallidirimosus is a species of mushroom-forming fungus in the family Cortinariaceae, first described in 2014 as a member of genus Cortinarius before being reclassified in 2022. It is characterized by its medium-sized fruit bodies with whitish to cream, hygrophanous caps that develop brownish-yellow centres and streaks as they age, and club-shaped to nearly cylindrical stipes that are initially white before turning pale brown. This fungus is found throughout Fennoscandia, Russia, and parts of the United States (Oregon), where it grows on the ground in boreal, mesic, and mixed forests, often in association with birch trees.

== Taxonomy ==
The fungus was described as new to science in 2014 and classified as Cortinarius pallidirimosus from specimens collected in Finland. The type specimen was collected on 17 August 1995 by I. Kytövuori (collection no. 95‑585) at Tsieskuljohka, near Kevo in the municipality of Utsjoki, Inari, within a mesic heath forest dominated by Betula and Pinus, with occasional moist depressions. The holotype (H6035694) is preserved at the herbarium of Helsinki University (H), and an isotype (duplicate) is housed at the New York Botanical Garden (NY).

The fungus was classified in the subgenus Phlegmacium of the large mushroom-forming fungal genus Cortinarius. The specific epithet pallidirimosus refers to the pale, streaked cap. Thaxterogaster caesiophylloides is a closely related sister species. In 2022 the species was transferred from Cortinarius and reclassified into the newly erected genus Thaxterogaster based on genomic data.

== Description ==
Thaxterogaster pallidirimosus produces medium‑sized fruit bodies with a pileus 3–9 cm broad, initially hemispherical to convex before expanding. The cap surface is viscid when moist and very finely fibrillose, appearing whitish to cream in young specimens, with a brownish‑yellow centre that turns more ochraceous with age and displays hygrophanous streaks as it dries. The gills (lamellae} are emarginate at the stipe attachment, crowded, and shift from pale greyish‑brown in youth to pale brown at maturity. The stipe measures 6–13 cm in length and 0.7–1.5 cm thick near the apex, widening to 1.5–2.5 cm at the base; it is club-shaped (clavate) to nearly cylindrical, whitish when fresh, then very pale brown with age. A sparse white universal veil may leave fragments on young specimens. The flesh (context) is white and emits a honey‑like odour. In dried specimens (Latin: specimina exsiccata) as deposited in herbaria the pileus ranges from cream to ochre‑brown—darker centrally, lighter towards the margin—with the stipe often paler than the cap.

Under the microscope, spores measure 8.6–10.7 by 5.2–6.1 μm and are almond‑shaped to almond‑ellipsoid, their surfaces unevenly to coarsely verrucose and staining slightly dextrinoid in Melzer's reagent. Basidia are four‑spored, clavate, 24–36 by 7.5–9 μm and nearly colourless. The trama comprises pale yellowish, smooth hyphae with a granulose‑guttulate appearance, occasionally bearing small mounds of colourless crystals. At the stipe apex, hyphae are similarly pale yellowish and smooth. The pileipellis features an epicutis with a clear slimy layer over smooth, very thin (1.5–3 μm wide) colourless hyphae, underlain by a hypoderm of very pale brownish to almost colourless cells.

== Habitat and distribution ==
The fungus is found throughout Fennoscandia, in Russia, and in Oregon (United States). It fruits on the ground singly or in small groups in boreal forest, mesic forest, and mixed forests with birch.
