= Thaxterogaster talimultiformis =

Scientific classification
- Domain: Eukaryota
- Kingdom: Fungi
- Division: Basidiomycota
- Class: Agaricomycetes
- Order: Agaricales
- Family: Cortinariaceae
- Genus: Thaxterogaster
- Species: T. talimultiformis

Binomial name
- Thaxterogaster talimultiformis (Kytöv., Liimat., Niskanen, A.F.S.Taylor & Seslı) Niskanen & Liimat. (2022)

Synonyms
- Cortinarius talimultiformis Kytöv., Liimat., Niskanen, A.F.S.Taylor & Seslı (2014)

Species of mushroom-forming fungus

Thaxterogaster talimultiformis is a species of mushroom-producing fungus in the family Cortinariaceae, originally described as Cortinarius talimultiformis in 2014 before being reclassified to the genus Thaxterogaster in 2022. The mushroom produces caps measuring 4–12 cm across that range from ochre-yellow to red-brown with a viscid surface, pale grey to greyish brown gills, and a white stipe that often forms a club shape or slightly bulbous base. Its species epithet talimultiformis refers to its shared features with the related species T. multiformis and T. talus. Common throughout North and Central Europe and also recorded in Turkey's eastern Black Sea region, this fungus grows in hemiboreal to boreal coniferous woodland, particularly with spruce and fir trees on calcareous soils.

== Taxonomy ==
The species was described in 2014 and classified as Cortinarius talimultiformis. It was placed in the subgenus Phlegmacium of the large mushroom genus Cortinarius. The specific epithet talimultiformis refers to the similar features it shares with species Thaxterogaster multiformis and T. talus.

In 2022 the species was transferred from Cortinarius and reclassified as Thaxterogaster talimultiformis based on genomic data.

== Description ==
The cap (pileus) of Thaxterogaster talimultiformis measures 4–12 cm across and is hemispherical in young specimens, becoming nearly flat (plano-convex) at maturity. When damp, the surface is viscid and covered in fine, whitish fibres—especially near the margin. Its ground colour ranges from ochre-yellow to red-brown and displays strongly hygrophanous streaks, which pale as the cap dries.

The lamellae are emarginate (notched where they meet the stem), crowded together and pale grey in young mushrooms, turning pale greyish brown with age. The stipe is 4–10 cm long, tapering from 1–2 cm at the apex to 2–3.5 cm at the base, often forming a club shape or a slightly marginate bulb. It is white, and remnants of the universal veil may persist as a sparse white coating on the cap margin. The flesh (context) is white throughout and emits a faint honey-like odour at the base. In dried specimens, the pileus deepens to leather-brown or mahogany, sometimes showing pale variegation at the centre, while the stipe turns pale brownish.

Under the microscope, spores measure 8.4–10.7 by 5.0–6.1 μm (average 8.9–9.9 × 5.3–5.8 μm), are almond-shaped to narrowly spindle-shaped, and bear low wart-like ornamentation. They are slightly to moderately dextrinoid (turning reddish-brown with iodine). The basidia are clavate, four-spored and 27–36 × 7–9 μm in size. The cap cuticle (pileipellis) features a clear, slimy layer over hyphae 1.5–2.5 μm wide, beneath which a hypoderm contains abundant brownish-yellow pigment spots.

== Habitat and distribution ==
Thaxterogaster talimultiformis occurs in mesic hemiboreal to boreal coniferous woodland, favouring stands of Picea and Abies, often on calcareous substrates. It is regarded as common across North and Central Europe and has also been recorded in the mountainous regions of Turkey's eastern Black Sea area. Fruit bodies emerge from June through late August. Documented collections include sites in Finland (Pohjois-Häme, Oulun Pohjanmaa and Perä-Pohjanmaa), France (Haute-Savoie), Germany (Baden-Württemberg), Norway (Oppland) and Turkey (Trabzon).
