= Thaxterogaster caesiophylloides =

Scientific classification
- Domain: Eukaryota
- Kingdom: Fungi
- Division: Basidiomycota
- Class: Agaricomycetes
- Order: Agaricales
- Family: Cortinariaceae
- Genus: Thaxterogaster
- Species: T. caesiophylloides

Binomial name
- Thaxterogaster caesiophylloides (Kytöv., Liimat., Niskanen, Brandrud & Frøslev) Niskanen & Liimat. (2022)

Synonyms
- Cortinarius caesiophylloides Kytöv., Liimat., Niskanen, Brandrud & Frøslev (2014)

Species of mushroom-forming fungus

Thaxterogaster caesiophylloides is a species of mushroom-forming fungus in family Cortinariaceae. It grows on the ground in mesic coniferous forests of Fennoscandia and Slovakia. It was first described scientifically in 2014 as Cortinarius caesiophylloides and later reclassified in 2022. The fungus produces fruiting bodies with sticky caps 4–8 cm across that have apricot to red-brown colours with darker zones. The mushroom is characterized by its pale grey gills with a bluish tint in youth, a whitish stipe with a distinct bulb at the base, and broadly almond-shaped spores.

== Taxonomy ==
The fungus was described as new to science in 2014 and classified as Cortinarius caesiophylloides. The holotype (H6029792) was collected on 30 August 2005 by T. Niskanen and colleagues in a relatively young, mesic to damp Norway spruce (Picea abies) forest with scattered birch (Betula) and Scots pine (Pinus sylvestris) near Koivuranta, west of Lake Rakkolanselkä in Joutsa, South Savo, Finland. It is deposited at the Finnish Museum of Natural History (H), with an isotype (duplicate) preserved at the New York Botanical Garden (NY).

The taxon was placed in the (subgenus Phlegmacium) of the large mushroom-forming fungal genus Cortinarius. The specific epithet caesiophylloides alludes to both its similarity to Cortinarius multiformis var. caesiophyllus (now named C. caesiolamellatus), and the bluish tints in the gills.

In 2022 the species was transferred from Cortinarius and reclassified into the newly circumscribed genus Thaxterogaster, as Thaxterogaster caesiophylloides based on molecular data.

== Description ==
The fruiting body of Thaxterogaster caesiophylloides features a cap (pileus) 4–8 cm across, initially hemispherical and becoming broadly convex. When moist it is viscid and displays apricot to red-brown hues, often with darker hygrophanous streaks or zones—areas that change colour as they dry—ranging from umber to greyish-brown. With age these zones lighten to ochraceous brown or yellow, sometimes appearing almost whitish-ochre at the centre. Beneath the cap are nearly crowded, notched (lamellae) that are pale grey with a bluish tint in youth and mature to pale brown. The stalk (stipe) measures 5–11 cm tall and 1–1.5 cm wide at the apex (expanding to 1.5–3.5 cm at the base), often forming a distinct, marginate bulb. It is whitish or pale grey when young—frequently with a bluish cast at the apex—and turns lightly brown with age. A sparse, white universal veil may persist as a delicate rim at the bulb's margin. The flesh (context) is white, sometimes with a faint bluish tinge near the stipe apex when the fungus is young, and emits a faint honey-like scent at the base.

Microscopically, the spores are broadly almond-shaped (amygdaloid) to almost ellipsoid, measuring on average 9.0–10.2 × 5.5–6.0 μm (range 8.6–10.9 × 5.2–6.3 μm), and bear fine to moderate wart-like ornamentation that often merges into larger bumps. These spores react dextrinoid—that is, they turn reddish-brown in Melzer's reagent—indicating certain wall polysaccharides. The ascus are pleurorhynchous (arising from a hooked basal cell), club-shaped and 270–330 × 13–15 μm, each containing four spores. Sterile supportive filaments (paraphyses) are 3–4 μm wide at the base, brown-walled with granular contents, and expand to 5–8 μm at their clavate tips. In the cap cuticle (pileipellis), an epicutis bears a clear, gelatinous layer studded with sparse, erect-entangled hyphae 2–3 μm wide, while a hypodermal layer beneath contains thin-walled hyphae with pale amber pigment and occasional brown encrustations. The supportive hyphal tissue (trama) in both the lamellae and stipe apex is composed of smooth, pale yellowish hyphae that often contain oil droplets (guttulate).

== Habitat and distribution ==
Thaxterogaster caesiophylloides grows in moderately moist (mesic) coniferous woodland, typically beneath Norway spruce in richer, low-herb understorys. It also occurs in drier pine stands and on calcareous soils, for example on karst outcrops within spruce forest. Fruiting bodies emerge from August into September.

At the time of its original publication, this species was known only from Fennoscandia, where it remains occasional. In Finland it has been recorded in the Kainuu region—at Paltamo's Oikarilankylä old spruce forest and at Kalkkivaara near Pelkosenniemi—and in Norway from a calcareous spruce wood in Nord-Trøndelag's Stjørdal district. It has since been found in Slovakia.
