= Mountain gum =

Mountain gum may refer to:

- Eucalyptus cypellocarpa, also known as the mountain grey gum
- Eucalyptus dalrympleana, also known as the mountain white gum
