= Thaxterogaster melleicarneus =

Scientific classification
- Kingdom: Fungi
- Division: Basidiomycota
- Class: Agaricomycetes
- Order: Agaricales
- Family: Cortinariaceae
- Genus: Thaxterogaster
- Species: T. melleicarneus

Binomial name
- Thaxterogaster melleicarneus (Kytöv., Liimat., Niskanen & Brandrud) Niskanen & Liimat. (2022)

Synonyms
- Cortinarius melleicarneus Kytöv., Liimat., Niskanen & Brandrud (2014)

Species of mushroom-forming fungus

Thaxterogaster melleicarneus is a species of fungus in the family Cortinariaceae, first described in 2014 as a member of the genus Cortinarius before being reclassified in 2022. It is characterized by its medium-sized fruit bodies with cream to honey-brown or grey-brown caps, pale greyish-white gills that turn greyish-brown with age, and distinctively almond-shaped to fusoid spores with densely warted surfaces. This fungus grows in warm-climate deciduous woodlands on calcareous soils, particularly in areas enriched by near-shore sandy shell beds. Known to occur only in Estonia (Hiiumaa) and southern Norway, it appears to prefer humus-rich, shell-influenced terrain beneath mixed stands of oak, beech, and planted larch.

== Taxonomy ==
The fungus was described as new to science in 2014 and classified as Cortinarius melleicarneus. The type specimen of Thaxterogaster melleicarneus was collected on 16 September 2001 by I. Kytövuori (collection no. 01-053) on the island of Hiiumaa in Estonia, within Pühalepa Parish at Soonlepa. It grew in a deciduous forest dominated by Corylus and Quercus on calcareous soil, with scattered Pinus trees. The holotype is deposited at the herbarium of Helsinki University (H), and an isotype (duplicate) is held at the New York Botanical Garden (NY).

Cortinarius melleicarneus was first classified in the subgenus Phlegmacium of the large mushroom genus Cortinarius. The specific epithet melleicarneus refers to the honey coloured cap. In 2022 the species was transferred from Cortinarius into the newly circumscribed Thaxterogaster based on genomic data.

== Description ==
Thaxterogaster melleicarneus produces medium-sized fruit bodies with a cap (pileus) 4–10 cm broad, initially hemispherical to convex with the margin turned inwards and later expanding. The surface may appear silvery-silky from fine veil remnants and ranges in colour from cream through pale yellow-brown or honey brown to grey-brown, often showing darker hygrophanous streaks or zones (areas that deepen in hue as they lose moisture) near the margin. The lamellae are emarginate (notched where they meet the stipe), crowded, pale greyish-white when young and turning pale greyish-brown with age.

The stipe is 5–7 (rarely up to 9) cm long and 1.2–2 cm thick at the apex, widening to 2–3 cm at the base; it is club-shaped (clavate) or bears a faintly marginate bulb, short and robust, and remains white. A very sparse white universal veil may persist at the stipe base. The flesh (context) in the pileus is pale yellow-brown with marbled, flesh-coloured hygrophanous patches, while the stipe context is white. No distinct odour has been recorded.

Microscopically, spores measure 7.9–9.5 by 4.3–5.2 μm (average 8.6–8.9 by 4.7–4.8 μm). Their shape ranges from almond-shaped to fusoid, with a low suprahilar depression and a blunt apex; surfaces are densely to coarsely verrucose (warted) and stain slightly to moderately dextrinoid (reddish-brown) in Melzer's reagent. Basidia are four-spored, clavate, 25–31 by 7–8 μm, often containing granular guttules (oil droplets). The lamellar trama comprises pale yellow, smooth hyphae, while hyphae at the stipe apex are very pale yellowish and smooth without coloured guttules. The pileipellis has a gelatinous epicutis of erect, sinuous hyphae 3–8 μm wide, thin-walled and very finely incrusted, over a hypoderm of pale yellowish-brown cells with few incrusted hyphae and small brown spots deeper in the cap surface.

== Habitat and distribution ==
Thaxterogaster melleicarneus grows in warm‐climate deciduous woodlands on calcareous soils, often where near-shore sandy shell beds enrich the substrate. It is currently known from Hiiumaa in Estonia and from southern Norway. In Norway (Aust-Agder, Grimstad–Fevik), fruit bodies have been found on rich, sandy soils beneath mixed stands of oak, beech and planted larch, suggesting a preference for humus-rich, shell-bed influenced terrain.
