= Thaxterogaster multiformis =

Scientific classification
- Kingdom: Fungi
- Division: Basidiomycota
- Class: Agaricomycetes
- Order: Agaricales
- Family: Cortinariaceae
- Genus: Thaxterogaster
- Species: T. multiformis

Binomial name
- Thaxterogaster multiformis (Fr.) Niskanen & Liimat.

Synonyms
- Cortinarius multiformis Fr.

Species of fungus

Thaxterogaster multiformis
- Mycological characteristics
- Gills on hymenium
- Cap is convex
- Hymenium is adnate or adnexed
- Stipe has a cortina
- Spore print is reddish-brown
- Ecology is mycorrhizal
- Edibility is not recommended

Thaxterogaster multiformis, formerly known as Cortinarius multiformis, is a species of mushroom in the family Cortinariaceae. It is found in Western North America.

== Description ==
The cap of Thaxterogaster multiformis is ochre to brownish and about 3.5-8 centimeters in diameter. It starts out convex or round and becomes broadly convex as the mushroom gets older. It is slimy when wet. The gills start out whitish, before browner as they mature. They can be adnate, adnexed, or notched. The stipe is about 3.8-6.7 centimeters long and 0.9-1.5 centimeters wide at the top. It is bulbous at the base. It is whitish to brownish and fibrillose, and a cortina is present. The spore print is rusty brown.

=== Similar species ===
Several species are similar to Thaxterogaster multiformis, including T. talus and T. talimultiformis. T. talus is similar to T. multiformis, but has pale-colored gills and a cream-colored cap with dark streaks. T. talimultiformis is nearly indistinguishable from T. multiformis, and is best distinguished through DNA analysis.

== Habitat and ecology ==
Thaxterogaster multiformis is found under conifer trees in forests. In the mountains, it more commonly grows under fir, while near the coast, it normally grows under spruce.

== Edibility ==
While Thaxterogaster multiformis is consumed in China and Europe, it is not recommended for consumption, at least in North America. This is because the edibility of the North American variant of this species is unknown, and there are many similar species.
