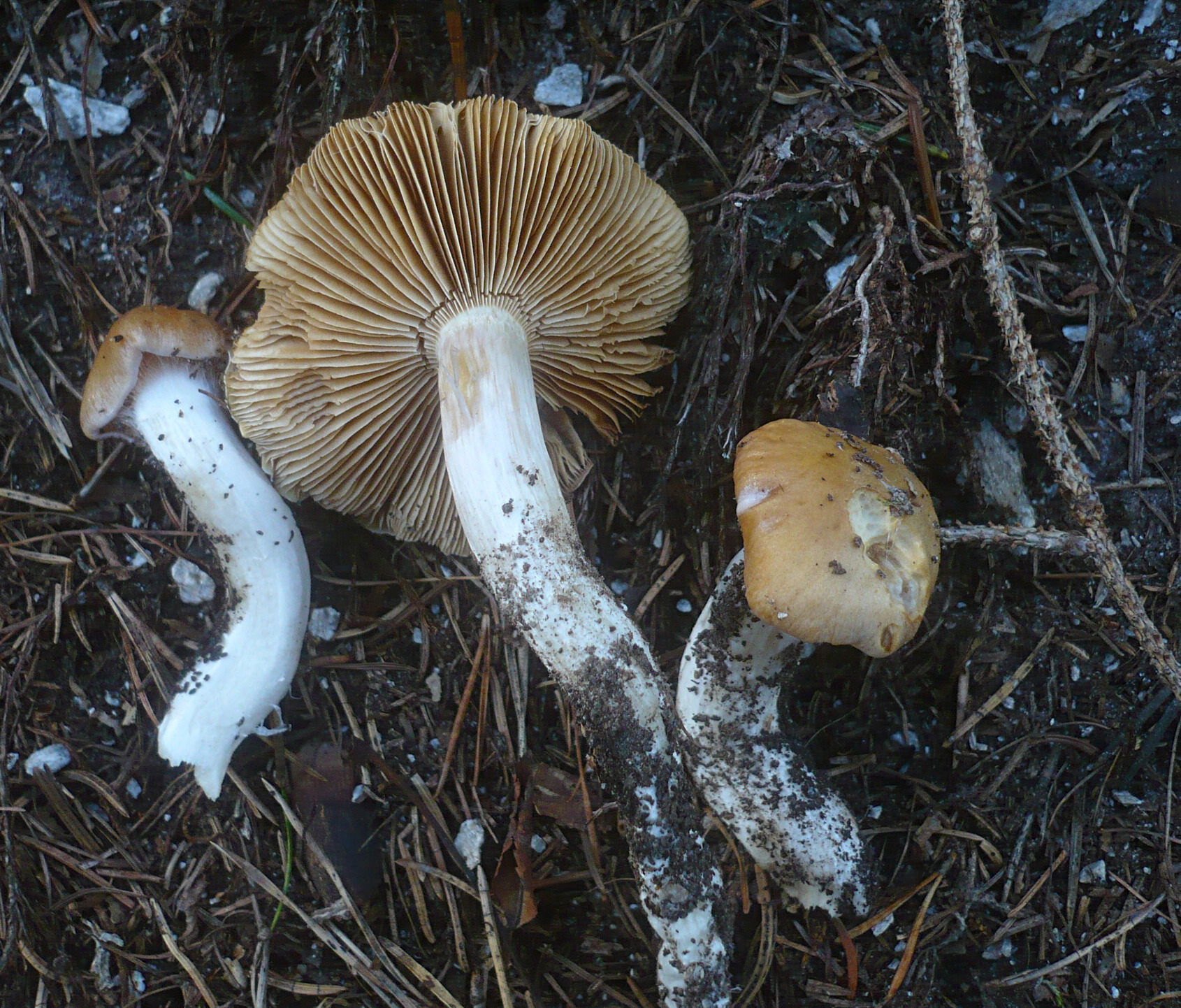

Scientific classification
- Kingdom: Fungi
- Division: Basidiomycota
- Class: Agaricomycetes
- Order: Agaricales
- Family: Cortinariaceae
- Genus: Thaxterogaster
- Species: T. causticus

Binomial name
- Thaxterogaster causticus (Fr.) Niskanen & Liimat.

Synonyms
- Cortinarius causticus Fr.

= Thaxterogaster causticus =

Species of fungus

Thaxterogaster causticus
- Mycological characteristics
- Gills on hymenium
- Cap is conical or umbonate
- Hymenium is adnexed
- Stipe has a cortina
- Spore print is reddish-brown
- Ecology is mycorrhizal
- Edibility is unknown

Thaxterogaster causticus, formerly known as Cortinarius causticus and commonly known as the caustic webcap, is a species of mushroom in the family Cortinariaceae.

== Description ==
The orange, hygrophanous cap of Thaxterogaster causticus is about 1.5-4.5 centimeters in diameter. It starts out conical and usually becomes umbonate in age. The gills start out creamy or white-colored, before becoming brown as the mushroom gets older. They are adnexed and often notched. The stipe is about 3.5-7 centimeters long and 3-6 centimeters wide. It is white and bruises yellow. The spore print is rusty brown. Both the cap and stipe of this mushroom are slimy. There are several similar species, including T. vibratilis, which is found in Europe.

== Habitat and ecology ==
Thaxterogaster causticus grows under conifers, such as pine, hemlock, and fir. It is found in coniferous forests in the Pacific Northwest.
