= Thaxterogaster oregonensis =

Scientific classification
- Kingdom: Fungi
- Division: Basidiomycota
- Class: Agaricomycetes
- Order: Agaricales
- Family: Cortinariaceae
- Genus: Thaxterogaster
- Species: T. oregonensis

Binomial name
- Thaxterogaster oregonensis (A.H. Sm.) Niskanen & Liimat.

Species of fungus

Thaxterogaster oregonensis Mycological characteristics
- Gills on hymenium
- Cap is conical or convex
- Hymenium is adnate
- Stipe has a cortina
- Spore print is reddish-brown
- Ecology is mycorrhizal
- Edibility is unknown

Thaxterogaster oregonensis, also known as Cortinarius oregonensis and commonly known as the egg-yolk webcap, is a species of mushroom in the family Cortinariaceae.

== Description ==
The cap of Thaxterogaster oregonensis starts out light purple with an orangish center. As the mushroom gets older, the center becomes yellower and the rest of the cap becomes less purple. It can be convex, conical, umbonate, or flat. It is about 2-4 centimeters in diameter. The stipe is about 3-9 centimeters long and 4-10 millimeters wide. It can be purplish or grayish. The gills are adnexed and start out purplish, becoming grayish and eventually brown.

== Habitat and ecology ==
Thaxterogaster oregonensis is found in forests. It grows under conifers.
