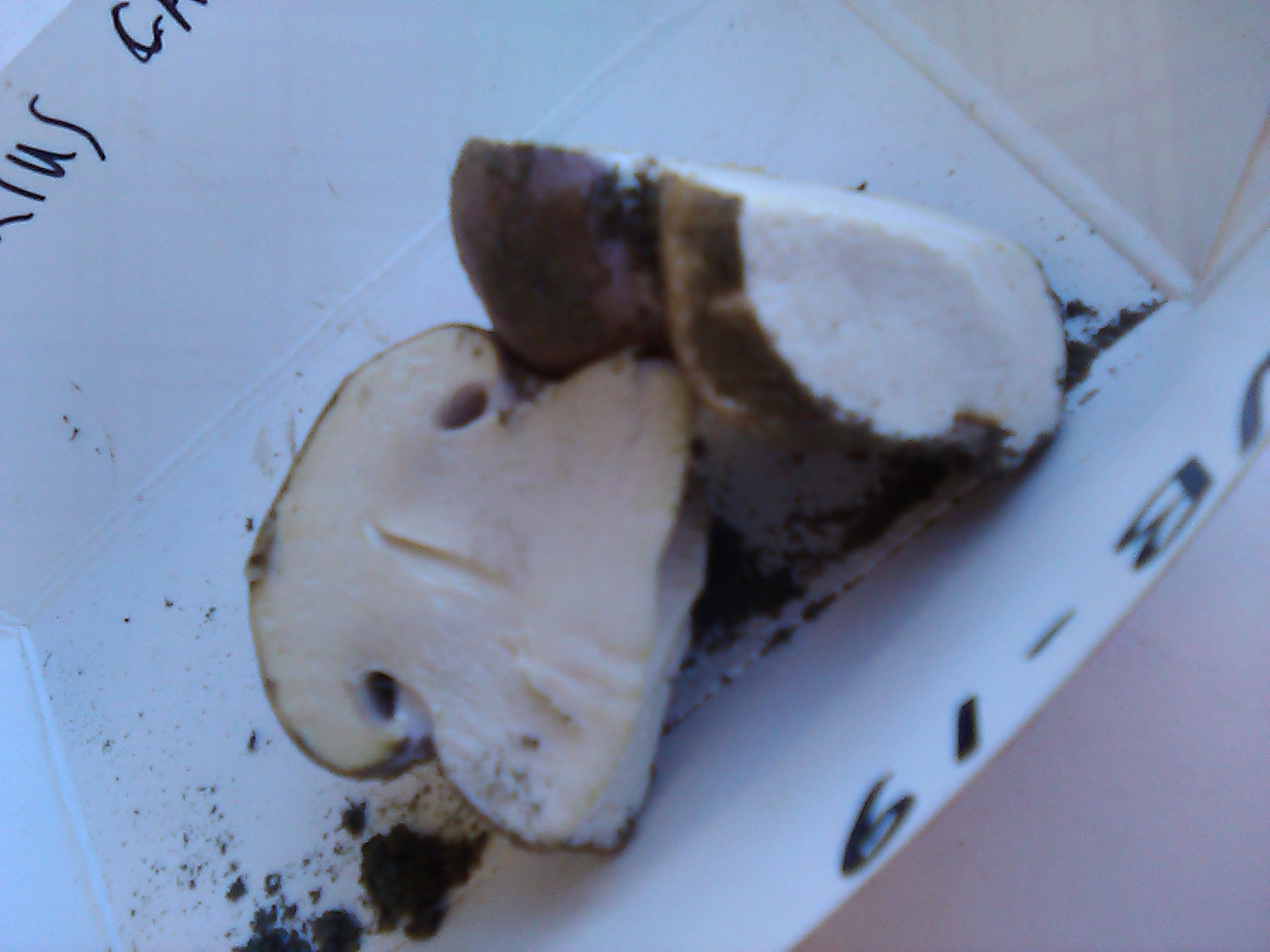
- Thaxterogaster caesiolamellatus mushroom in tray

Scientific classification
- Kingdom: Fungi
- Division: Basidiomycota
- Class: Agaricomycetes
- Order: Agaricales
- Family: Cortinariaceae
- Genus: Thaxterogaster
- Species: T. caesiolamellatus

Binomial name
- Thaxterogaster caesiolamellatus (Bidaud) Niskanen & Liimat. (2022)

Synonyms
- Cortinarius rufoallutus var. caesiolamellatus Bidaud (2006); Cortinarius caesiolamellatus Kytöv., Liimat., Niskanen, Brandrud, Frøslev & A.F.S.Taylor (2014)

= Thaxterogaster caesiolamellatus =

Species of mushroom-forming fungus

Thaxterogaster caesiolamellatus is a species of mushroom-forming fungus in the family Cortinariaceae. The mushroom features a sticky, red-brown to ochraceous cap measuring 4–8 cm (1.6–3.1 in) across, with pale grey to bluish gills that become brown with age, and a whitish stipe that tapers to a small bulb at the base. It grows in montane to mid-boreal coniferous forests, primarily with spruce in Europe and with pine in North America, favouring nutrient-rich or calcareous soils. Though widely distributed across central and northern Europe and extending into the Pacific Northwest of the United States, T. caesiolamellatus is considered occasional rather than common throughout its range.

== Taxonomy ==
It was originally described as new to science in 2006 as a variety of Cortinarius rufoallutus. After molecular and morphological evidence suggested that it was sufficiently unique to be considered a unique species, it was promoted to species status in 2014 and classified as Cortinarius caesiolamellatus. It was placed in the (subgenus Phlegmacium) of the large mushroom genus Cortinarius.

In 2022, the species was transferred from Cortinarius and reclassified into the newly circumscribed genus Thaxterogaster based on genomic data.

== Description ==
The cap (pileus) measures 4–8 cm across and ranges from hemispherical to flattening into a gentle dome. Its surface is sticky when moist and varies in colour from red-brown to ochraceous brown, occasionally with bluish-brown tones. As it ages, the cap often becomes paler ochraceous brown and may appear two-toned, with the outer, hygrophanous region drying to a darker grey-brown. Fine radial wrinkles (rugulose) sometimes develop toward the margin. The gills are notched where they meet the stipe, nearly crowded together, and initially pale grey with a bluish tint before turning pale brown. The stipe is 4–8 cm long and 0.7–1.7 cm thick near the apex, tapering slightly to a small bulb 1.5–2.5 cm wide at the base. It is covered in fine fibres (fibrillose) rather than appearing glossy, and its colour shifts from whitish—or faintly bluish at the top in young specimens—to pale brown with maturity. A sparse, white universal veil may cling to the bulb margin and become somewhat sticky. The flesh (context) is thin beneath the cap cuticle, white with a hint of brown just below the surface, and may show a bluish tint in the stipe when young. A gentle honey scent can be detected at the base of the stipe. In dried herbarium specimens (Latin: specimina exsiccata), the cap usually appears greyish to reddish brown, while the stipe remains very pale.

Microscopically, the spores are ovoid to narrowly egg-shaped, measuring on average about 8.5–10 × 5.2–5.9 μm, based on several collections. Their surface bears moderate to pronounced wart-like spines that often fuse into low ridges and stain reddish-brown in iodine tests (dextrinoid). The spore-bearing cells (basidia) are club-shaped, 25–34 × 7.5–9 μm, and each typically supports four spores. Many basidia and the underlying tissue contain yellowish, grainy or droplet-like contents. The cap cuticle (pileipellis) consists of a gelatinous layer of smooth, colourless hyphae about 2–3 μm wide, arranged in loose, erect tufts. Beneath this is a layer of thin-walled cells with pale brown pigment and occasional small brown spots; conspicuous yellow or brown patches are absent. A few spiral-decorated hyphae occur deeper in the pileipellis.

== Habitat and distribution ==
The mushroom is found in central and northern Europe, where it grows with spruce, and in Washington state (United States), where it additionally grows with pine. The lengthy fruiting season extends from June (in France) to November (in the United States).

== Habitat and distribution ==
Thaxterogaster caesiolamellatus inhabits montane to mid-boreal mesci coniferous forests, favouring nutrient-rich or calcareous soils. In Europe it is almost exclusively found under spruce, often in low-herb or old-growth stands, whereas North American records come from pine woodlands on sandy substrates. Fruiting bodies appear over an extended season, with documented collections as early as June in France and as late as November in Washington state.

Geographically, this species has a scattered but widespread presence across central and northern Europe—including Estonia, Finland, France, Germany, Norway and Sweden—and reaches into the Pacific Northwest of the United States. It is considered occasional throughout its range rather than common, with herbarium specimens reflecting its patchy occurrence beneath conifer canopies.
