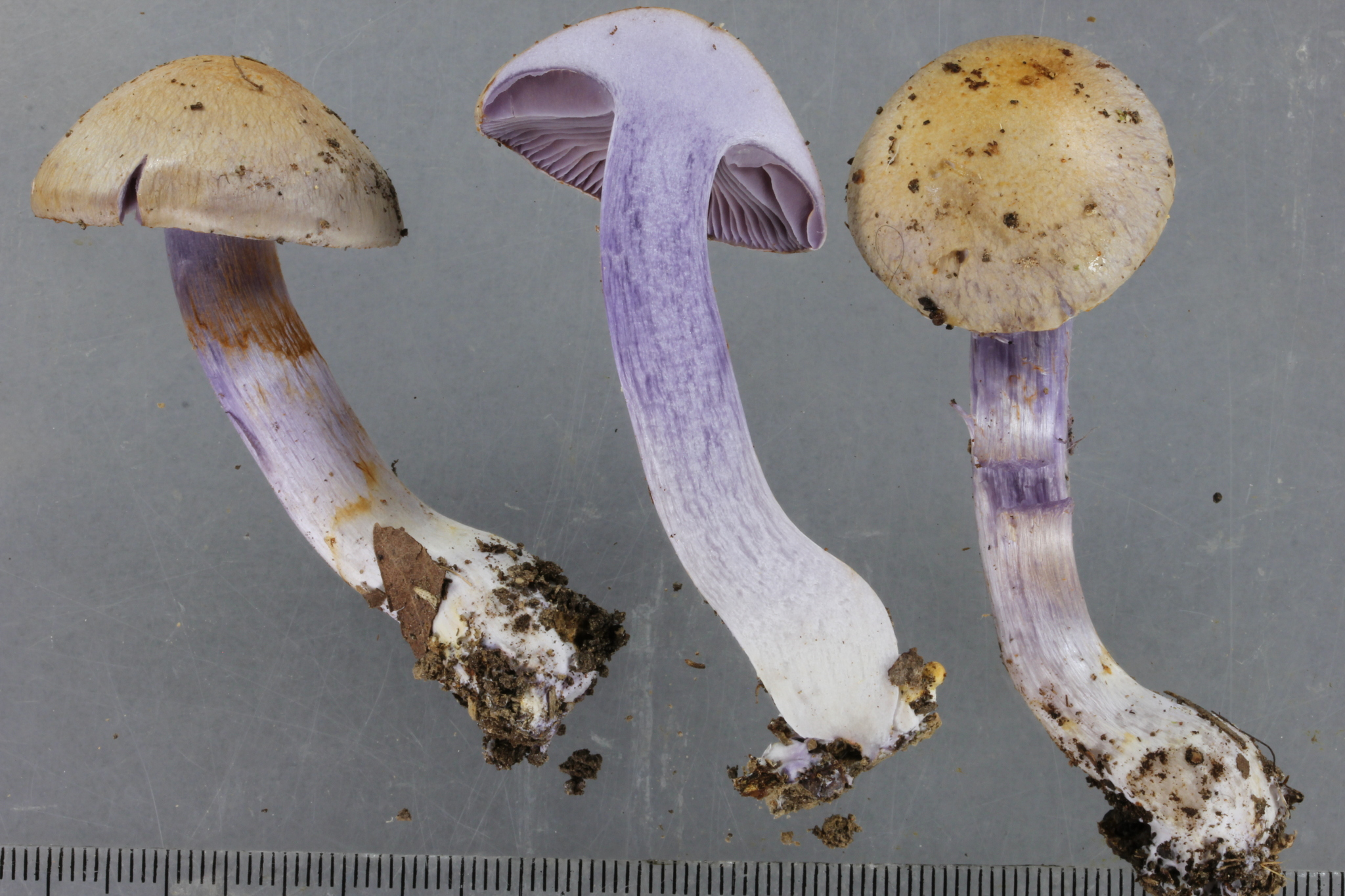

Scientific classification
- Domain: Eukaryota
- Kingdom: Fungi
- Division: Basidiomycota
- Class: Agaricomycetes
- Order: Agaricales
- Family: Cortinariaceae
- Genus: Thaxterogaster
- Species: T. artosoides

Binomial name
- Thaxterogaster artosoides Soop, J.A. Cooper, A.R. Nilsen & Orlovich & N. Siegel

= Thaxterogaster artosoides =

Species of fungi in the genus Thaxterogaster

Thaxterogaster artosoides is a species of fungus that is endemic to Aotearoa New Zealand and it is in the genus Thaxterogaster.

== Description ==
This mushroom cap/pileus of Thaxterogaster artosoides is about 25–65 mm wide and pale orange to greyish yellow with a violet tinge on the margin. The cap has no striation and is also not hygrophanous. In younger fungi of this species the cap has a finely granulate texture, however when they mature the cap becomes sticky. The lamellae are violet in colour with a medium amount of crowding around the stipe. The stipe of the fungus is cylindrical to clavate shaped, dry and white with a coating of pale violet. It can grow to 30–100 mm long and 7–18 mm wide.

The tissue of Thaxterogaster artosoides has no reaction to sodium hydroxide and no significant odour or taste.Thaxterogaster artosoides can be defined from similar looking species such as Phlegmacium artosum and Cortinarius ionomataius, by its wider spores and sticky cap.

== Habitat ==
Thaxterogaster artosoides has been found in Nothofagaceae forests across the south island of Aotearoa. Being an ectomycorrhizal species Thaxterogaster artosoides is associated with certain trees, in this case it is associated with a mix of Nothofagus species.

== Taxonomy ==
This fungus species was described by Soop, J. A. Cooper, A. R. Nilsen, Orlovich and N. Siegel in 2023. The holotype specimen for Thaxerogaster artesoides was collected was collected in a Nothofagaceae forest on 5 May 2011, by Soop.

== Etymology ==
The species name artosoides is derived from the name of the similar looking species Phlegmacium artosum, and the greek word for 'like', ειδες.

== See also ==
- Thaxterogaster
- Fungi of New Zealand
