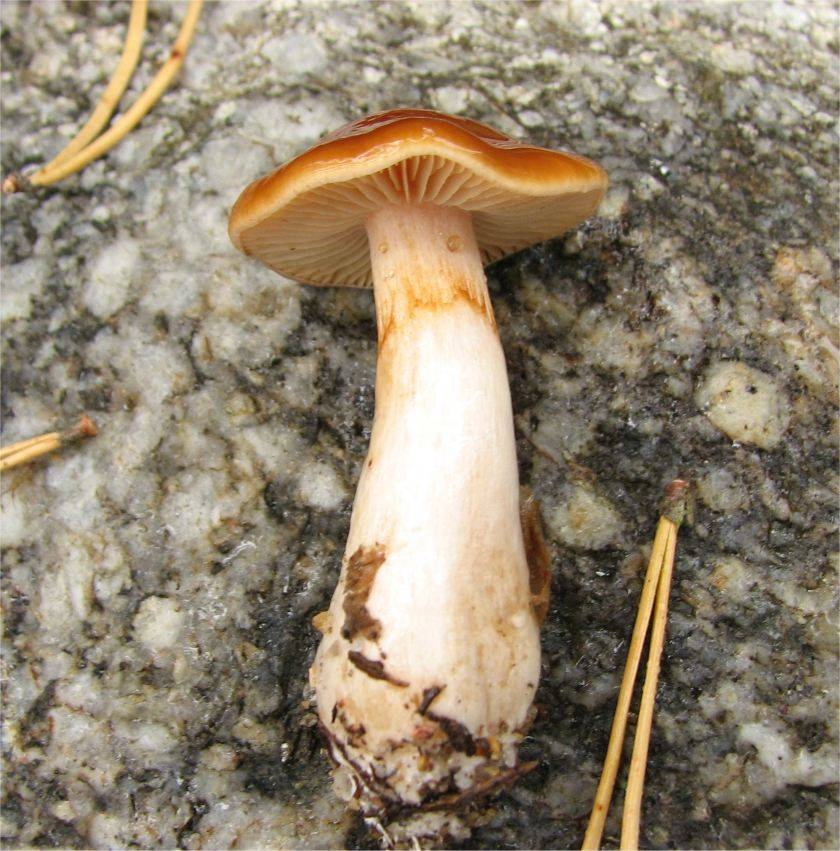

Scientific classification
- Domain: Eukaryota
- Kingdom: Fungi
- Division: Basidiomycota
- Class: Agaricomycetes
- Order: Agaricales
- Family: Cortinariaceae
- Genus: Thaxterogaster
- Species: T. pluvius

Binomial name
- Thaxterogaster pluvius (Fr.) Niskanen & Liimat. (2022)

Synonyms
- Agaricus pluvius Fr. (1821); Cortinarius pluvius (Fr.) Fr. (1838); Myxacium pluvium (Fr.) P.Kumm. (1871); Myxacium pluvium var. gracile Killerm. (1928)

= Thaxterogaster pluvius =

Species of fungus

Thaxterogaster pluvius is a species of fungus in the family Cortinariaceae.

== Taxonomy ==
It was described in 1821 by the Swedish mycologist Elias Magnus Fries who classified it as Agaricus pluvius. In 1838 Fries reclassified it as Cortinarius pluvius.

In 2022 the species was transferred from Cortinarius and reclassified as Thaxterogaster pluvius based on genomic data.

== Habitat and distribution ==
It is found in Europe and North America.

== See also ==
- List of Cortinarius species
