= Thaxterogaster riederi =

Scientific classification
- Kingdom: Fungi
- Division: Basidiomycota
- Class: Agaricomycetes
- Order: Agaricales
- Family: Cortinariaceae
- Genus: Thaxterogaster
- Species: T. riederi

Binomial name
- Thaxterogaster riederi (Weinm.) Niskanen & Liimat.

Synonyms
- Cortinarius riederi (Weinm.) Fr.

Species of fungus

Thaxterogaster riederi
- Mycological characteristics
- Gills on hymenium
- Cap is convex or flat
- Stipe has a cortina
- Spore print is reddish-brown
- Ecology is mycorrhizal
- Edibility is unknown

Thaxterogaster riederi, also known as Cortinarius riederi, is a species of mushroom in the family Cortinariaceae.

== Description ==
The cap of Thaxterogaster riederi is brownish in color and about 4-11 centimeters in diameter. It starts out round, before becoming convex or flat. The gills can be grayish or bluish. The stipe is about 4-11 centimeters long and 0.7-2 centimeters wide at the top. It is bulbous at the base. A cortina is present and the spore print is rusty brown.

== Habitat and ecology ==
Thaxterogaster riederi is found in mountainous forests in the Pacific Northwest. It grows under conifer trees.
