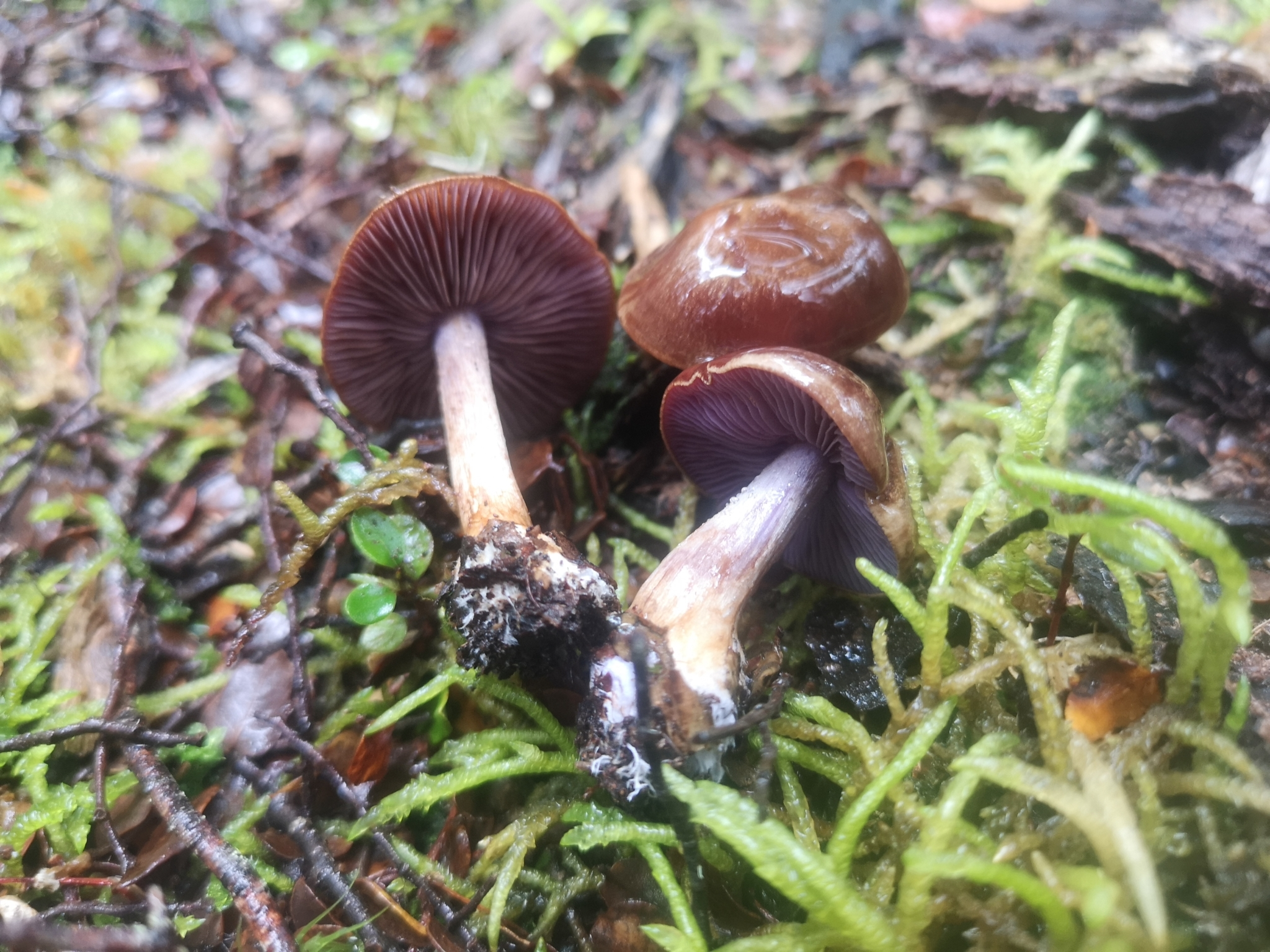
- Thaxterogaster chalybeus

Scientific classification
- Kingdom: Fungi
- Division: Basidiomycota
- Class: Agaricomycetes
- Order: Agaricales
- Family: Cortinariaceae
- Genus: Thaxterogaster; Singer (1951) em. Niskanen & Liimat.

Type species
- Thaxterogaster magellanicus Singer (1951)

= Thaxterogaster =

Genus of fungi

Thaxterogaster is a genus of fungi in the family Cortinariaceae.

== Taxonomy ==
The genus was created in 1951 by the German mycologist Rolf Singer to contain the novel species Thaxterogaster magellanicus and Thaxterogaster violaceum. Several other species were placed in this genus in the subsequent decades but then reclassified as Cortinarius or Descolea species.

In 2022 the family Cortinariaceae, which previously contained only the one genus of Cortinarius was reclassified based on genomic data and split into the genera of Cortinarius, Aureonarius, Austrocortinarius, Calonarius, Cystinarius, Hygronarius, Mystinarius, Phlegmacium, Thaxterogaster and Volvanarius. Numerous Cortinarius species were transferred into the genus of Thaxterogaster as a result of this work.

The genus is further divided with subgenus and section classifications:

- Thaxterogaster subgenus Cretaces includes the section: Cretaces.
- Thaxterogaster subgenus Thaxterogaster includes the sections: Alboaggregati and Thaxterogaster.
- Thaxterogaster subgenus Multiformes includes the sections: Multiformes.
- Thaxterogaster subgenus Riederorum includes the sections: Riederorum.
- Thaxterogaster subgenus Scauri includes the sections: Scauri and Purpurascentes.
- Thaxterogaster subgenus Variegati includes the sections: Variegati.

== Etymology ==
Thaxterogaster is named for the mycologist Roland Thaxter who deposited a specimen at the Farlow Herbarium under the name Secotium magellanicum. This specimen was examined by Singer and used as the basis for his description of Thaxterogaster magellanicum. The genus is named for Thaxter whilst 'gaster' refers to the, now obsolete, class Gasteromycetes since the species is gasteroid in form.

== Species ==
As of January 2023, Species Fungorum accepted 136 species of Thaxterogaster.

1. Thaxterogaster aggregatus (Kauffman) Niskanen & Liimat. (2022)
2. Thaxterogaster alboaggregatus (Soop) Niskanen & Liimat. (2022)
3. Thaxterogaster alboamarescens (Kytöv., Niskanen & Liimat.) Niskanen & Liimat. (2022)
4. Thaxterogaster anomalochrascens (Chevassut & Rob. Henry) Niskanen & Liimat. (2022)
5. Thaxterogaster argenteolilacinus (M.M. Moser) Niskanen & Liimat. (2022)
6. Thaxterogaster argyrionus (Danks, T. Lebel & Vernes) Niskanen & Liimat. (2022)
7. Thaxterogaster armenicorius (Soop & Brandrud) Niskanen & Liimat. (2022)
8. Thaxterogaster artosoides Soop, J.A. Cooper, A.R. Nilsen & Orlovich & N. Siegel (2023)
9. Thaxterogaster aurantionapus (Bidaud & Reumaux) Niskanen & Liimat. (2022)
10. Thaxterogaster australis (Gasparini) Niskanen & Liimat. (2022)
11. Thaxterogaster austrocyanites (Soop) Niskanen & Liimat. (2022)
12. Thaxterogaster austrosaginus (Gasparini) Niskanen & Liimat. (2022)
13. Thaxterogaster austroturmalis (M.M. Moser & E. Horak) Niskanen & Liimat. (2022)
14. Thaxterogaster austrovaginatus (Gasparini) Niskanen & Liimat. (2022)
15. Thaxterogaster barbatus (Batsch) Niskanen & Liimat. (2022)
16. Thaxterogaster burlinghamiae (Bojantchev) Niskanen & Liimat. (2022)
17. Thaxterogaster caesibulga (Vernes, Danks & T. Lebel) Niskanen & Liimat. (2022)
18. Thaxterogaster caesiolamellatus (Bidaud) Niskanen & Liimat. (2022)
19. Thaxterogaster caesiophylloides (Kytöv., Liimat., Niskanen, Brandrud & Frøslev) Niskanen & Liimat. (2022)
20. Thaxterogaster caledoniensis (P.D. Orton) Niskanen & Liimat. (2022)
21. Thaxterogaster castoreus (Soop) Niskanen & Liimat. (2022)
22. Thaxterogaster causticus (Fr.) Niskanen & Liimat. (2022)
23. Thaxterogaster cervinus (M.M. Moser & E. Horak) Niskanen & Liimat. (2022)
24. Thaxterogaster chalybeus (Soop) Niskanen & Liimat. (2022)
25. Thaxterogaster chlorophyllus (Soop) Niskanen & Liimat. (2022)
26. Thaxterogaster cinereoroseolus (Danks, T. Lebel & Vernes) Niskanen & Liimat. (2022)
27. Thaxterogaster collocandoides (Reumaux) Niskanen & Liimat. (2022)
28. Thaxterogaster columbinus (M.M. Moser & E. Horak) Niskanen & Liimat. (2022)
29. Thaxterogaster comarostaphylidis (Ammirati, Halling & Garnica) Niskanen & Liimat. (2022)
30. Thaxterogaster comparoides (Ammirati, Halling & Garnica) Niskanen & Liimat. (2022)
31. Thaxterogaster corrugis (A.H. Sm.) Niskanen & Liimat. (2022)
32. Thaxterogaster cremeolina (Soop) Niskanen & Liimat. (2022)
33. Thaxterogaster cremeorufus (Soop) Niskanen & Liimat. (2022)
34. Thaxterogaster crenulatus (Rob. Henry ex Bidaud & Reumaux) Niskanen & Liimat. (2022)
35. Thaxterogaster cretax (Soop) Niskanen & Liimat. (2022)
36. Thaxterogaster croceocoeruleus (Pers.) Niskanen & Liimat. (2022)
37. Thaxterogaster crypticus (E. Horak) Niskanen & Liimat. (2022)
38. Thaxterogaster dulcamarus (Soop) Niskanen & Liimat. (2022)
39. Thaxterogaster dulciorum (Soop) Niskanen & Liimat. (2022)
40. Thaxterogaster eburneus (Velen.) Niskanen & Liimat. (2022)
41. Thaxterogaster effundens (M.M. Moser, E. Horak & Singer) Niskanen & Liimat. (2022)
42. Thaxterogaster emollitoides (Bidaud, Moënne-Locc. & Reumaux) Niskanen & Liimat. (2022)
43. Thaxterogaster emollitus (Fr.) Niskanen & Liimat. (2022)
44. Thaxterogaster eumarginatus (Rob. Henry ex Bidaud, Carteret & Reumaux) Niskanen & Liimat. (2022)
45. Thaxterogaster fiordlandensis (Soop) Niskanen & Liimat. (2022)
46. Thaxterogaster frondosomultiformis (Bellù, Brandrud & Dima) Niskanen & Liimat. (2022)
47. Thaxterogaster fuligineofolius (M.M. Moser) Niskanen & Liimat. (2022)
48. Thaxterogaster fulvo-ochrascens ochrascens (Rob. Henry) Niskanen & Liimat. (2022)
49. Thaxterogaster galeobdolon (Melot) Niskanen & Liimat. (2022)
50. Thaxterogaster genuinus (Bidaud & Carteret) Niskanen & Liimat. (2022)
51. Thaxterogaster glacialis (Bidaud & Reumaux) Niskanen & Liimat. (2022)
52. Thaxterogaster glaucocyanopus (Rob. Henry) Niskanen & Liimat. (2022)
53. Thaxterogaster herpeticus (Fr.) Niskanen & Liimat. (2022)
54. Thaxterogaster imbricatoides (Rob. Henry) Niskanen & Liimat. (2022)
55. Thaxterogaster iringa (Soop) Niskanen & Liimat. (2022)
56. Thaxterogaster ixomolynus (Soop) Niskanen & Liimat. (2022)
57. Thaxterogaster kaimanawa (Soop) Niskanen & Liimat. (2022)
58. Thaxterogaster laquellus (Soop) Niskanen & Liimat. (2022)
59. Thaxterogaster largoides (Rob. Henry ex Bidaud, Carteret & Reumaux) Niskanen & Liimat. (2022)
60. Thaxterogaster leucoluteolus (Rob. Henry) Niskanen & Liimat. (2022)
61. Thaxterogaster leucophanes (P. Karst.) Niskanen & Liimat. (2022)
62. Thaxterogaster lilaceolamellatus (Lebeuf, A. Paul, J. Landry & Y. Lamoureux) Niskanen & Liimat. (2022)
63. Thaxterogaster lustratus (Fr.) Niskanen & Liimat. (2022)
64. Thaxterogaster luteofuscus (Peck) Niskanen & Liimat. (2022)
65. Thaxterogaster magellanicus Singer (1951)
66. Thaxterogaster magicus (Eichhorn) Niskanen & Liimat. (2022)
67. Thaxterogaster malachioides (P.D. Orton) Niskanen & Liimat. (2022)
68. Thaxterogaster malvaceus (E. Horak) Niskanen & Liimat. (2022)
69. Thaxterogaster mariae (E. Horak) Niskanen & Liimat. (2022)
70. Thaxterogaster medioscaurus (Soop) Niskanen & Liimat. (2022)
71. Thaxterogaster melleicarneus (Kytöv., Liimat., Niskanen & Brandrud) Niskanen & Liimat. (2022)
72. Thaxterogaster mendax (Bidaud, Mahiques & Reumaux) Niskanen & Liimat. (2022)
73. Thaxterogaster microspermus (J.E. Lange) Niskanen & Liimat. (2022)
74. Thaxterogaster monaensis Liimat., Danhao Wang & Niskanen (2022)
75. Thaxterogaster montanus (Kauffman) Niskanen & Liimat. (2022)
76. Thaxterogaster multiformis (Fr.) Niskanen & Liimat. (2022)
77. Thaxterogaster mutabilis (A.H. Sm.) Niskanen & Liimat. (2022)
78. Thaxterogaster myxenosma (Soop) Niskanen & Liimat. (2022)
79. Thaxterogaster myxoclaricolor (M.M. Moser) Niskanen & Liimat. (2022)
80. Thaxterogaster nebulobrunneus (Danks, T. Lebel & Vernes) Niskanen & Liimat. (2022)
81. Thaxterogaster occidentalis (A.H. Sm.) Niskanen & Liimat. (2022)
82. Thaxterogaster ochroamarus (Niskanen, Kytöv. & Liimat.) Niskanen & Liimat. (2022)
83. Thaxterogaster ochroleucus (Schaeff.) Niskanen & Liimat. (2022)
84. Thaxterogaster ochropudorinus (Rob. Henry ex Bidaud & Reumaux) Niskanen & Liimat. (2022)
85. Thaxterogaster olivaceus (Peck) Niskanen & Liimat. (2022)
86. Thaxterogaster olorinatus (E. Horak) Niskanen & Liimat. (2022)
87. Thaxterogaster oregonensis (A.H. Sm.) Niskanen & Liimat. (2022)
88. Thaxterogaster ovreboi (Ammirati, Halling & Garnica) Niskanen & Liimat. (2022)
89. Thaxterogaster pallidirimosus (Kytöv., Liimat. & Niskanen) Niskanen & Liimat. (2022)
90. Thaxterogaster pallidoriederi (Brandrud, Dima & Bellù) Niskanen & Liimat. (2022)
91. Thaxterogaster parapluvius (Bidaud & Reumaux) Niskanen & Liimat. (2022)
92. Thaxterogaster parksianus (A.H. Sm.) Niskanen & Liimat. (2022)
93. Thaxterogaster parolivascens (Moënne-Locc. & Reumaux) Niskanen & Liimat. (2022)
94. Thaxterogaster periclymenus (Soop) Niskanen & Liimat. (2022)
95. Thaxterogaster peristeris (Soop) Niskanen & Liimat. (2022)
96. Thaxterogaster permagnificus (E. Horak) Niskanen & Liimat. (2022)
97. Thaxterogaster persicanus (Soop) Niskanen & Liimat. (2022)
98. Thaxterogaster picoides (Soop) Niskanen & Liimat. (2022)
99. Thaxterogaster pinophilus (Soop) Niskanen & Liimat. (2022)
100. Thaxterogaster pluvialis (Kühner) Niskanen & Liimat. (2022)
101. Thaxterogaster pluvius (Fr.) Niskanen & Liimat. (2022)
102. Thaxterogaster porphyropus (Alb. & Schwein.) Niskanen & Liimat. (2022)
103. Thaxterogaster pseudoarquatus (A.H. Sm.) Niskanen & Liimat. (2022)
104. Thaxterogaster pseudominor (Rob. Henry ex Reumaux) Niskanen & Liimat. (2022)
105. Thaxterogaster pseudotalus (Rob. Henry ex Bidaud & Reumaux) Niskanen & Liimat. (2022)
106. Thaxterogaster pseudotriumphans (M.M. Moser & E. Horak) Niskanen & Liimat. (2022)
107. Thaxterogaster psilomorphus (Soop) Niskanen & Liimat. (2022)
108. Thaxterogaster pugionipes (M.M. Moser) Niskanen & Liimat. (2022)
109. Thaxterogaster purpurascens (Fr.) Niskanen & Liimat. (2022)
110. Thaxterogaster reginae Niskanen, Liimat., Kytöv. & Danhao Wang (2022)
111. Thaxterogaster rhipiduranus (Soop) Niskanen & Liimat. (2022)
112. Thaxterogaster rhodophyllus (M.M. Moser & E. Horak) Niskanen & Liimat. (2022)
113. Thaxterogaster riederi (Weinm.) Niskanen & Liimat. (2022)
114. Thaxterogaster rufoallutus (Rob. Henry ex Bidaud & Reumaux) Niskanen & Liimat. (2022)
115. Thaxterogaster scaurus (Fr.) Niskanen & Liimat. (2022)
116. Thaxterogaster singularis (Soop) Niskanen & Liimat. (2022)
117. Thaxterogaster sphagnophilus (Peck) Niskanen & Liimat. (2022)
118. Thaxterogaster stilazureus (Rob. Henry) Niskanen & Liimat. (2022)
119. Thaxterogaster subinops (Reumaux) Niskanen & Liimat. (2022)
120. Thaxterogaster submagellanicus (Gasparini) Niskanen & Liimat. (2022)
121. Thaxterogaster subporphyropus (Pilát) Niskanen & Liimat. (2022)
122. Thaxterogaster subpurpurascens (Batsch) Niskanen & Liimat. (2022)
123. Thaxterogaster subsebaceus (Bidaud, Carteret & Reumaux) Niskanen & Liimat. (2022)
124. Thaxterogaster talimultiformis (Kytöv., Liimat., Niskanen, A.F.S. Taylor & Seslı) Niskanen & Liimat. (2022)
125. Thaxterogaster talus (Fr.) Niskanen & Liimat. (2022)
126. Thaxterogaster thalliopurpurascens (Rob. Henry) Niskanen & Liimat. (2022)
127. Thaxterogaster turcopes (Soop) Niskanen & Liimat. (2022)
128. Thaxterogaster turmalis (Fr.) Niskanen & Liimat. (2022)
129. Thaxterogaster ultimus Liimat., Danhao Wang, D. Savage & Niskanen (2022)
130. Thaxterogaster urbiculus (Soop) Niskanen & Liimat. (2022)
131. Thaxterogaster variegatus (Bres.) Niskanen & Liimat. (2022)
132. Thaxterogaster verniciorum (Soop) Niskanen & Liimat. (2022)
133. Thaxterogaster vespertinus (Fr.) Niskanen & Liimat. (2022)
134. Thaxterogaster vibratilis (Fr.) Niskanen & Liimat. (2022)
135. Thaxterogaster violaceonitens (Rob. Henry) Niskanen & Liimat. (2022)
136. Thaxterogaster virentophyllus (Kauffman) Niskanen & Liimat. (2022)
137. Thaxterogaster xiphidipus (M.M. Moser & E. Horak) Niskanen & Liimat. (2022)

== Morphological Description ==
Characterized by agaricoid or sequestrate, small-large sized basidiomata. Pileus at first hemispherical, convex to plano-convex with age, smooth, fibrillose or scaly, dry to viscid to glutinous, hygrophanous to non-hygrophanous; white, yellow, pale to dark brown with gray, ochraceous or red tints (some species displaying olivaceous hues).

Section Unfinished
