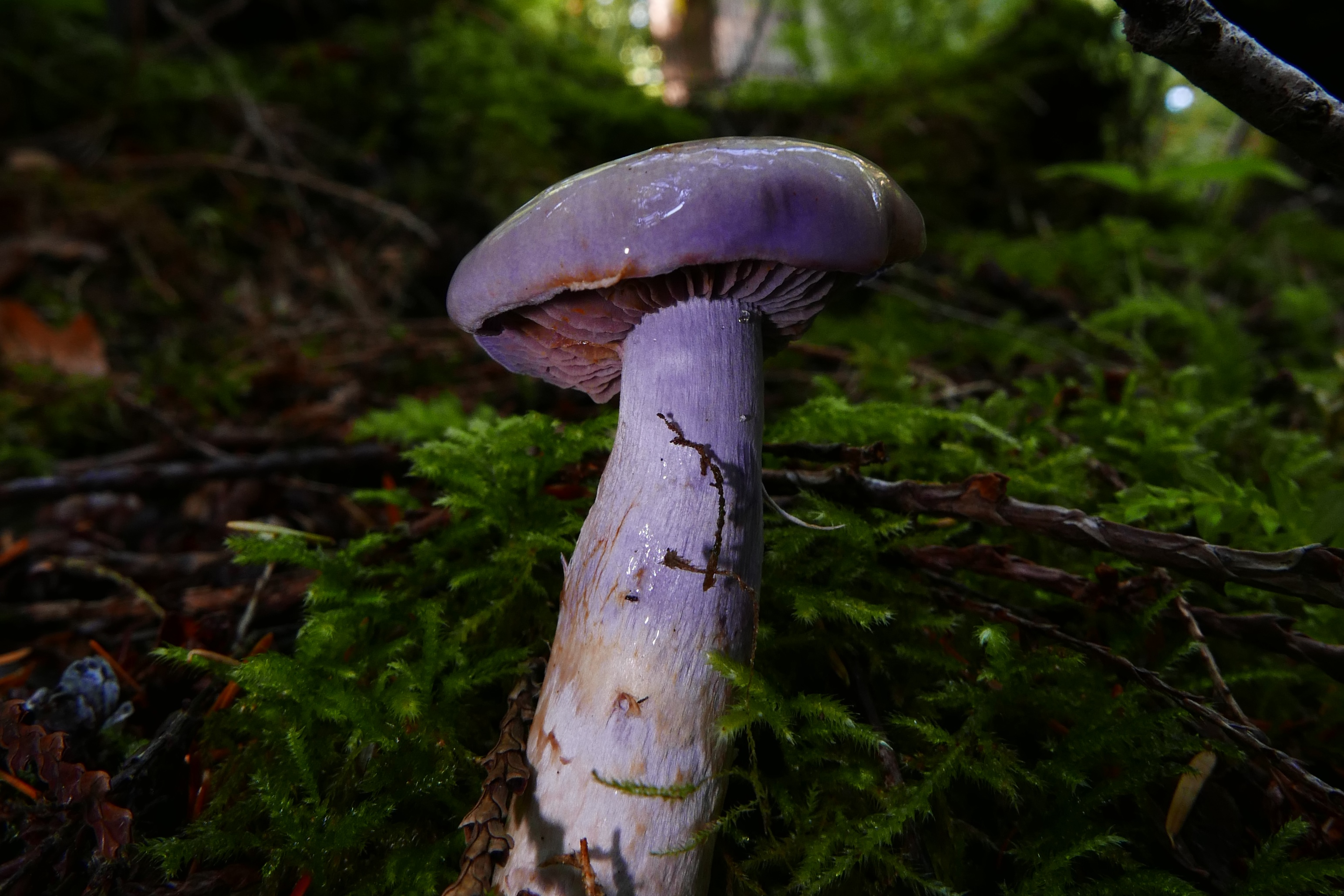
- In Little Skookum, Mason Co., Washington, US, under mature western red cedar and vine maple

Scientific classification
- Kingdom: Fungi
- Division: Basidiomycota
- Class: Agaricomycetes
- Order: Agaricales
- Family: Cortinariaceae
- Genus: Thaxterogaster
- Species: T. occidentalis

Binomial name
- Thaxterogaster occidentalis A.H.Sm. Niskanen & Liimat. (2022)

Synonyms
- Cortinarius occidentalis A.H. Sm. (1939); Cortinarius purpurascens var. obscurus M.M. Moser (1953); Phlegmacium occidentale (A.H.Sm.) M.M. Moser (1953)

= Thaxterogaster occidentalis =

Species of fungus

Thaxterogaster occidentalis, commonly known as the western purple-staining webcap, The gills are adnexed to notched. is a species of fungus in the family Cortinariaceae.

== Taxonomy ==
It was described in 1939 by the American mycologist Alexander H. Smith who classified it as Cortinarius occidentalis.

In 2022 the species was transferred from Cortinarius and reclassified as Thaxterogaster occidentalis based on genomic data.

== Description ==
The cap of Thaxterogaster occidentalis is about 3-5.6 centimeters in diameter and purple in color. It is slimy, and starts out round or convex. It expands in age. The gills are purplish in color and adnate. The stipe is about 3.2-5.5 centimeters long and 0.9-1.1 centimeters wide at the top. It is wider at the base. A cortina is present, and the spore print is rusty brown. The inside of the mushroom is purple and stains darker purple.

== Habitat and distribution ==
Thaxterogaster occidentalis
- Mycological characteristics
- Gills on hymenium
- Cap is convex
- Hymenium is adnate
- Stipe has a cortina
- Spore print is reddish-brown
- Ecology is mycorrhizal
- Edibility is unknown

Thaxterogaster occidentalis is native to the Northern Hemisphere.
