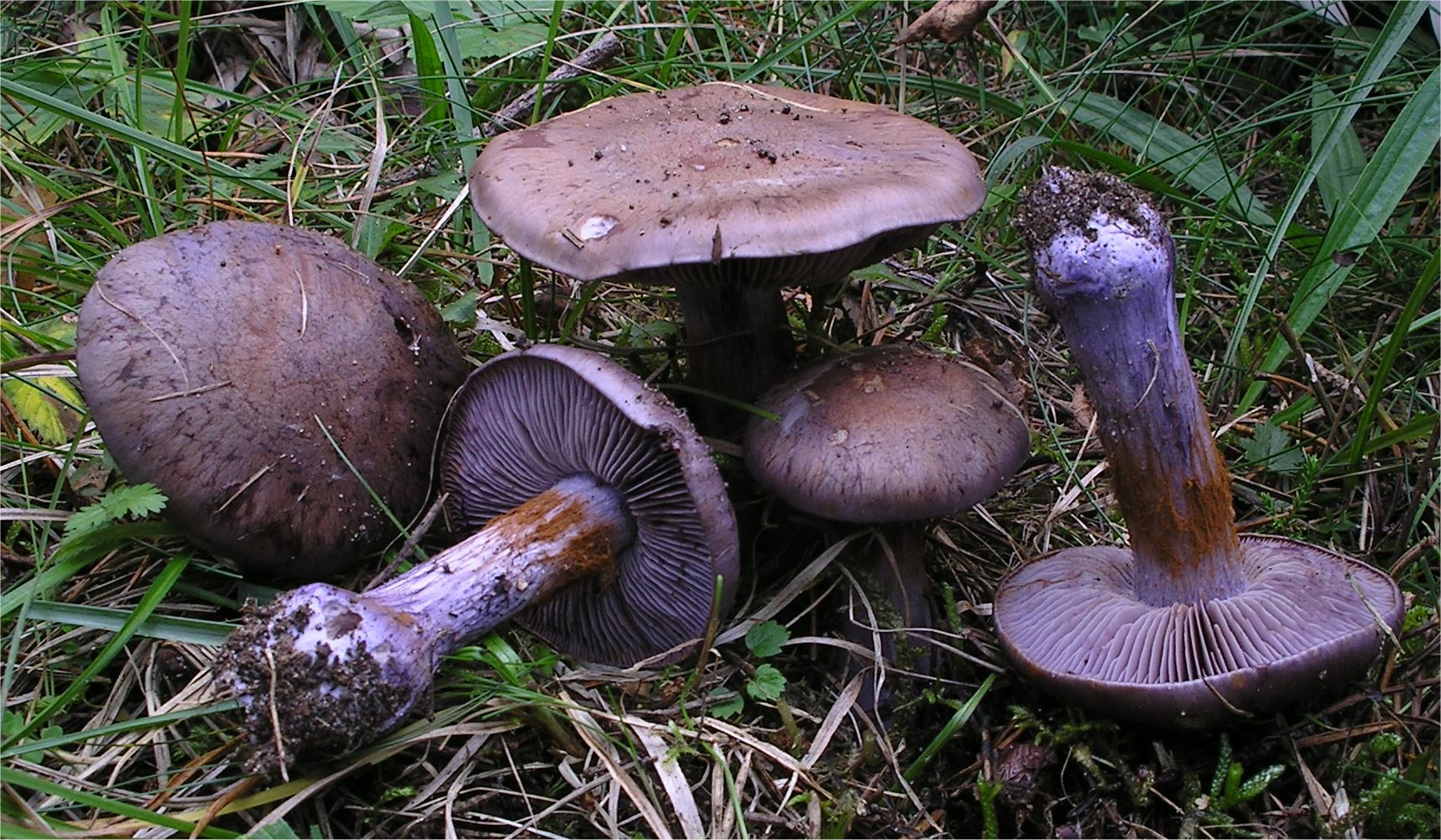

Scientific classification
- Kingdom: Fungi
- Division: Basidiomycota
- Class: Agaricomycetes
- Order: Agaricales
- Family: Cortinariaceae
- Genus: Thaxterogaster
- Species: T. purpurascens

Binomial name
- Thaxterogaster purpurascens (Fr.) Niskanen & Liimat. (2022)

Synonyms
- Agaricus purpurascens Fr. (1818); Cortinarius purpurascens Fr. (1838); Cortinarius purpurascens var. largusoides Cetto (1991); Phlegmacium purpurascens Ricken (1915)

= Thaxterogaster purpurascens =

Species of fungus

Thaxterogaster purpurascens
- Mycological characteristics
- Gills on hymenium
- Cap is convex
- Hymenium is emarginate
- Stipe is bare
- Spore print is brown
- Ecology is mycorrhizal
- Edibility is edible

Thaxterogaster purpurascens is a species of mushroom producing fungus in the family Cortinariaceae. It is commonly known as the bruising webcap.

== Taxonomy ==
The species was first described as Agaricus purpurascens by Elias Magnus Fries in 1818. In 1838 Fries reclassified it as Cortinarius pluvius.

The species was also placed in the segregate genus Phlegmacium by Aldabert Ricken as P. purpurascens.

In 2022 the species was transferred from Cortinarius and reclassified as Thaxterogaster purpurascens based on genomic data. This study also reclassified three of the variants of this species and transferred them to the distinct species: Thaxterogaster eumarginatus, Thaxterogaster occidentalis and Thaxterogaster subpurpurascens.

== Description ==
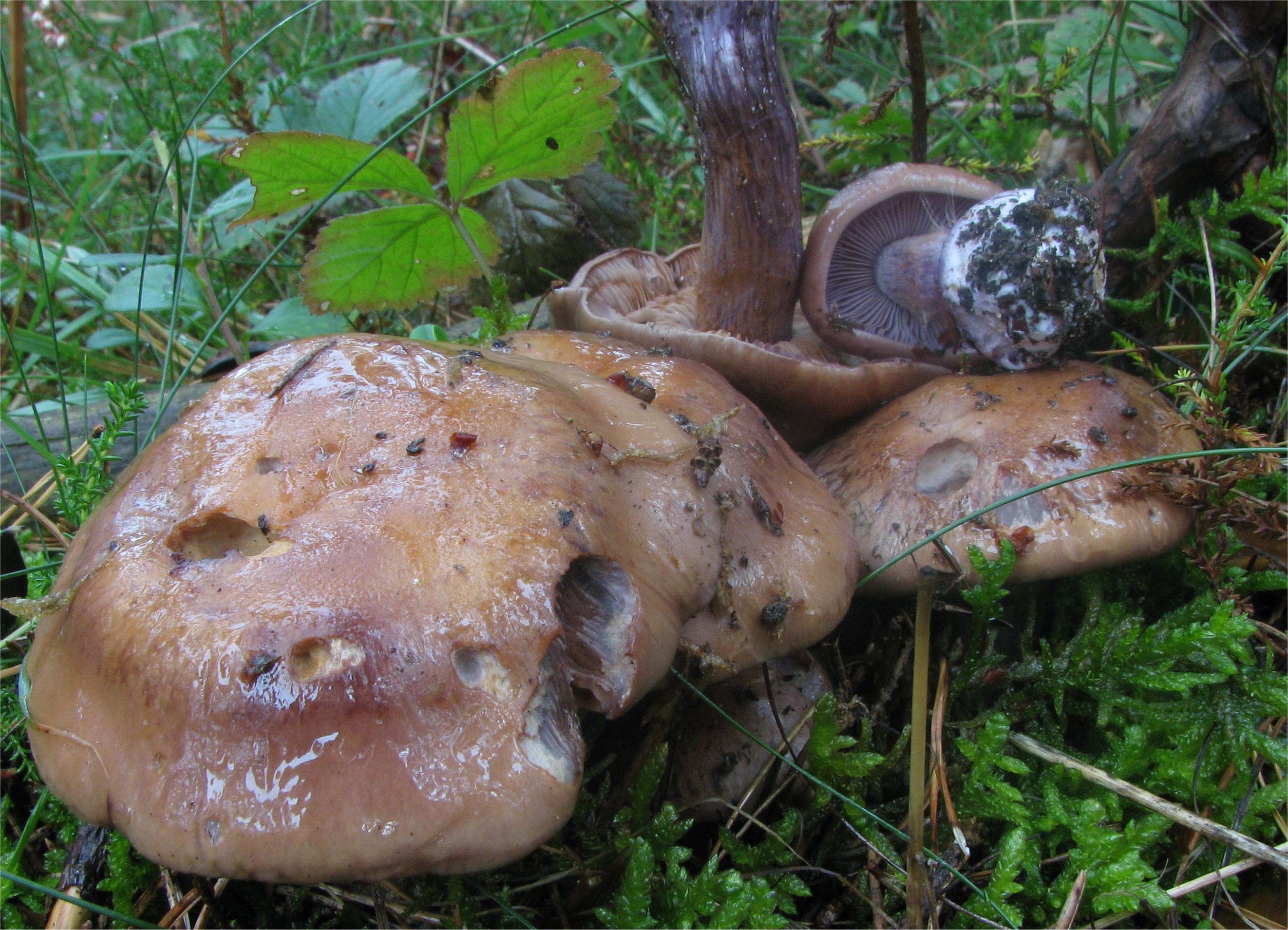
The sticky caps may range in color from brownish to grayish blue.

The cap is 3–10 cm (1.2–3.9 in) in diameter, initially convex before flattening out somewhat. The margin is rolled inward, and viscid, cuticle which is often slightly spotted, smooth and with small fugacious viscid concolorous flocci. The color varies from dirty brownish or brownish-rust to ocher or grayish bluish in the center. The margin is fibrillose (covered with roughly parallel threadlike filaments), then smooth, with a violet or reddish-violet to grayish-brown tinge, then concolorous with the center of the cap. The gills are thin and crowded closely together, broadly emarginate (notched), dark violet when young, with edges often slightly denticulate (finely toothed). The tinge and intensity of the violet coloring is similar to that of the wood blewitt (Collybia nuda). The stem is solid, vivid violet paling to violet purple or violet brown, with a distinctly marginate bulb 3–4 cm (1.2–1.6 in) wide, otherwise almost cylindrical towards the base. The cortina (a cobweb-like partial veil consisting of silky fibrils) is violet. The flesh is violet lilac or violet, paling slightly when mature, and with a weak, unpleasant smell and mild taste. When cut or broken it turns purple, like the gills. It is an edible mushroom of medium quality.

The spores are ellipsoid, slightly almond-shaped, verrucose, and measure 9–10 by 4.8–6 μm. The basidia (the spore-bearing cells) are 30–35 by 7–9 μm. On the edge of the gills there are thin-walled irregularly bottle-shaped cheilocystidia, which protrude 20–30 μm. The spore deposit is brownish rust to light brown.

== Distribution and habitat ==
The fruit bodies of Thaxterogaster purpurascens grow in groups in coniferous forests, mainly on more acid soils and are quite rare. It is distributed throughout the temperate zone of the Northern Hemisphere, and has been collected from Europe and North America.

== See also ==
- List of Cortinarius species
