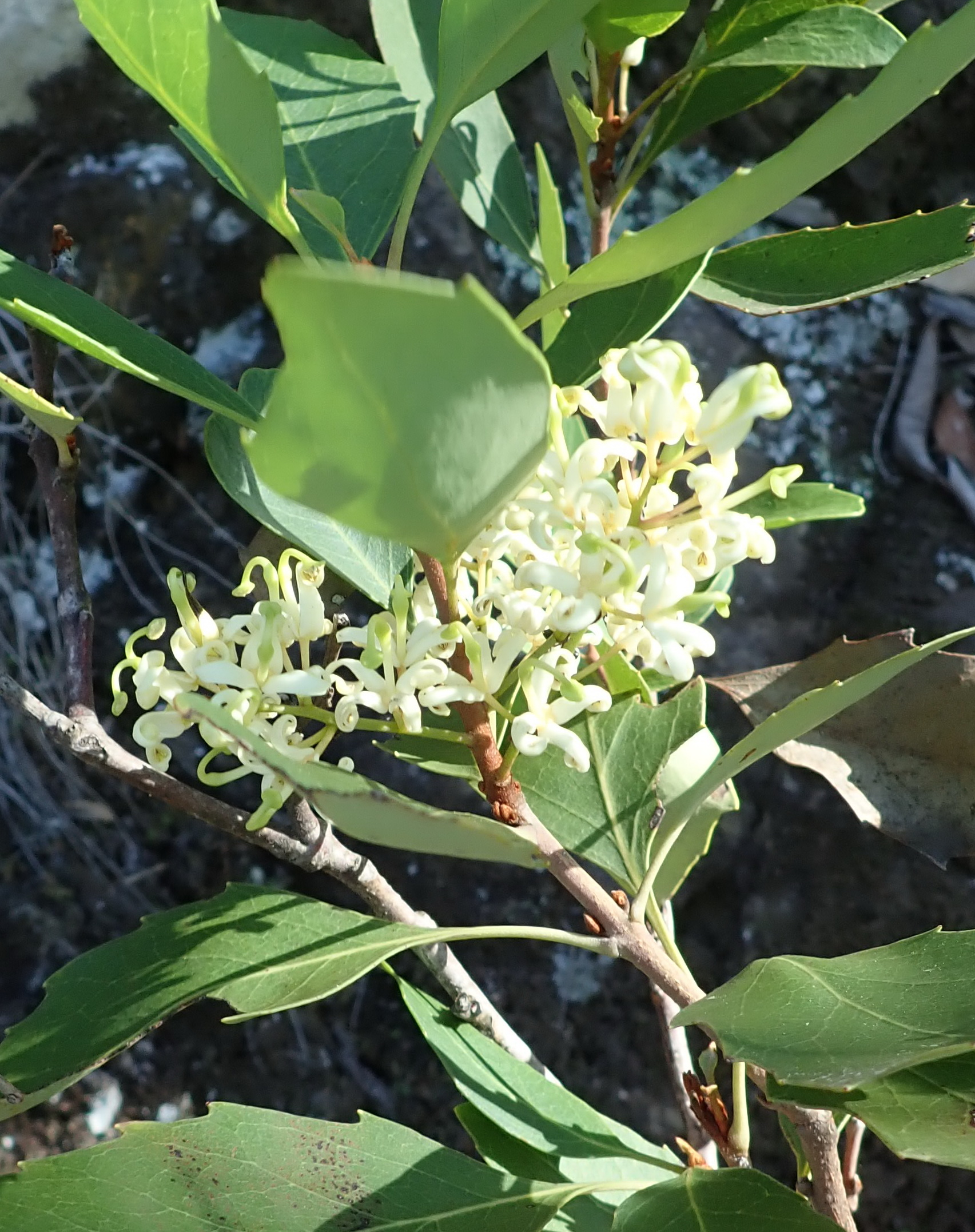
- Lomatia arborescens in Mount Kaputar National Park

Scientific classification
- Kingdom: Plantae
- Clade: Embryophytes
- Clade: Tracheophytes
- Clade: Spermatophytes
- Clade: Angiosperms
- Clade: Eudicots
- Order: Proteales
- Family: Proteaceae
- Genus: Lomatia
- Species: L. arborescens

Binomial name
- Lomatia arborescens L.R.Fraser & Vickery
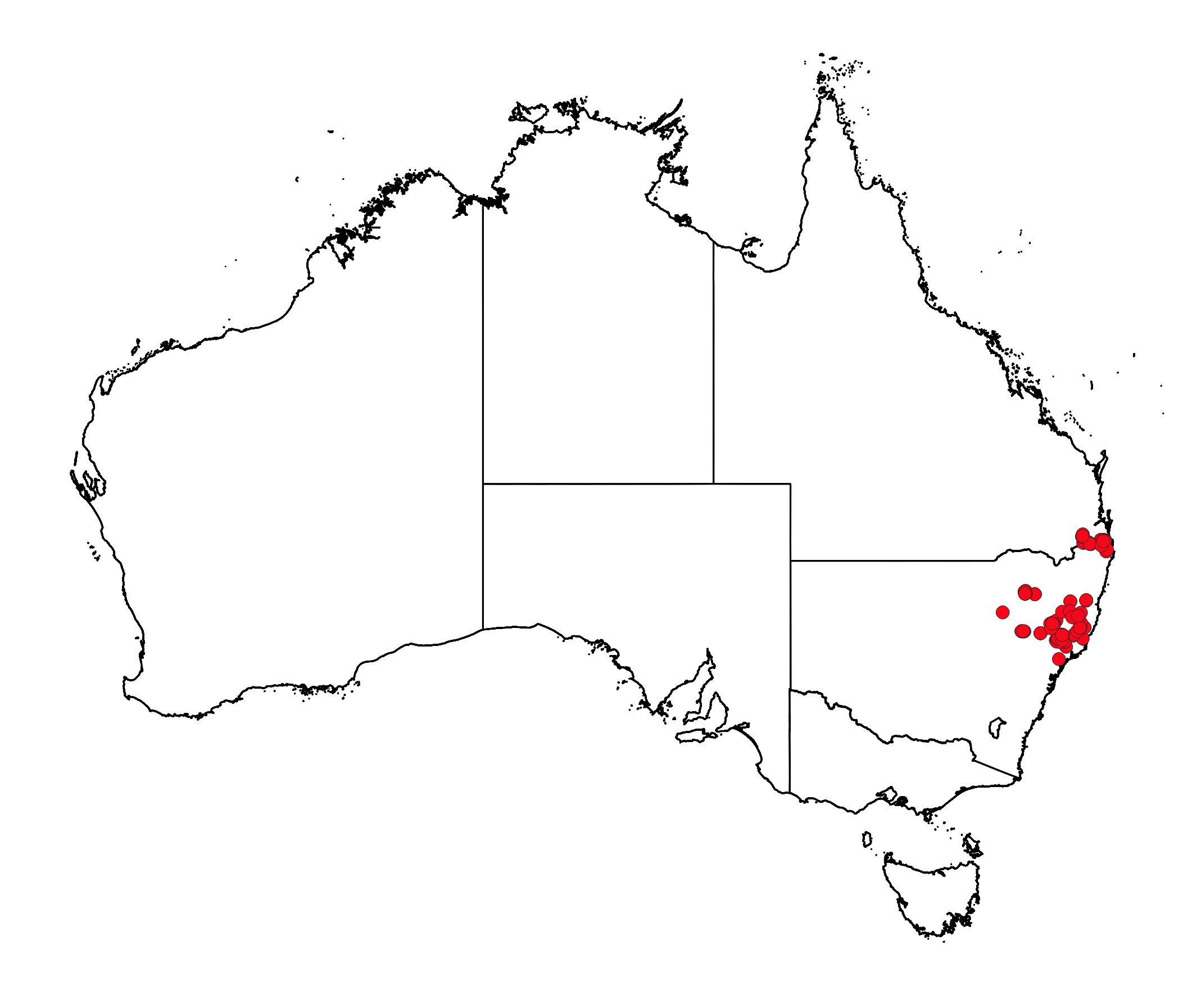
- Occurrence data from AVH with cultivated specimens removed

Synonyms
- Lomatia ilicifolia auct. non R.Br.Benth.

= Lomatia arborescens =

Smooth lomatia

Species of plant native to eastern Australia

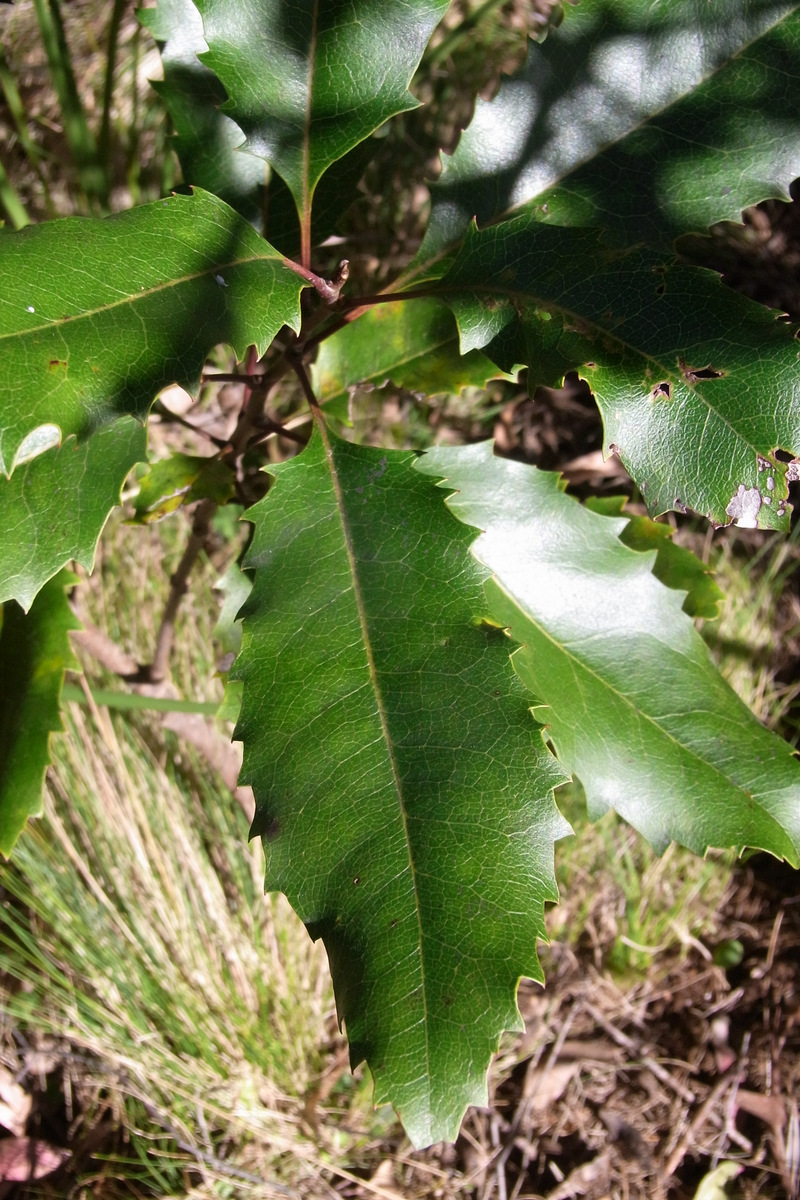
In Barrington Tops National Park

Lomatia arborescens, commonly known as smooth lomatia or tree lomatia, is a shrub or small tree that grows at high altitudes, in and near rainforests. It is found north from the Barrington Tops area in eastern Australia.

== Description ==
Lomatia arborescens grows as a large shrub or small tree to 10 m (35 ft) high, with greyish brown bark. The smooth leaves are oval to spear-shaped (lanceolate) and measure 3 to 15 cm (1.2–6 in) in length by 1.5 to 6 cm (0.6–2.2 in) wide—generally larger and with serrated leaf margins in sheltered spots and smaller with entire margins in exposed locations. A network of veins can be seen on the upper surface of the leaves.

The white flowers grow in racemes that arise from axillary buds, appearing over the summer.

== Taxonomy ==
Lomatia arborescens was first formally described in 1937 by Lilian Fraser and Joyce Winifred Vickery, from a specimen collected by them on 12 January 1934 in rainforest along the Williams River. The species name is derived from the Latin arbor, "tree", hence, "tree-like".

George Bentham had described Lomatia longifolia var. arborescens as a variety of Lomatia longifolia (now Lomatia myricoides) in his 1870 work Flora Australiensis, describing it as a "small tree of 20 to 25 ft" from the "Sydney woods". The identity of this form is unclear, with Alexander Floyd stating it was L. arborescens and the authors of Flora of Australia identifying it as L. myricoides.

It was mistakenly called L. ilicifolia by Queensland botanist Frederick Manson Bailey in his 1901 work Queensland Flora.

Analysis of chloroplast DNA showed that there is extensive hybridization between the five species (L. arborescens, L. fraseri, L. ilicifolia, L. myricoides and L. silaifolia) of mainland southeastern Australia, though each is distinct enough to warrant species status.

== Distribution and habitat ==
Lomatia arborescens is found from southern Queensland southwest to Mount Kaputar National Park and south to Barrington Tops. It grows in rainforest and rainforest margins.

== Cultivation ==
Lomatia arborescens adapts readily to cultivation with a sunny or part-shaded aspect. Horticulturally, it is of potential because of its attractive leaves rather than its flowers, which are not prominent. In cultivation, it requires some degree of moisture.
