= Thaxterogaster talus =

Scientific classification
- Kingdom: Fungi
- Division: Basidiomycota
- Class: Agaricomycetes
- Order: Agaricales
- Family: Cortinariaceae
- Genus: Thaxterogaster
- Species: T. talus

Binomial name
- Thaxterogaster talus Fr. Niskanen and Liimat.

Synonyms
- Cortinarius talus Fr.

Species of fungus

Thaxterogaster talus
- Mycological characteristics
- Gills on hymenium
- Cap is convex
- Hymenium is adnate
- Stipe has a cortina
- Spore print is reddish-brown
- Ecology is mycorrhizal
- Edibility is unknown

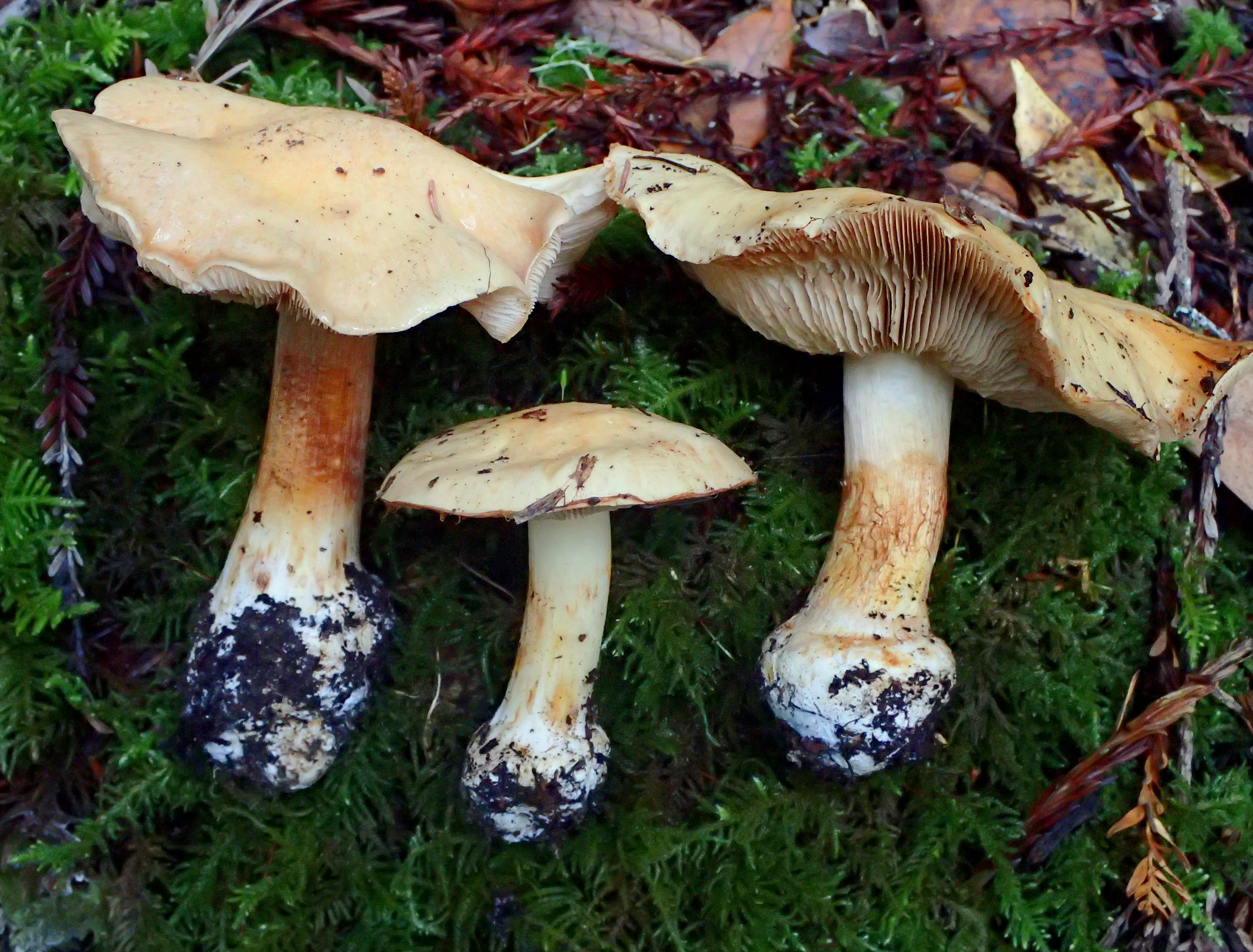
Thaxterogaster talus at Jackson Demonstration State Forest, California, USA

Thaxterogaster talus, formerly known as Cortinarius talus and commonly known as the honey-scented webcap, is a species of mushroom in the family Cortinariaceae.

== Description ==
The cream to buff-colored cap of Thaxterogaster talus is about 3.5-11 centimeters in diameter. It is slimy when wet. The gills are cream-colored and adnate to notched. The stipe is about 3.4-4.4 centimeters tall and 1.1-1.7 centimeters wide at the top. It is bulbous at the base. A cortina is present and the spore print is rusty brown. This mushroom is reported to smell sweet.

== Habitat and ecology ==
Thaxterogaster talus is found under several different kinds of trees, such as aspen, shore pine, and fir. It occurs in the Pacific Northwest.
