= Universal veil =

Temporary membraneous tissue

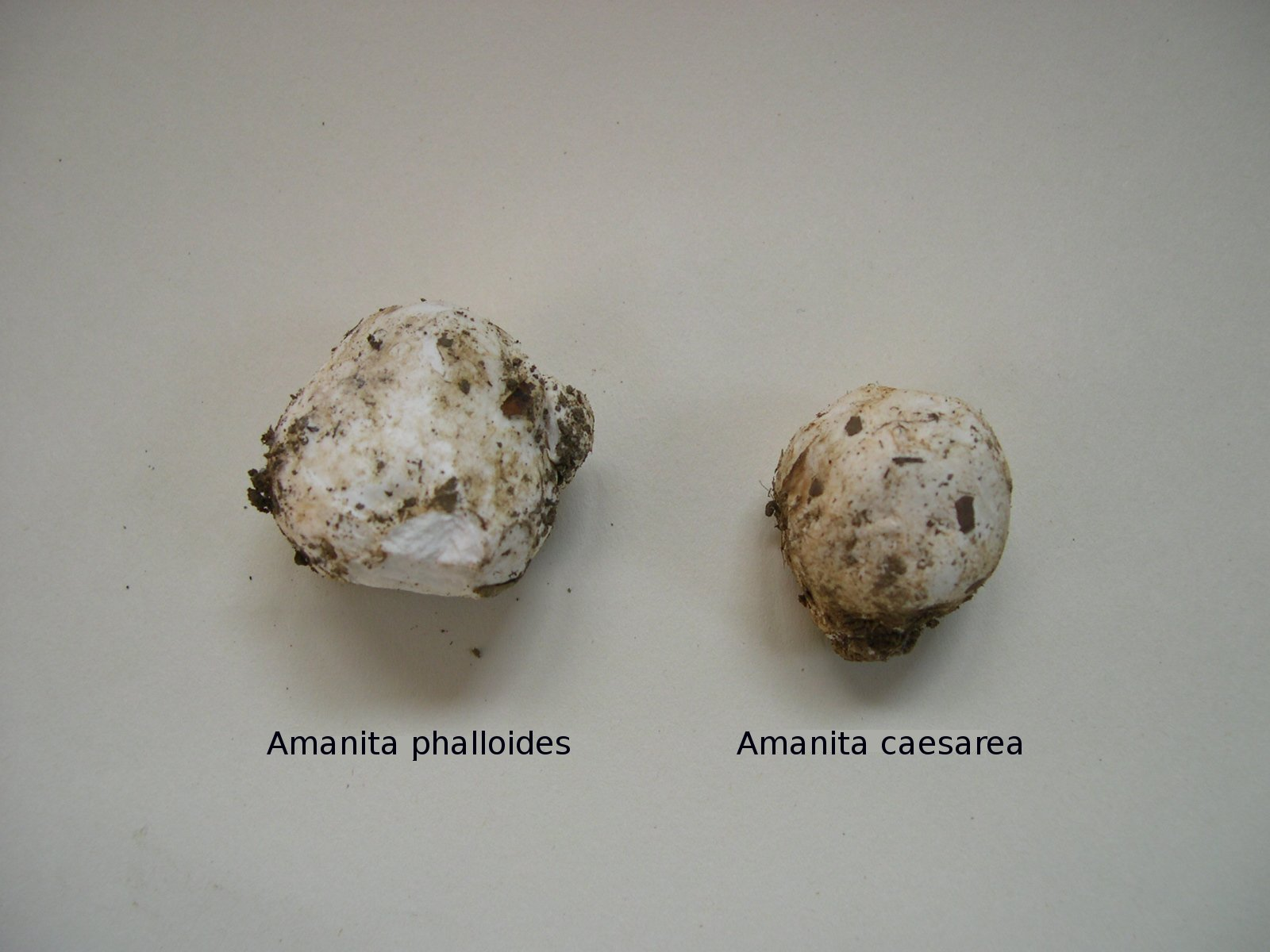
Immature fruiting bodies of two different mushrooms encased in a universal veil - deadly poisonous Amanita phalloides (left) and edible Amanita caesarea (right)

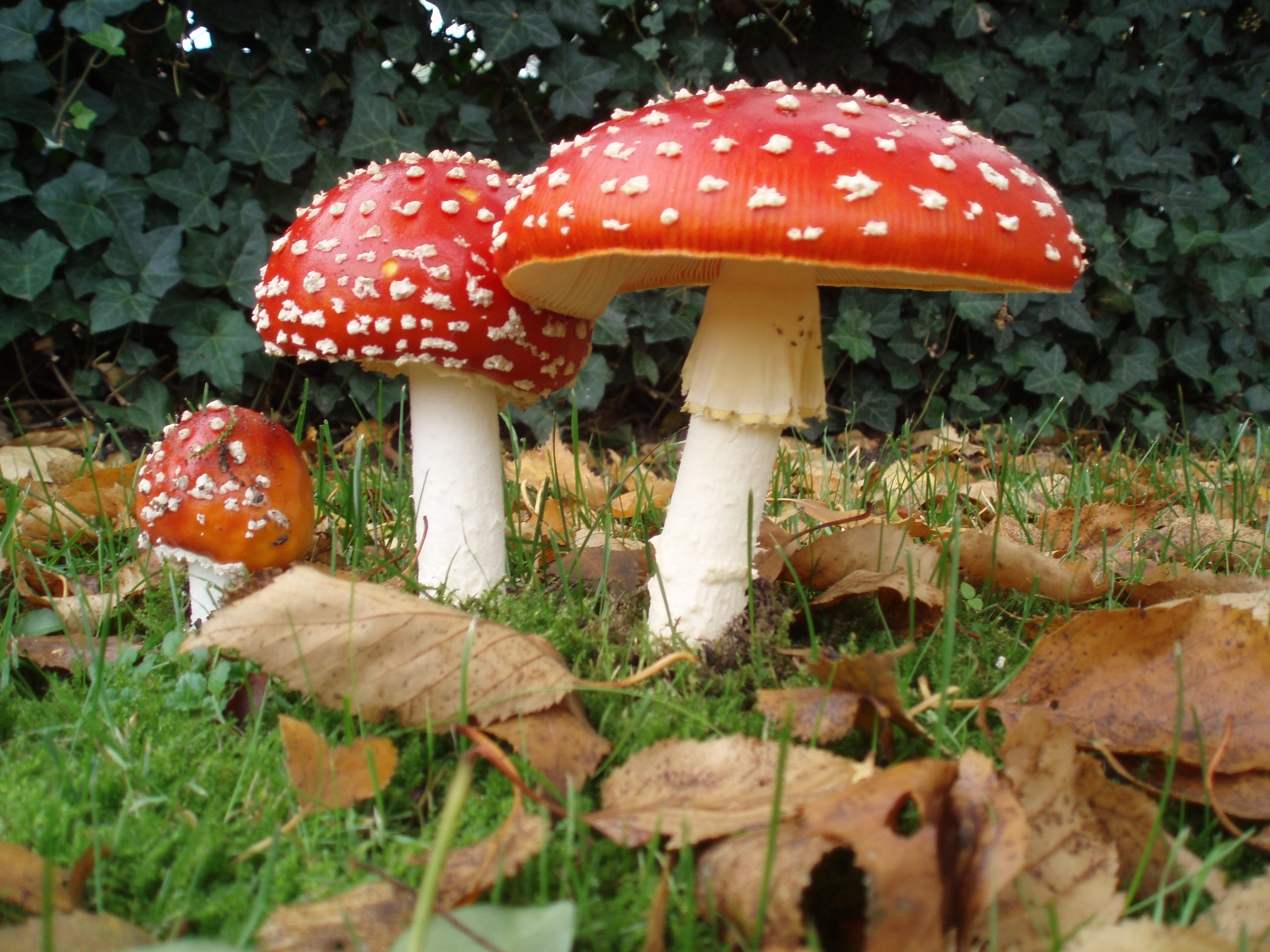
The white patches on the caps of these Amanita muscaria mushrooms are remnants of universal veils.

In mycology, a universal veil is a temporary membranous tissue that fully envelops immature fruiting bodies of certain gilled mushrooms. The developing Caesar's mushroom (Amanita caesarea), for example, which may resemble a small white sphere at this point, is protected by this structure. The veil will eventually rupture and disintegrate by the force of the expanding and maturing mushroom, but will usually leave evidence of its former shape with remnants. These remnants include the volva, or cup-like structure at the base of the stipe, and patches or "warts" on top of the cap. This macrofeature is useful in wild mushroom identification because it is an easily observed, taxonomically significant feature. It is a character present among species of basidiomycete fungi belonging to the genera Amanita and Volvariella. This has particular importance due to the disproportionately high number of potentially lethal species contained within the former genus.

A membrane enveloping immature fruiting bodies of gasteroid fungi resembles a universal veil, but is called a peridium.

== See also ==
- Partial veil
- Veil (mycology)
