= List of Pluteus species =

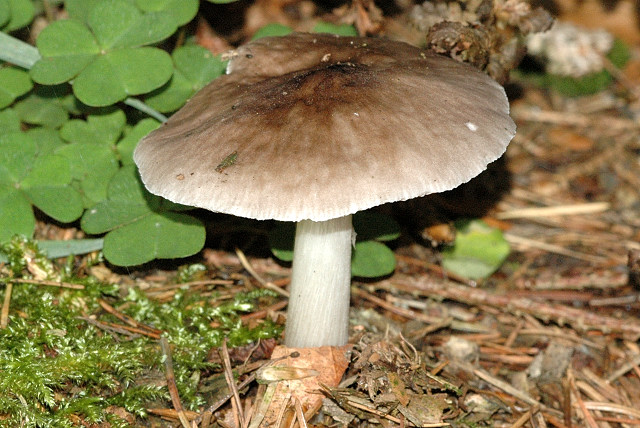
Pluteus brunneoradiatus

This is an incomplete list of species in the agaric genus Pluteus. Species of Pluteus are commonly found growing on woody substrates including stumps, logs, fallen branches, woody debris such as sawdust, and buried wood.

Three sections are widely accepted in Pluteus, including Pluteus, Hispidoderma Fayod, and Celluloderma Fayod. Section Pluteus is characterized by fruit bodies with a filamentous cap cuticle (pileipellis) and thick-walled pleurocystidia. Section Hispidoderma consists of species with a filamentous pileipellis and thin-walled pleurocystidia. Section Celluloderma is defined by a cystoderm pileipellis composed of ellipsoid to saccate-pyriform to vesiculose cells with or without cystidioid elements. The widespread genus contains over 300 species.

== Key ==
Name	The binomial name of the Pluteus species.
Authority	The author citation—the person who first described the species using an available scientific name, eventually combined with the one who placed it in Pluteus, and using standardized abbreviations.
Year	The year in which the species was named, or transferred to the genus Pluteus. Where the actual year of publication (as defined for the purpose of priority) differs from the date given in the material, the latter date is given in quotes.
Distribution	The distribution of the species.

== Species ==
Name	Authority	Year	Distribution
Pluteus admirabilis (Note: Edible)	(Peck) Peck	1885	USA
Pluteus aeolus	(Berk. & Broome) Sacc.	1887	Sri Lanka
Pluteus aestivus	Velen.	1920	Europe
Pluteus aethalus	(Berk. & M.A.Curtis) Sacc.	1887	Cuba
Pluteus affinis	Velen.	1920	Europe
Pluteus aglaeotheles	(Berk. & Broome) Sacc.	1887	Sri Lanka
Pluteus agriensis	Singer	1977	Ecuador
Pluteus alachuanus	Murrill	1945	USA
Pluteus albineus	Bonnard	2001	Switzerland
Pluteus albolineatus	(Berk. & Broome) Sacc.	1887	syn. P. argilophyllus)
Pluteus albostipitatus	(Dennis) Singer	1959	Trinidad, South America
Pluteus alniphilus	Deparis	2003	France
Pluteus amazonicus	Singer	1989	Brazil
Pluteus americanus	(P. Banerjee & Sundb.) Justo, E.F. Malysheva & Minnis (2014)	2014	United States and Russia
Pluteus amphicystis	Singer	1959	Bolivia
Pluteus angustisporus	Singer	1959	Bolivia
Pluteus aporpus	Singer	1954	South America
Pluteus aquosus	Singer	1956	Argentina
Pluteus argentinensis	Singer	1956	Argentina
Pluteus argilophyllus	(Berk. & Broome) Pegler	1956	Asia (syn. P. albolineatus)
Pluteus atrofuscens	Hongo	1963	Japan
Pluteus atromarginatus	(Konrad) Kühner	1935	Europe
Pluteus atropungens	A.H.Sm. & Bartelli	1965	USA
Pluteus aurantiacus	Murrill	1917	USA
Pluteus aurantiopustulatus	E.Horak	1977	Africa
Pluteus aurantiorugosus	(Trog) Sacc.	1896	Europe
Pluteus aurantipes	Minnis, Sundb. & Nelsen	2006	USA
Pluteus australis	Murrill	1945	Florida
Pluteus avellaneus	Murrill	1917	USA
Pluteus beniensis	Singer	1959	Bolivia
Pluteus betulinus	(Velen.) Noordel.	1979	Europe
Pluteus bii	Minnis & Sundb.	2008	China
Pluteus bressollensis	Eyssart., Ducousso & Buyck	2009	New Caledonia
Pluteus bruchii	(Speg.) Singer	1951	South America
Pluteus brunneidiscus	Murrill	1917	USA
Pluteus brunneo-olivaceus	E.Horak	1964	South America
Pluteus brunneopictus	(Berk. & Broome) Sacc.	1887	Sri Lanka
Pluteus brunneopunctus	E.Horak	1964	South America
Pluteus brunneoradiatus	Bonnard	1987	Switzerland
Pluteus brunneosquamulosus	Pradeep & Vrinda	2012	India
Pluteus bulbigerus	E.Horak	1964	South America
Pluteus bulbipes	Henn.	1901	Africa
Pluteus bulbosus	S.Imai	1938	Japan
Pluteus burserae	Singer	1959	Bolivia
Pluteus californicus	McClatchie	1897	USA
Pluteus campanulatus	Murrill	1917	USA
Pluteus carneipes	Kühner	1950	Europe
Pluteus carneobrunneolus	E.Horak	1964	South America
Pluteus castri	Justo & Minnis	2011	Japan, Russia
Pluteus cervinus	(Schaeff.) P.Kumm.	1871	Widespread
Pluteus chrysaegis	(Berk. & Broome) Petch	1912	Asia
Pluteus chrysophaeus	(Schaeff.) Quél.	1872	Widespread
Pluteus chrysophlebius	(Berk. & M.A.Curtis) Sacc.	1887	USA
Pluteus chusqueaecolus	E.Horak	1964	South America
Pluteus cinerascens	P.Banerjee & Sundb.	1993	USA
Pluteus cinereofuscus	Lange	1917	Europe
Pluteus cinerellus	Singer	1956	USA
Pluteus circumscissus	Singer	1959	Bolivia
Pluteus citrinocarnescens	Henn.	1901	Africa
Pluteus citrinus	Murrill	1941	Florida
Pluteus combustorum	Velen.	1929	Europe
Pluteus compressipes	Murrill	1917	Jamaica
Pluteus concentricus	E.Horak	2008	New Zealand
Pluteus congolensis	Beeli	1928	Africa
Pluteus conizatus	(Berk. & Broome) Sacc.	1887	Sri Lanka
Pluteus crenulatus	Justo, Battistin & Angelini	2012	Dominican Republic
Pluteus cubensis	(Murrill) Dennis	1953	Caribbean
Pluteus cyanopus	Quél.	1883	Africa, Europe, and North America
Pluteus daidoi	S.Ito & S.Imai	1940	Japan
Pluteus deceptivus	Minnis & Sundb.	2010	USA
Pluteus decoloratus	E.Horak	2008	New Zealand
Pluteus defibulatus	Singer	1952	Argentina
Pluteus delicatulus	C.K.Pradeep & K.B.Vrinda	2006	India
Pluteus deliquescens	Murrill	1917	USA
Pluteus dennisii	Singer	1989	Trinidad-Tobago
Pluteus densifibrillosus	Menolli & Capelari	2010	Brazil
Pluteus depauperatus	Romagn.	1956	Europe
Pluteus diettrichii	Bres.	1905	Europe
Pluteus diptychocystis	Singer	1954	South America
Pluteus diverticulatus	Corriol	2004	France
Pluteus dominicanus	Singer	1961	South America
Pluteus earlei	Murrill	1911	Cuba
Pluteus eliae	Singer	1959	Bolivia
Pluteus eludens	E.F.Malysheva, Minnis & Justo	2011	Madeira, Portugal, Russia, USA
Pluteus ephebeus	(Fr.) Gillet	1876	Europe
Pluteus escharites	(Berk. & Broome) Sacc.	1887	Sri Lanka
Pluteus espeletiae	Singer	1961	South America
Pluteus eucryphiae	Singer	1969	Chile
Pluteus eugraptus	(Berk. & Broome) Sacc.	1887	Widespread
Pluteus eupigmentatus	Singer	1959	Argentina, Bolivia
Pluteus excentricus	Velen.	1920	Europe
Pluteus exiguus	(Pat.) Sacc.	1887	Europe
Pluteus exilis	Singer	1989	USA
Pluteus fallax	Singer	1959	Brazil
Pluteus fastigiatus	Singer	1952	South America
Pluteus favrei	Antonín & Škubla	2000	Slovak Republic
Pluteus fenzlii	(Schulzer) Corriol & P.-A.Moreau	2007	Europe
Pluteus fernandezianus	Singer	1959	Chile
Pluteus fibrillosus	Murrill	1917	USA
Pluteus fibulatus	Singer	1951	South America
Pluteus flammipes	E.Horak	1964	South America
Pluteus flavipes	Petch	1924	Asia
Pluteus flavofuligineus	G.F.Atk	1902	USA
Pluteus flavomarginatus	Petch	1922	Asia
Pluteus floridanus	Murrill	1943	Florida, USA
Pluteus fluminensis	Singer	1959	Brazil
Pluteus fraxineus	Velen.	1929	Europe
Pluteus fuligineovenosus	E.Horak	1964	South America
Pluteus fuliginosus	Murrill	1917	USA
Pluteus fulvobadius	Murrill	1917	USA
Pluteus fusconigricans	(Berk. & Broome) Sacc.	1887	Sri Lanka
Pluteus giganteus	Massee	1896	South America
Pluteus glabrescens	Murrill	1917	USA
Pluteus glaucotinctus	E.Horak	1977	Africa
Pluteus glaucus	Singer	1961	South America
Pluteus globiger	Singer	1951	South America
Pluteus glyphidatus	(Berk. & Broome) Sacc.	1887	Sri Lanka
Pluteus glutinosus	Singer	1989	Panama
Pluteus grandineus	(Berk. & Broome) Sacc.	1887	Sri Lanka
Pluteus granularis	Peck	1985	USA
Pluteus griseobrunneus	Murrill	1917	USA
Pluteus griseoluridus	P.D.Orton	1984	Europe
Pluteus griseoroseus	Beeli	1928	Africa
Pluteus harrisii	Murrill	1911	Jamaica
Pluteus haywardii	Singer	1956	South America
Pluteus hendersoniensis	Singer	1989	Oceania
Pluteus heterocystis	P.Banerjee & Sundb.	1993	USA
Pluteus heteromarginatus	Justo	2011	USA
Pluteus hiatulus	Kühner	1953	Europe
Pluteus hiemalis	Singer	1959	Argentina
Pluteus hispidilacteus	E.Horak	2008	New Zealand
Pluteus hispidulus	(Fr.) Gillet	1876	Asia, Europe
Pluteus hololeucus	Singer	1956	Argentina
Pluteus homolae	Minnis & Sundb.	2010	USA
Pluteus hongoi	Singer	1989	Japan
Pluteus horakianus	Rodr.-Alcánt.	2009	
Pluteus horridilamellus	S.Ito & S.Imai	1940	Japan
Pluteus horridus	Singer	1973	Mexico
Pluteus hylaeicola	Singer	1989	Brazil
Pluteus iguazuensis	Singer	1956	Argentina
Pluteus inconspicuus	E.Horak	2008	New Zealand
Pluteus inflatus	Velen.	1920	Europe
Pluteus inocybirimosus	E.Horak	1964	South America
Pluteus inquilinus	Romagn.	1979	France
Pluteus insidiosus	Vellinga & Schreurs	1985	Europe
Pluteus jamaicensis	Murrill	1911	Jamaica, North America, South America
Pluteus keissleri	Singer	1929	Europe
Pluteus kobayasii	Hongo	1976	Papua New Guinea
Pluteus kuthanii	Singer	1989	former Czechoslovakia
Pluteus laetifrons	(Berk. & M.A.Curtis) Sacc.	1887	Cuba
Pluteus laetus	Singer	1959	Bolivia
Pluteus laricinus	P.Banerjee & Sundb.	1993	USA
Pluteus latifolius	Murrill	1917	USA
Pluteus leaianus	Singer	1973	USA
Pluteus leoninus	(Schaeff.) P.Kumm.	1871	Europe
Pluteus lepiotiformis	Murrill	1917	USA
Pluteus leucocyanescens	Singer	1973	Mexico
Pluteus lilacinus	(Sacc.) Singer	1961	USA
Pluteus lipidocystis	Bonnard	1986	Switzerland
Pluteus longipes	Murrill	1917	USA
Pluteus longistriatus	(Peck) Peck	1885	USA
Pluteus losulus	(Beeli) Justo	2011	Africa
Pluteus luctuosus	Boud.	1905	Europe
Pluteus ludovicianus	Murrill	1917	North America
Pluteus luteostipitatus	C.K.Pradeep & K.B.Vrinda	2008	India
Pluteus lutescens	(Fr.) Bres.	1929	cosmopolitan
Pluteus luteus	(Redhead & B.Liu) Redhead	1984	China
Pluteus machidae	S.Ito & S.Imai	1940	Japan
Pluteus maculosipes	Singer	1961	South America
Pluteus magnus	McClatchie	1897	USA
Pluteus major	Singer	1989	USA
Pluteus mammifer	Romagn.	1979	France
Pluteus mammillatus	(Longyear) Minnis, Sundb. & Methven	2006	USA
Pluteus martinicensis	Singer & Fiard	1983	Martinique
Pluteus melanopotamicus	Singer	1989	Brazil
Pluteus melleipes	Murrill	1917	USA
Pluteus melleus	Murrill	1917	USA
Pluteus mesosporus	Singer	1961	South America
Pluteus microspermus	E.Horak	2008	New Zealand
Pluteus microsporus	(Dennis) Singer	1956	Trinidad
Pluteus minor	G.Stev.	1962	New Zealand
Pluteus minutus	Pat.	1909	Asia
Pluteus multiformis	Justo, A.Caball. & G.Muñoz	2011	Spain
Pluteus multistriatus	Murrill	1911	Mexico
Pluteus myceniformis	Murrill	1917	Jamaica
Pluteus nanellus	Murrill	1917	USA
Pluteus nanus	(Pers.) P.Kumm.	1871	
Pluteus neophlebophorus	Singer	1959	Bolivia
Pluteus neotropicalis	Rodr.-Alcánt.	2008	Mexico
Pluteus nevadensis	Rodr.-Alcánt.	2010	Mexico
Pluteus nigrofloccosus	(R.Schulz) J.Favre	1948	Switzerland
Pluteus nigrolineatus	Murrill	1939	Florida
Pluteus nigropallescens	Singer	1961	South America
Pluteus nigroviridis	Babos	1983	Hungary
Pluteus nitens	Pat.	1898	Mexico
Pluteus niveus	Murrill	1917	USA
Pluteus nothofagi	E.Horak	1964	South America
Pluteus nothopellitus	Justo & M.L.Castro	2007	Spain
Pluteus ochraceus	E.Horak	1964	South America
Pluteus okabei	S.Ito & S.Imai	1940	Japan
Pluteus oligocystis	Singer	1959	Bolivia
Pluteus osornensis	E.Horak	1964	South America
Pluteus pallescens	P.D.Orton	1960	UK
Pluteus pallidocervinus	Murrill	1917	USA
Pluteus pallidus	Homola	1960	Europe, North America
Pluteus pantherinus	Courtec. & M.Uchida	1991	Japan
Pluteus paradoxus	E.Horak	2008	New Zealand
Pluteus paraensis	Singer	1973	Brazil
Pluteus pauperculus	E.Horak	2008	New Zealand
Pluteus pellitus	(Pers.) P.Kumm.	1871	Europe
Pluteus perroseus	E.Horak	1983	Oceania
Pluteus petasatus	(Fr.) Gillet	1876	Europe
Pluteus phaeocephalus	Har.Takah.	2001	Japan
Pluteus phaeocyanopus	Minnis & Sundb.	2010	USA
Pluteus phaeoleucus	E.Horak	1977	Africa
Pluteus phlebophoroides	Henn.	1896	(type is lost, incertae sedis)
Pluteus phlebophorus	(Ditmar) P.Kumm.	1871	Europe
Pluteus pilatii	Velen.	1929	Europe
Pluteus plautus	(Weinm.) Gillet	1876	
Pluteus pluvialis	Singer	1959	Bolivia
Pluteus podospileus	Sacc. & Cub.	1887	
Pluteus poliocnemis	Kühner	1956	France
Pluteus polycystis	Singer	1959	Argentina
Pluteus pouzarianus	Singer	1983	
Pluteus praerugosus	Murrill	1920	USA
Pluteus primus	Bonnard	1993	Switzerland
Pluteus pseudeugraptus	E.Horak	1964	South America
Pluteus pseudorobertii	M.M.Moser	1953	Europe
Pluteus psichriophorus	(Berk. & Broome) Sacc.	1887	Sri Lanka
Pluteus puberulus	Velen.	1920	Europe
Pluteus pulverulentus	Murrill	1917	Grenada
Pluteus pulvinus	(Berk. & Broome) Sacc.	1887	
Pluteus pumilis	Murrill	1946	USA
Pluteus pusillulus	Romagn.	1940	Europe
Pluteus puttemansii	Menolli & Capelari	2010	Brazil
Pluteus raphaniodorus	E.Horak	1964	South America
Pluteus readiarum	G.Stev.	1962	New Zealand
Pluteus reisneri	Velen.	1920	Europe
Pluteus reticulatus	Murrill	1911	Jamaica
Pluteus rhoadsii	Murrill	1939	USA
Pluteus riberaltensis	Singer	1959	Bolivia
Pluteus ricardii	Singer	1969	Chile
Pluteus rimosoaffinis	Singer	1879	Argentina
Pluteus rimosellus	Singer	1951	South America
Pluteus rimosus	Murrill	1911	Jamaica
Pluteus rimulosus	Romagn.	1956	Europe
Pluteus riograndensis	Singer	1953	South America
Pluteus robertii	(Fr.) P.Karst.	1879	
Pluteus romellii	(Britzelm.) Sacc.	1895	
Pluteus roseocandidus	G.F.Atk.	1909	USA
Pluteus rubrotomentosus	Singer	1959	Bolivia
Pluteus rugosidiscus	Murrill	1917	USA
Pluteus rugososulcatus	Singer	1959	Bolivia
Pluteus sabulosus	E.Horak	2008	New Zealand
Pluteus salicinus	(Pers.) P.Kumm.	1871	Cosmopolitan
Pluteus salmoneus	Sathe & S.M.Kulk.	1981	India
Pluteus sancti-xaverii	Singer	1959	Argentina
Pluteus sandalioticus	Contu & Arras	2001	Sardinia, Italy
Pluteus sapiicola	Singer	1959	Argentina
Pluteus satur	Kühner & Romagn.	1956	Europe
Pluteus saupei	Justo & Minnis	2011	USA
Pluteus sergii	Singer	1959	Bolivia
Pluteus seticeps	(G.F.Atk.) Singer	1959	USA
Pluteus silentvalleyanus	C.K.Pradeep & K.B.Vrinda	2008	India
Pluteus similis	E.Horak	2008	New Zealand
Pluteus spegazzinianus	Singer	1952	Argentina
Pluteus spilopus	(Berk. & Broome) Sacc.	1887	Sri Lanka
Pluteus spinosae	Velen.	1939	Europe
Pluteus spinulosus	Murrill	1917	Honduras
Pluteus squamosidiscus	Murrill	1917	USA
Pluteus squamosopunctus	E.Horak	1964	South America
Pluteus stenotrichus	Justo, Battistin & Angelini	2012	Dominican Republic
Pluteus stephanobasis	Singer	1959	Argentina
Pluteus sterili-marginatus	Peck	1885	USA
Pluteus sternbergii	Velen.	1920	Europe
Pluteus stigmatophorus	(Berk. & Broome) Sacc.	1887	Sri Lanka
Pluteus straminellus	Rick	1961	Brazil
Pluteus striatocystis	Pegler	1977	Africa
Pluteus stylobates	Velen.	1920	Europe
Pluteus subantarcticus	E.Horak	2008	New Zealand
Pluteus subcervinus	(Berk. & Broome) Sacc.	1887	Sri Lanka
Pluteus subfibrillosus	Singer	1959	Brazil
Pluteus subgriseibrunneus	Murrill	1945	USA
Pluteus submarginatus	E.Horak	1964	South America
Pluteus subminutus	Singer	1959	Bolivia
Pluteus subspinulosus	E.Horak	1964	South America
Pluteus substigmaticus	Singer	1959	Bolivia
Pluteus sulcatus	Singer	1951	South America
Pluteus sulfureus	Velen.	1920	Europe
Pluteus suzae	Velen.	1939	Europe
Pluteus terricola	E.Horak	2008	New Zealand
Pluteus thomsonii	(Berk. & Broome) Dennis	1948	UK
Pluteus tiliacius	Velen.	1920	Europe
Pluteus tomentosulus	(Pers.) P.Kumm.	1871	USA
Pluteus tricuspidatus	Velen.	1939	Europe
Pluteus triplocystis	Singer	1973	Mexico
Pluteus tucumanus	Singer	1951	South America
Pluteus ugandensis	Pegler	1977	Africa
Pluteus umbrinidiscus	Murrill	1917	USA
Pluteus umbrinoalbidus	Singer	1953	South America
Pluteus umbrosus	(Pers.) P.Kumm.	1871	Europe
Pluteus unakensis	Murrill	1917	USA
Pluteus variabilicolor	Babos	1978	Hungary
Pluteus variipes	Singer	1989	Argentina
Pluteus varzeicola	Singer	1989	Brazil
Pluteus velatus	Rick	1961	Brazil
Pluteus velutinornatus	G.Stev.	1962	New Zealand
Pluteus velutinus	Pradeep & Vrinda	2012	India
Pluteus venosus	Singer	1959	USA
Pluteus venosus	Singer	1959	USA
Pluteus verae-crucis	Cifuentes & Guzmán	1962	Mexico
Pluteus veronicae	G.Stev.	1962	New Zealand
Pluteus verruculosus	S.Ito & S.Imai	1940	Japan
Pluteus viscidulus	Singer	1951	South America
Pluteus washingtonensis	Murrill	1917	USA
Pluteus whiteae	Murrill	1917	USA
Pluteus xanthopus	Singer	1958	Argentina
Pluteus xylophilus	(Speg.) Singer	1951	South America
Pluteus yungensis	Singer	1959	Bolivia
