= Pluteus brunneosquamulosus =

Scientific classification
- Domain: Eukaryota
- Kingdom: Fungi
- Division: Basidiomycota
- Class: Agaricomycetes
- Order: Agaricales
- Family: Pluteaceae
- Genus: Pluteus
- Species: P. brunneosquamulosus

Binomial name
- Pluteus brunneosquamulosus Pradeep & Vrinda (2012)

Species of fungus

Pluteus brunneosquamulosus is a species of agaric fungus in the family Pluteaceae. It is found in India.

== See also ==
- List of Pluteus species
