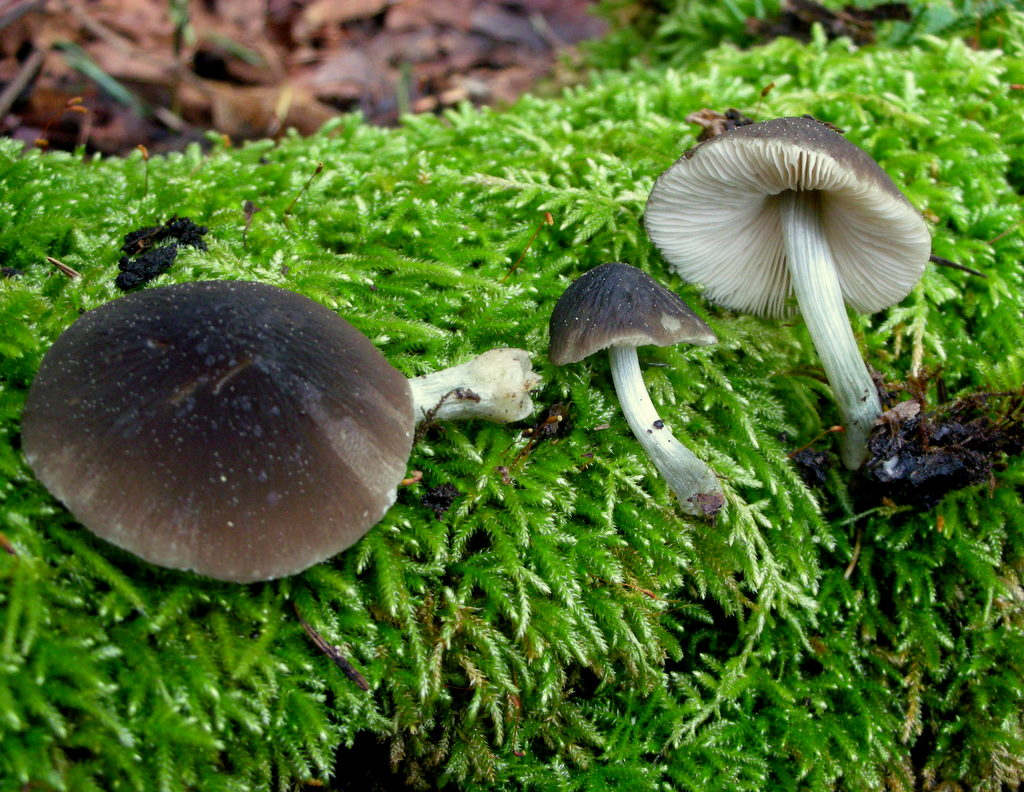

Scientific classification
- Domain: Eukaryota
- Kingdom: Fungi
- Division: Basidiomycota
- Class: Agaricomycetes
- Order: Agaricales
- Family: Pluteaceae
- Genus: Pluteus
- Species: P. phaeocyanopus

Binomial name
- Pluteus phaeocyanopus Minnis & Sundb. (2010)

= Pluteus phaeocyanopus =

Species of fungus

Pluteus phaeocyanopus is an agaric fungus in the family Pluteaceae. Described as a new species in 2010, it has only been collected from California, where it grows singularly or in groups on the decaying wood of oak. The fruit body has a smooth brown cap measuring 2–4 cm (0.8–1.6 in) in diameter. The stipe is 2–5 cm (0.8–2.0 in) long by 0.4–0.8 cm (0.16–0.31 in) thick, and roughly equal in width throughout. It is whitish but becomes grayish-green near the base. The thin and fragile gills are free from attachment to the stipe, close to somewhat distantly placed, and interspersed with several tiers of lamellulae (short gills). The flesh has no distinctive taste or odor. The spores are spherical or nearly so and measure 6.2–8.4 by 5.7–7.9 μm.

The species was originally collected from San Francisco (California) in 1966 by American mycologist Harry D. Thiers and assigned to Pluteus cyanopus. However, a reexamination of the type material revealed that it has microscopic characters distinct from that species, which prompted authors Andrew Minnis and Walter Sundberg to describe the California collection as a new species.

== See also ==
- List of Pluteus species
