= Pluteus podospileus =

Scientific classification
- Kingdom: Fungi
- Division: Basidiomycota
- Class: Agaricomycetes
- Order: Agaricales
- Family: Pluteaceae
- Genus: Pluteus
- Species: P. podospileus

Binomial name
- Pluteus podospileus Sacc. & Cub.

Species of fungus

Pluteus podospileus
- Mycological characteristics
- Gills on hymenium
- Cap is convex or umbonate
- Hymenium is free
- Stipe is bare
- Spore print is salmon to pinkish-brown
- Edibility is unknown

Pluteus podospileus is a species of mushroom in the family Pluteaceae. It is found in North America, Europe, and Australia.

== Description ==
The cap of Pluteus podospileus is brown in color and has a tomentose or velvety texture. It can be convex or umbonate. The gills start out white and become pinkish as the mushroom gets older. They are free. The stipe is mostly white in color and bulbous at the base. It is about 2.5-3.5 centimeters long and 0.3-0.4 centimeters wide. The spore print is brownish or dingy pink.

== Habitat and ecology ==
Pluteus podospileus is often found in disturbed areas. It grows on wood.
