= Pluteus aethalus =

Scientific classification
- Domain: Eukaryota
- Kingdom: Fungi
- Division: Basidiomycota
- Class: Agaricomycetes
- Order: Agaricales
- Family: Pluteaceae
- Genus: Pluteus
- Species: P. aethalus

Binomial name
- Pluteus aethalus (Berk. & M.A.Curtis) Sacc.

Synonyms
- Agaricus aethalus Berk. & M.A.Curtis (1869)

Species of fungus

Pluteus aethalus is a species of agaric fungus in the family Pluteaceae. It is found in Cuba. The species was originally named Agaricus aethalus by Miles Joseph Berkeley & Moses Ashley Curtis in 1869, and later transferred to the genus Pluteus by Pier Andrea Saccardo in 1887. It is classified in Pluteus section Celluloderma, subsection Mixtini.

== See also ==
- List of Pluteus species
