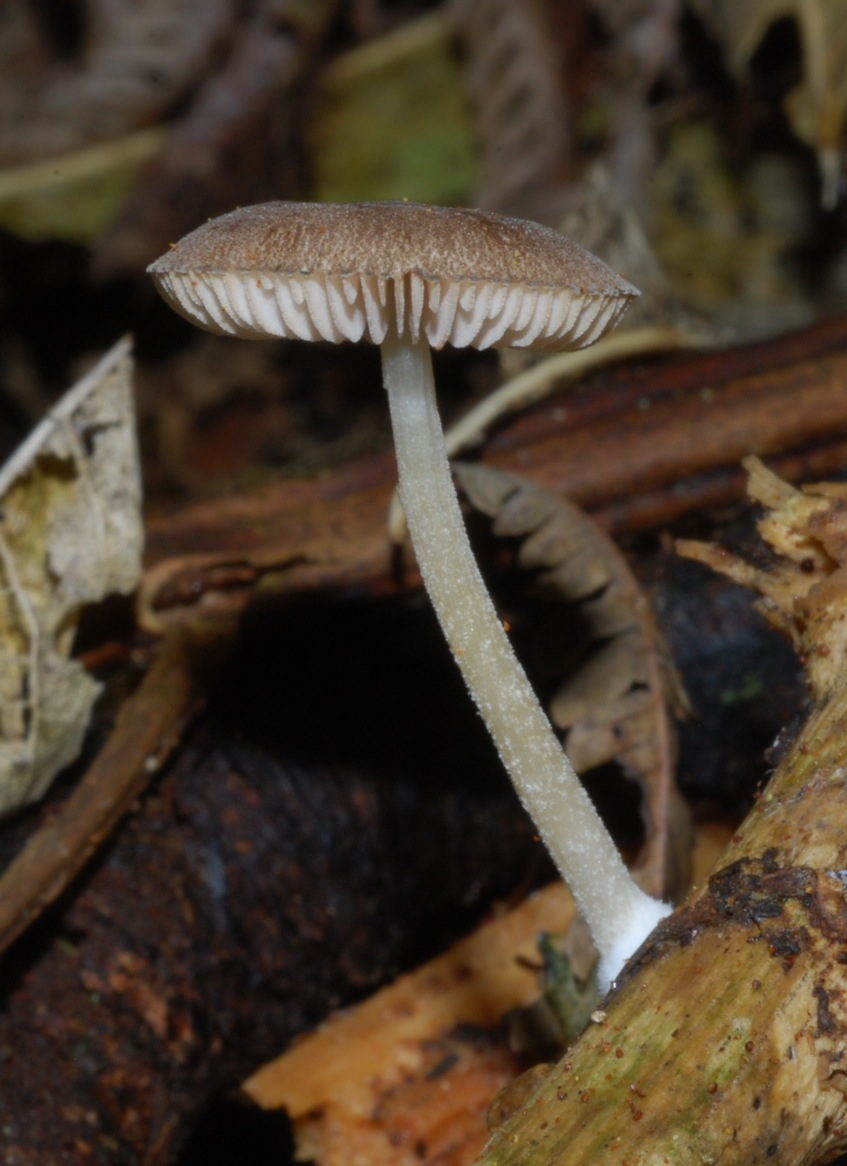

Scientific classification
- Domain: Eukaryota
- Kingdom: Fungi
- Division: Basidiomycota
- Class: Agaricomycetes
- Order: Agaricales
- Family: Pluteaceae
- Genus: Pluteus
- Species: P. readiarum

Binomial name
- Pluteus readiarum G.Stev. (1962)

= Pluteus readiarum =

Species of fungus

Pluteus readiarum is a species of mushroom in the family Pluteaceae. Found in New Zealand, it was described scientifically by New Zealand mycologist Greta Stevenson in 1962.

== Description ==
The cap is convex, reaching 3–3.5 cm (1.2–1.4 in) in diameter. The colour is yellow-fawn overlain by a dark-brown velvety network of thread-like filaments. The flesh is pale yellow-fawn. The gills are free from attachment to the stem, crowded closely together, and pink with whitish margins. The stipe is 4 cm (1.6 in) by 3–4 mm (0.12–0.16 in) thick, pale yellow with a grey tinge at the top, and covered with delicate, silky fibers. The base of the stipe is bulbous and surrounded by fuzzy white mycelia. The spore print is pink, and the individual spores measure 5 by 6 μm.

== See also ==
- List of Pluteus species
