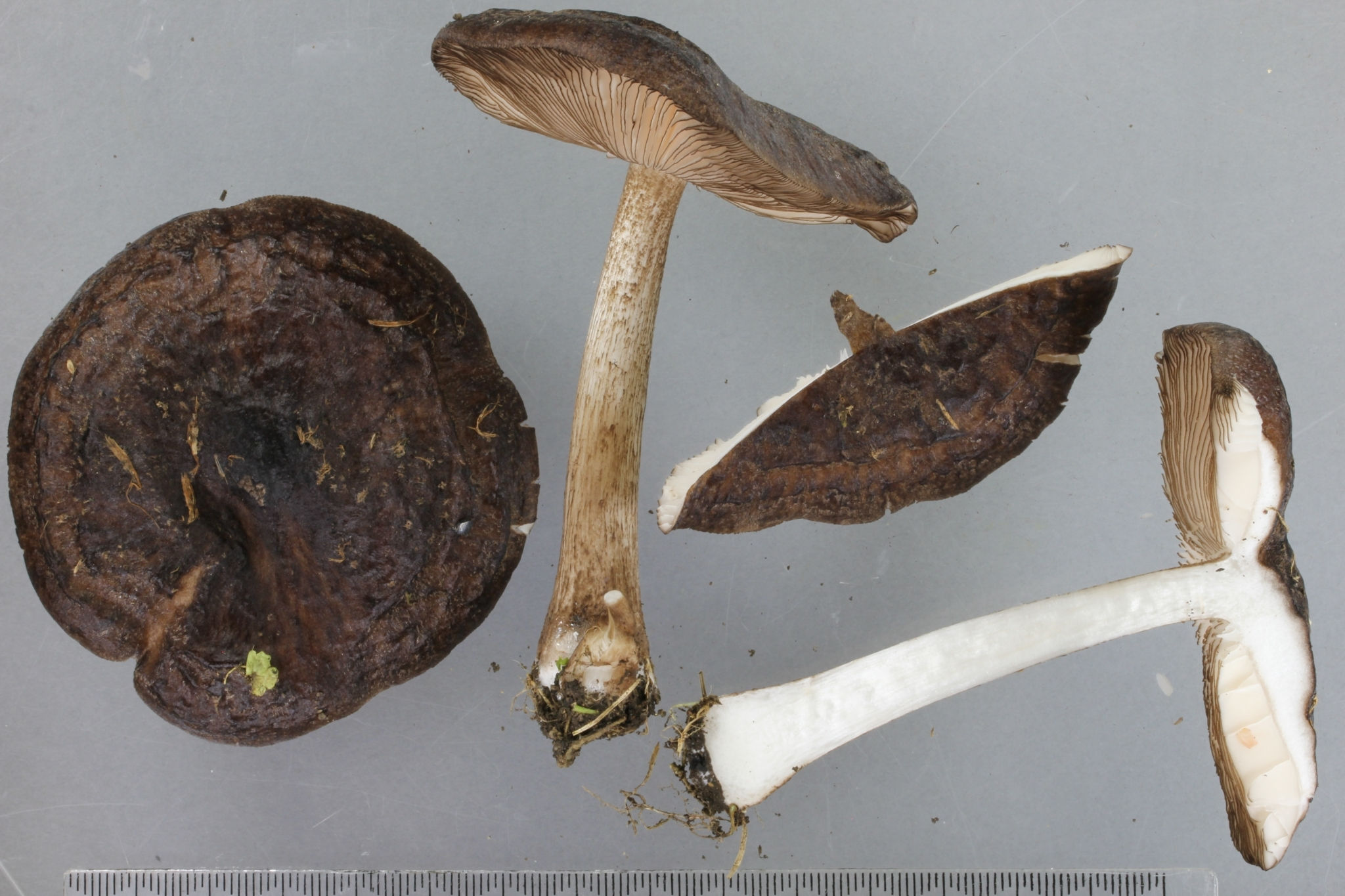

Scientific classification
- Domain: Eukaryota
- Kingdom: Fungi
- Division: Basidiomycota
- Class: Agaricomycetes
- Order: Agaricales
- Family: Pluteaceae
- Genus: Pluteus
- Species: P. microspermus

Binomial name
- Pluteus microspermus (E). Horak

= Pluteus microspermus =

Species of fungus

Pluteus microspermus is a saprotrophic, mushroom-like (agaricoid) fungi in the Section Pluteus. It is often confused with Pluteus concentricus, a species endemic to New Zealand because P. concentricus also has concentric ridges on its cap (pileus). P. microspermus and P. concentricus can be differentiated by microscopy as the spores are different sizes. P. concentricus also has rougher material on its stipe.

== Taxonomy ==
Pluteus microspermus was originally described by E. Horak in 1981 but first published in Volume 5 of The Fungi of New Zealand (2008). The holotype specimen was collected by E. Horak in 1981 from rotten wood or bark in the Waitākere Ranges near Piha, in New Zealand. The holotype is stored at The New Zealand Fungarium - Te Kohinga Hekaheka o Aotearoa in Auckland, New Zealand.

== Description ==
Pluteus microspermus has concentric ridges on its cap (pileus). The pileus can be light or dark brown with a sooty appearance and is large, between 40 and 100 mm in diameter. The pileus is slightly curved at the margin with a broad central lump (umbonate), but older mushrooms may have a central depression. The margin of the pileus is not curled under. The center of the pileus may feel velvety to touch.

The gills (lamellae) are not attached to the stipe and change colour, from a pale white through to pink and finally dark brown on the edges. The lamellae are ventricose, extending downward from the cap, appearing swollen. They are fine and tufty at the edges (floccose-fimbriate). The spore print is pink, like other species in the Pluteus genus. The spores themselves are small (5-6 x 3-3.35 μm) and smooth and contribute to etymology.

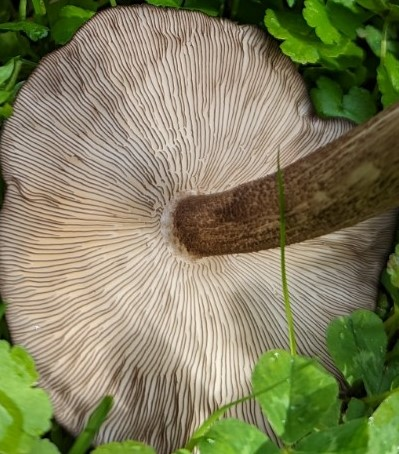

The stipe can be 50–100 mm tall. The base of the stipe is bulbous (18 mm diameter) and narrows to around 7-10mm diameter near the cap. The stipe is white to light grey but covered with rough brown fibrous material (fibrils) that look scaley.

== Habitat and distribution ==
Pluteus microspermus can be found growing on native broadleaf trees' rotten wood and bark, including Leptospermum, Kunzea, Fuscospora fusca and Lophozonia menziesii. P. microspermus is native and indigenous to New Zealand. It is found in both the North and South Islands. Its DNA sequence has also been observed in Argentina via soil samples. Fruit bodies (Basidiocarps) can be found during January to May (Summer to Autumn in New Zealand).

== Etymology ==
The genus name Pluteus translates roughly to "shield", "shed" or "screen". The specific epithet microspermus means little (micro) spores (spermus).

== Conservation status ==
Pluteus microspermus status is currently unknown due to a lack of data.
