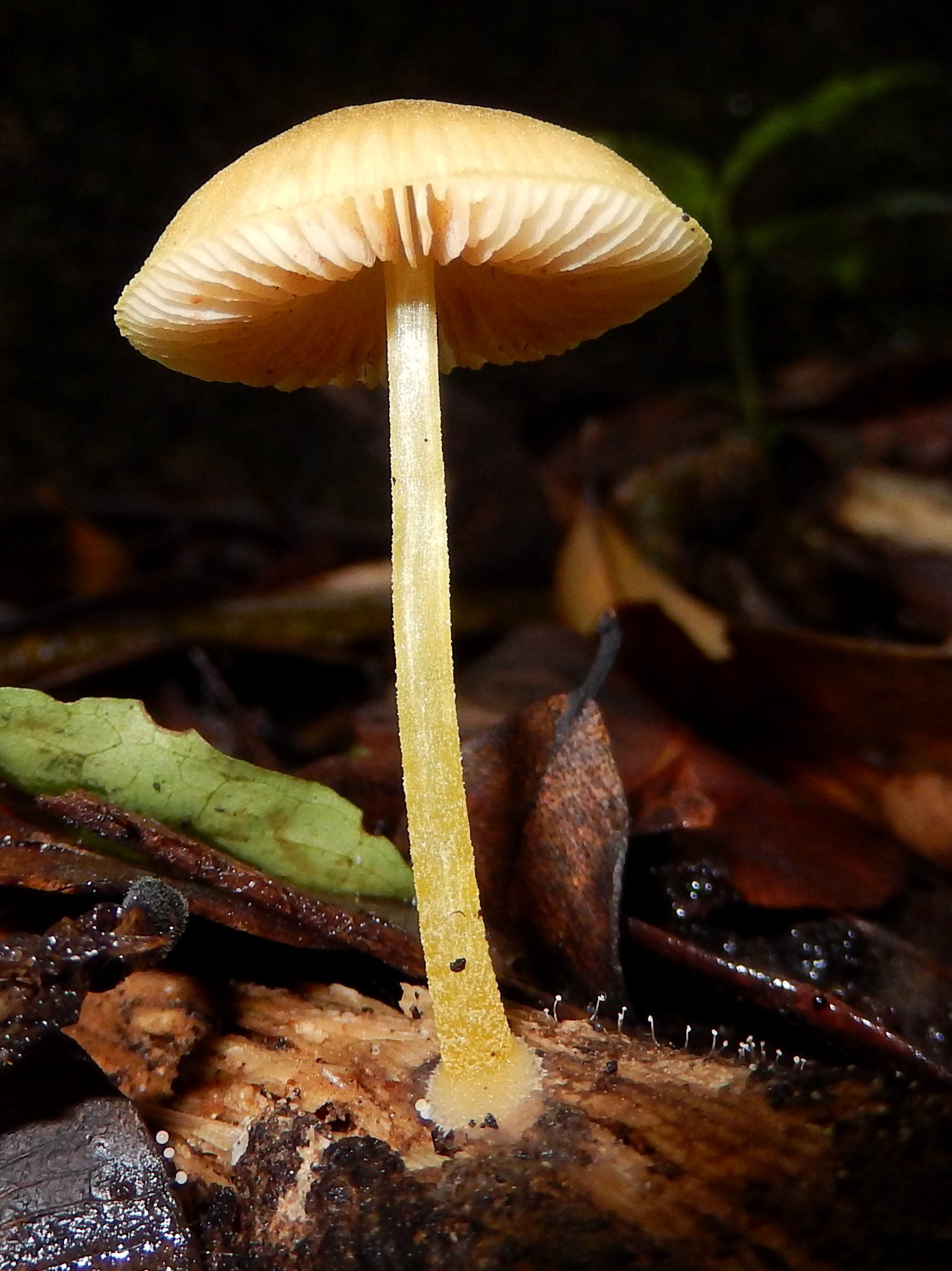
- Ferndale Park, Australia

Scientific classification
- Kingdom: Fungi
- Division: Basidiomycota
- Class: Agaricomycetes
- Order: Agaricales
- Family: Pluteaceae
- Genus: Pluteus
- Species: P. lutescens

Binomial name
- Pluteus lutescens (Fr.) Bres.

Synonyms
- Pluteus romellii (Britzelm.) Lapl.

= Pluteus lutescens =

Species of fungus

Pluteus lutescens is a mushroom in the Pluteaceae family.

The tannish cap is up to 5 centimetres (2 in) wide. The stalk is up to 7 cm tall and 6 millimetres (1/4 in) thick.The spore print is pinkish.

It is a cosmopolitan species often found on decaying wood.
