= Pluteus nigroviridis =

Scientific classification
- Kingdom: Fungi
- Division: Basidiomycota
- Class: Agaricomycetes
- Order: Agaricales
- Family: Pluteaceae
- Genus: Pluteus
- Species: P. nigroviridis

Binomial name
- Pluteus nigroviridis Babos (1983)

Species of fungus

Pluteus nigroviridis is a mushroom in the family Pluteaceae. Found in Europe, it was first described scientifically by Hungarian mycologist Margit Babos in 1983.

== Chemistry ==
Fruit bodies of the fungus contain the psychoactive compounds psilocin and psilocybin.

== See also ==
- List of Pluteus species
- List of Psilocybin mushrooms
