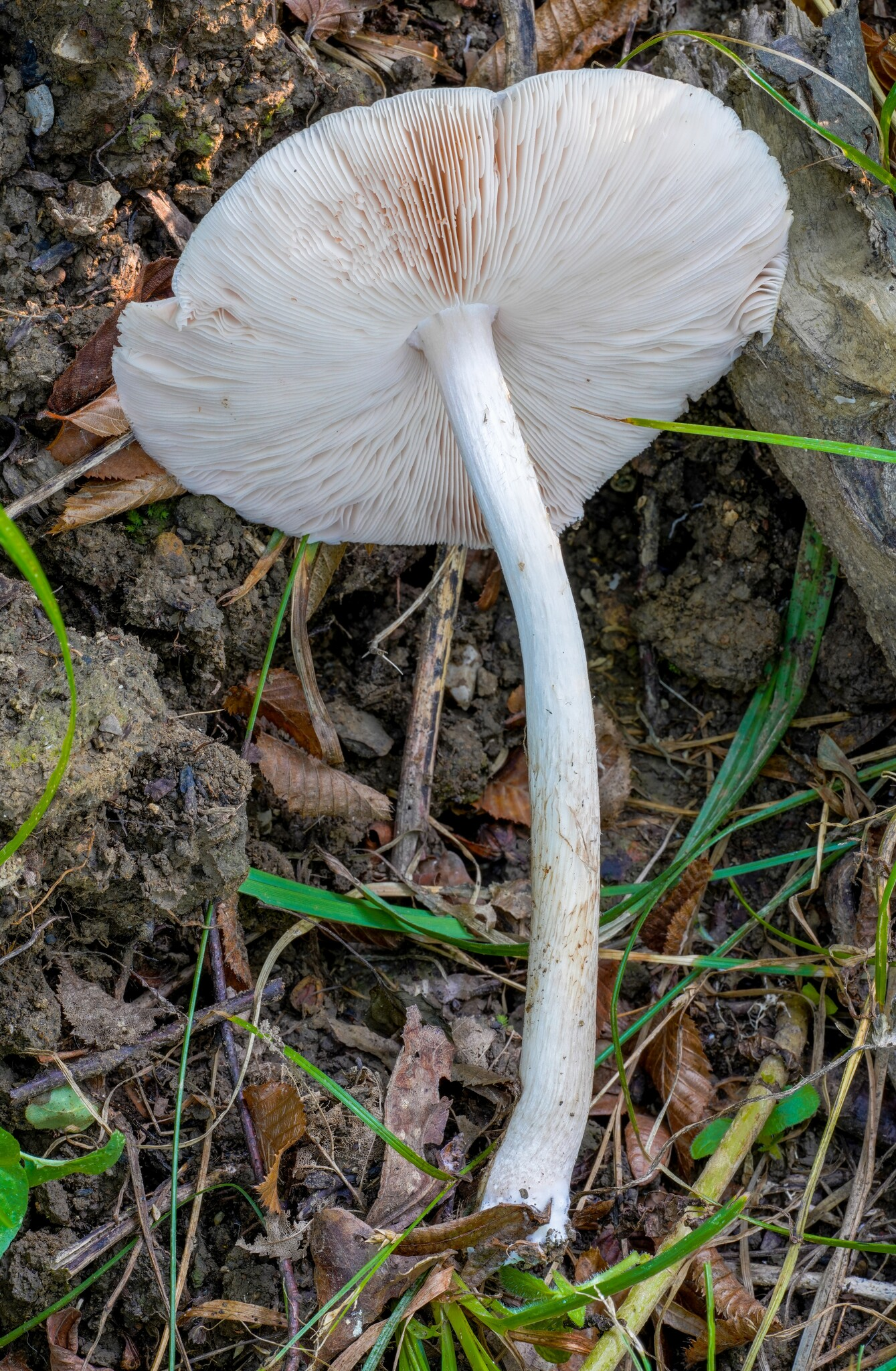
- In Slovenia

Scientific classification
- Kingdom: Fungi
- Division: Basidiomycota
- Class: Agaricomycetes
- Order: Agaricales
- Family: Pluteaceae
- Genus: Pluteus
- Species: P. pellitus

Binomial name
- Pluteus pellitus (Pers.) P.Kumm. (1871)

Synonyms
- Agaricus pellitus Pers. (1801); Gymnopus pellitus (Pers.) Zaw. (1835); Rhodosporus pellitus (Pers.) J.Schröt. (1889); Hyporrhodius pellitus (Pers.) Henn. (1898); Pluteus pellitus var. punctillifer Quél. (1885)

= Pluteus pellitus =

Species of fungus

Pluteus pellitus, the ghost shield, is a species of mushroom-forming fungus belonging to the family Pluteaceae. It is a wood-dwelling mushroom that decomposes dead plant material. It produces fruiting bodies with a cap and stipe; the cap is whitish but pale brown towards the centre. The species can be distinguished from Pluteus petasatus by its pleurocystidia (specialized cells on the gill sides) that bear 2–4 hooks at their tips, and by the presence of clamp connections on the hyphae of the cap surface. It is widespread but rare in Europe.
