= Pluteus brunneidiscus =

Scientific classification
- Domain: Eukaryota
- Kingdom: Fungi
- Division: Basidiomycota
- Class: Agaricomycetes
- Order: Agaricales
- Family: Pluteaceae
- Genus: Pluteus
- Species: P. brunneidiscus

Binomial name
- Pluteus brunneidiscus Murrill (1917)

Synonyms
- Pluteus washingtonensis Murrill (1917)

Species of fungus

Pluteus brunneidiscus is a species of agaric fungus in the family Pluteaceae. It was first described scientifically by American mycologist William Alphonso Murrill in 1917. It is found in Europe (Spain) and North America.

== Description ==
Pileus and stipe without blue-green tinges. Specimens are small to medium-sized and have a brown pileus which is usually darker at the center.

=== Habitat and distribution ===
Solitary, on wood of broad-leaved trees. Found in the U.S. and in Spain from June to November.

== Chemistry ==
These mushrooms contain psilocybin.

== See also ==
- List of Pluteus species
