= P. glaucus =

P. glaucus may refer to:

- Papilio glaucus, the Eastern tiger swallowtail, a butterfly species native to North America
- Phyllobius glaucus, a weevil species found across Europe
- Phyllocladus glaucus, now Phyllocladus aspleniifolius, the celery-top pine
- Pluteus glaucus, a medicinal mushroom
- Pseudomys glaucus, the blue-gray mouse

== See also ==
- Glaucus (disambiguation)
