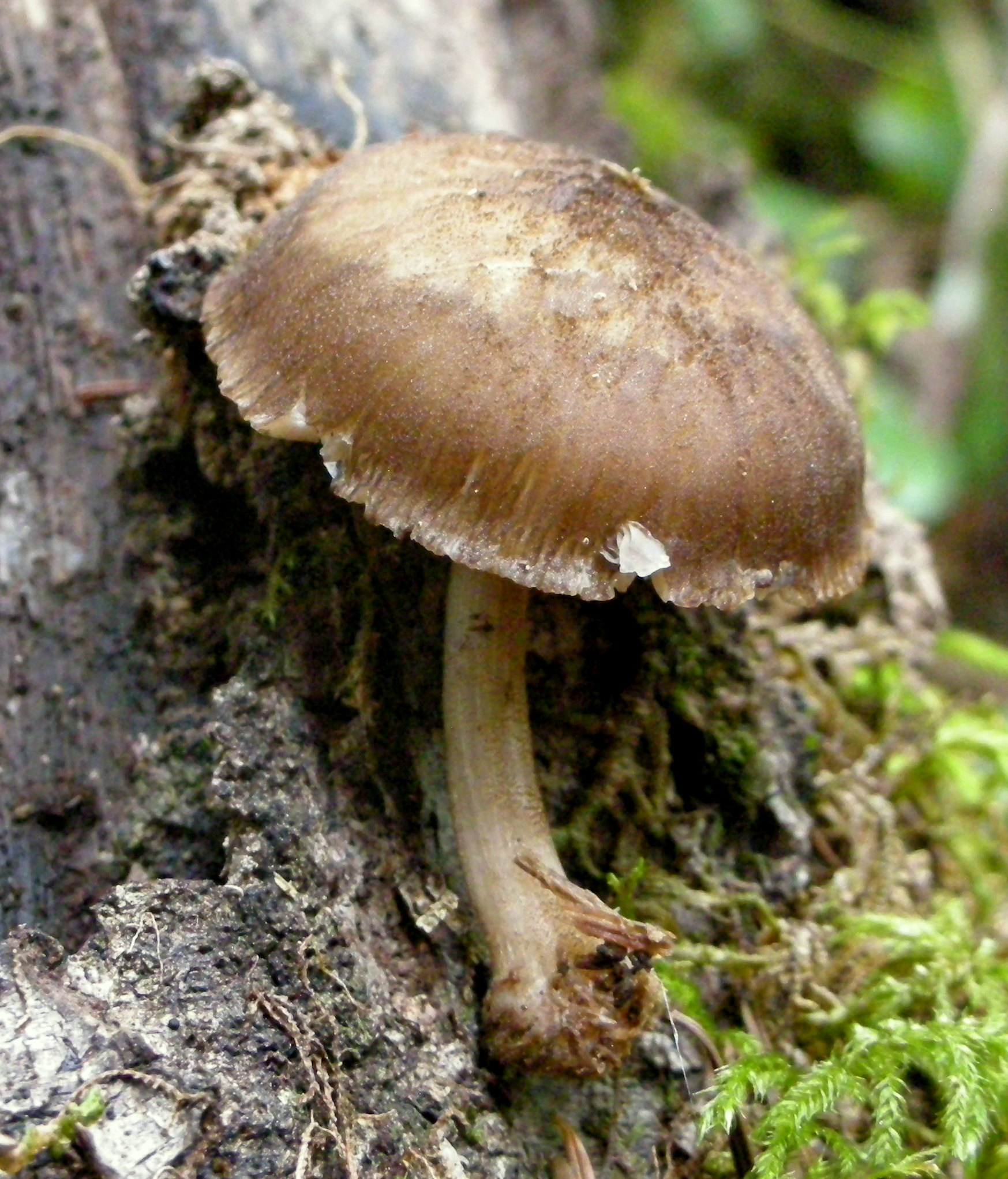

Scientific classification
- Kingdom: Fungi
- Division: Basidiomycota
- Class: Agaricomycetes
- Order: Agaricales
- Family: Pluteaceae
- Genus: Pluteus
- Species: P. plautus

Binomial name
- Pluteus plautus (Weinm.) Gillet

= Pluteus plautus =

Species of fungus

Pluteus plautus
- Mycological characteristics
- Gills on hymenium
- Cap is convex or flat
- Hymenium is free
- Stipe is bare
- Spore print is salmon
- Edibility is unknown

Pluteus plautus, commonly known as the flatfoot deer mushroom or satin shield, is a species of mushroom in the family Pluteaceae. It is found in the UK and the Pacific Northwest, though it is uncommon in the Pacific Northwest.

== Description ==
The cap of Pluteus plautus is brown to beige in color and about 3-7 centimeters in diameter. It starts out dome-shaped and becomes convex or flat as the mushroom matures. The gills are pinkish buff in color and free. The stipe is whitish in color and scaly on the lower half. It is fibrous and has a slightly bulbous base. It is about 2.5-3.5 centimeters long and 0.3-0.4 centimeters wide. The spore print is salmon pink, and pleurocystidia are present.

== Habitat and ecology ==
Pluteus plautus is found on wood. While it typically grows on hardwoods, it is occasionally also found on conifers.
