= Pluteus villosus =

Scientific classification
- Domain: Eukaryota
- Kingdom: Fungi
- Division: Basidiomycota
- Class: Agaricomycetes
- Order: Agaricales
- Family: Pluteaceae
- Genus: Pluteus
- Species: P. villosus

Binomial name
- Pluteus villosus Quél.

Species of fungus

Pluteus villosus is a medicinal mushroom in the Pluteaceae family.

== Chemistry ==
The mushroom contains psilocybin.

== See also ==
- List of Psilocybin mushrooms
