= Giovanni Battista Traverso =

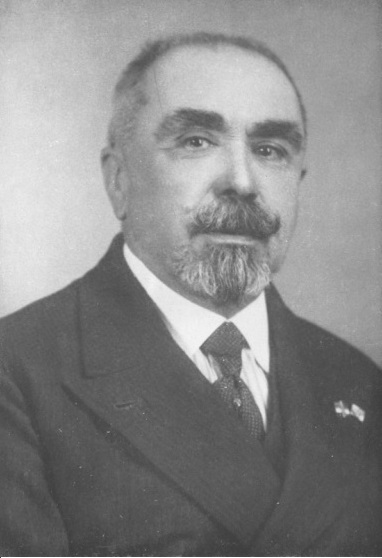
Giovanni Battista Traverso

Giovanni Battista Traverso (1878–1959) was a mycologist and plant pathologist in the early 20th century.

He was born in Pavia, Italy, on October 25, 1878, and died on January 22, 1955 (Baldacci, 1959). He was interested in the flora since his early years what could be seen on his prints that he gave to the catalog of the vascular plants of Pavia in 1898 (Flora urbica pavese) (Traverso, 1898; Stafleu, and Cowan, 1986).

Traverso completed his major in natural sciences at University of Pavia in July 1900. By that time he was also professor of botany and director of the Italian Cryptogamic Laboratory. His first advisor was Giovanni Briosi, who created a peaceful atmosphere of work at the University of Pavia where Traverso had the opportunity to publish his works with botany and mycology (Baldacci, 1959).

After his graduation he worked at the Agricultural Experimental Station in Modena, Italy, for a short period of time and moved to Padua, Italy, to work with Pier Andrea Saccardo, who was a botany professor (Baldacci, 1959). At that time they published some works together: Contributions to the mycology of Sardinia (“Contribuzione all flora micologica della Sardegna”) in 1903, and Arrangement and nomenclature of mycological groups in the ‘cryptogamic Italian flora’ (“Sulla disposizione e nomenclatura dei gruppi micologici da seguirsi nelle ‘Flora italica crytogama’”) in 1907.

In 1905 he obtained a degree of general botanist and worked until 1914 as Saccardo’s assistant at the University of Padua, where he started working with mycology and formed the Italian mycological school (Baldacci, 1959). Most of his published works are from these years. In 1913 Traverso edited the exsiccata Fungi Italici exsiccati (seu Mycothecae Italicae series altera).

In 1915 he got a job of vice-director at the Station of Plant Pathology in Rome, Italy. At the Station he had a chance to meet a great professor advisor, Giuseppe Cuboni, who was dedicated to the research new pathways of plant diseases (Baldacci, 1959).

The greatest of his works on plant pathology are dated from this period, which includes the studies on downy mildew of wheat (Sclerophthora macrospora), “ink disease” on chestnut trees caused by Phytophthora sp., certain bacterial diseases, as well as significant works of mycology (Baldacci, 1959), including 77 described species, and published works on the mycological classe of Sordariomycetes (or Pyrenomycetes), and on the families Xylariaceae, Valsaceae, and Ceratostomataceae.

Traverso, succeeding Luigi Meomartini, became a plant pathology professor at the Institute of Agriculture (“R. Istituto superiore di Agricoltura”) in Milan, Italy, by November 1923; nowadays, this school is named the Faculty of Agricultural and Food Sciences of Milan (“Facoltà di Scienze Agrarie”), the largest school of agriculture in Italy. He taught for 25 years and left the chair in 1948 (replaced by Elio Baldacci), but continued working as a Dean of the Faculty and then as a professor emeritus, spending the rest of his life in Milan (Baldacci, 1959). Between these years he identified 3 more species of fungi Aspergillus kitaii, Flammula carbonaria var. spegazziniana, and Oidium cyanescens, and conserved a herbarium with a mycological collection of more than 1500 species.

His works started the Cryptogamic Italian Flora, a series of books which describes and diagnoses fungi. Traverso compiled the first four books of the series, dedicating the first book to the Italian Bibliography of Mycology and the subsequent to the group of the Sordariomycetes (or Pyrenomycetes), of which he was one of the leading specialists from around the world. He became a follower on Saccardo's works publishing the volumes XIX and XX of the Sylloge Fungorum, an enormous and unique work published that was reprinted in USA in the 60's. In the same book, he had also collaboration on the volumes XVII, XXIII and XXIV (Baldacci, 1959). Showing his devotion, Traverso published on the new Italian botanic journal the commemorative papers of Saccardo and Cuboni, tracing their biography (Traverso, 1920).

When Traverso died Giacomo Bresadola, a mycologist from Trent, was the one who took care of the funeral and the posthumous publication of Traverso's works with basidiomycetes (Baldacci, 1959). Elio Baldacci was Traverso's successor, working as a professor at the Faculty of Agricultural and Food Sciences of Milan (Belli at al., 2007). Traverso was a great Italian who honored the country in the sciences and in particular in the field of mycology and plant pathology (Baldacci, 1959), his works were well recognized and are still used on the present days.

== Species identified ==
Some fungal species identified by Traverso
Ascochyta asclepiadearum (1903)
Aspergillus kitaii (1931)
Cercospora longissima (1903)
Cercosporella compacta (1904)
Colletotrichum montemartinii f. rohdeae (1903)
Dendrodochium nectriae (1902)
Diplodia microspora subsp. osmanthi (1903)
Exosporium meliloti (1912)
Guignardia quercus-ilicis (1907)
Leptosphaeria montana (1912)
Nectria tuberculata (1902)
Phoma araucariae (1900)
Phomopsis sidae (1915)
Phyllosticta sterculicola (1903)
Sclerospora graminicola var. setariae-italicae (1902)
Septoria montana (1903)
Uromyces cladomanes (1921)

== Notes ==
- “Note: Not to be confused with the Italian mineralogist and mining-engineer Giovanni Battista Traverso (1843-1914)” (Stafleu and Cowan, 1986).
- A list of Giovanni Battista Traverso's publications can be found at http://www.cybertruffle.org.uk/cgi-bin/bibquery.pl?author=traverso,%20g.b.
