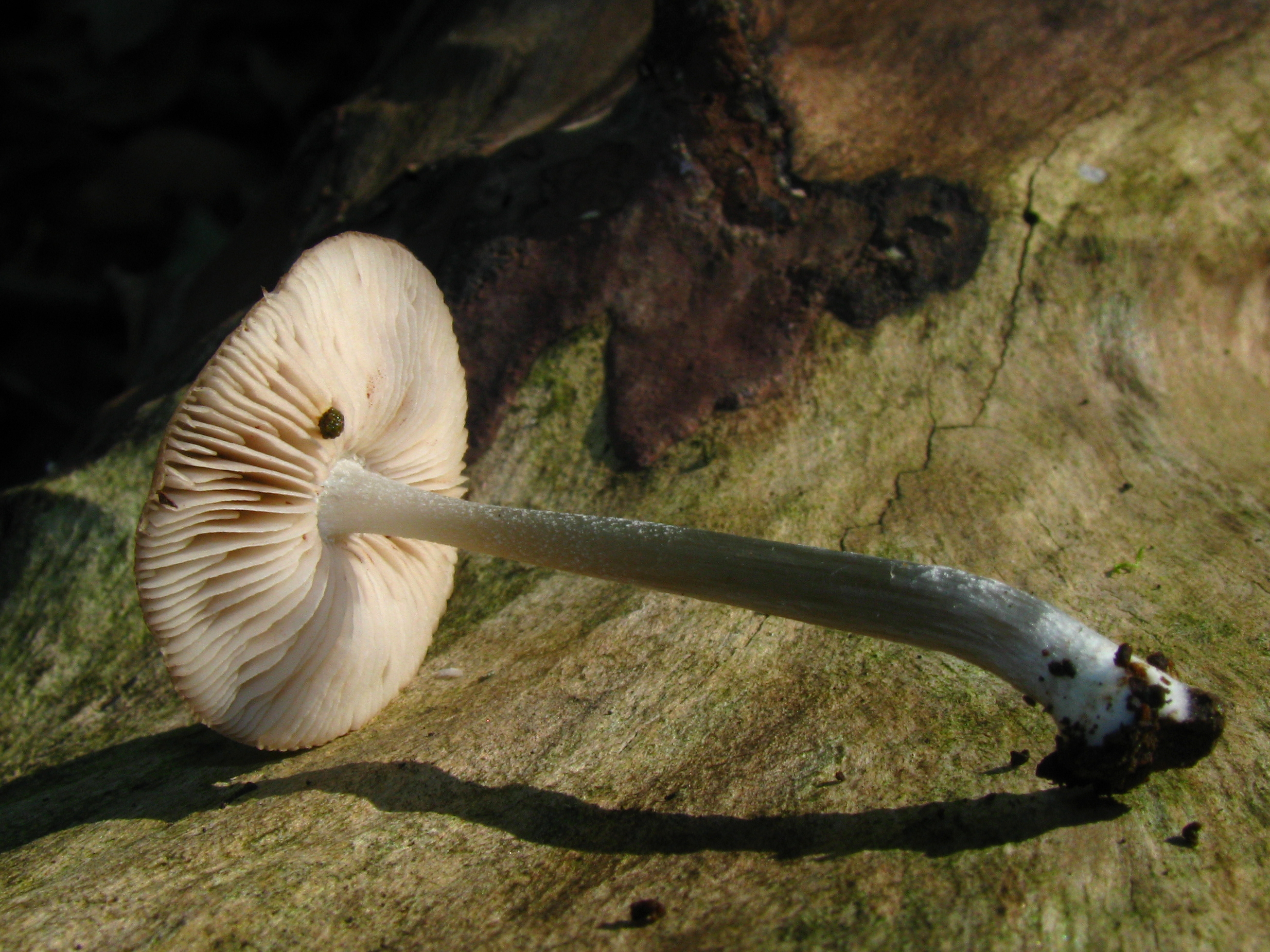

Scientific classification
- Domain: Eukaryota
- Kingdom: Fungi
- Division: Basidiomycota
- Class: Agaricomycetes
- Order: Agaricales
- Family: Pluteaceae
- Genus: Pluteus
- Species: P. cyanopus

Binomial name
- Pluteus cyanopus Quél. (1883)

Synonyms
- Pluteus chrysophaeus var. cyanopus (Quél.) Quél. (1888); Pluteus metrodii Malençon & Bertault (1970)

= Pluteus cyanopus =

Species of fungus

Pluteus cyanopus is a species of agaric fungus in the family Pluteaceae. Found in Africa, Europe, and North America, its fruit bodies contain the psychoactive compounds psilocybin and psilocin. The species was first described scientifically by French mycologist Lucien Quélet in 1883.

== See also ==
- List of Pluteus species
- List of Psilocybin mushrooms
