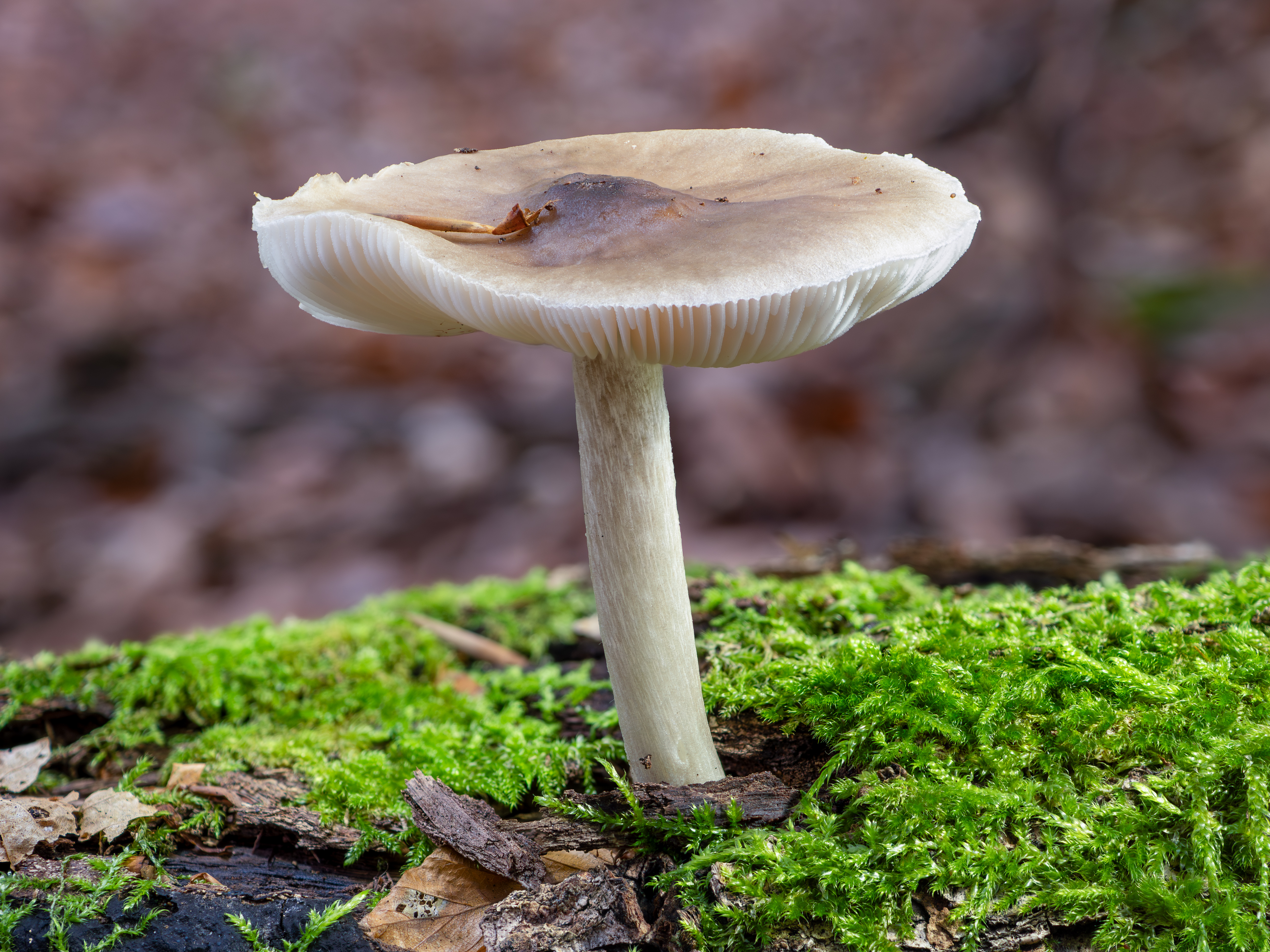

Conservation status
- Secure (NatureServe)

Scientific classification
- Kingdom: Fungi
- Division: Basidiomycota
- Class: Agaricomycetes
- Order: Agaricales
- Family: Pluteaceae
- Genus: Pluteus
- Species: P. cervinus

Binomial name
- Pluteus cervinus (Schaeff.) P. Kumm. (1871)

Synonyms
- Agaricus cervinus Schaeff. (1774); Rhodosporus cervinus (Schaeff.) J. Schröt. (1889); Pluteus atricapillus (Batsch) Fayod (1889)

= Pluteus cervinus =

Pluteus cervinus
- Mycological characteristics
- Gills on hymenium
- Cap is flat or umbonate
- Hymenium is free
- Stipe is bare
- Spore print is salmon to reddish-brown
- Ecology is saprotrophic
- Edibility is edible

Pluteus cervinus, commonly known as the deer shield, deer mushroom, or fawn mushroom, is a species of fungus in the order Agaricales. Fruit bodies are agaricoid (mushroom-shaped). Pluteus cervinus is saprotrophic and fruit bodies are found on rotten logs, roots, tree stumps, sawdust, and other wood waste. It is common in Europe and eastern North America.

== Etymology ==
The species epithet, cervinus, means "deer-like"" and refers to the colour of the cap (described as "rehfarbig" in Jacob Christian Schäffer's original 1774 description).

== Description ==
The cap typically grows up to 12 centimetres (4 3/4 in) in diameter. Initially it is bell-shaped and often wrinkled when young. Later it expands to a convex shape. The cap can be deer-brown, but varies from light ochre-brown to dark brown, with a variable admixture of grey or black. The centre of the cap may be darker. The cap surface is smooth and matt to silky-reflective. The cap skin shows dark radial fibres when seen through a lens, indicating that the microscopic cuticle structure is filamentous. The gills are initially white, but soon show a distinctive pinkish sheen, caused by the ripening spores.

The stipe is 5–12 cm long and 0.5–2 cm in diameter, usually thicker at the base. It is white and covered with brown vertical fibrils. The flesh is soft and white. The fruit body has a mild to earthy radish smell and a mild taste at first, which may become slightly bitter.

The spores are elliptical, smooth and measure approximately 7.0–8.0 × 5.0–5.5 μm. The hyphae lack clamp connections. The cystidia are thick-walled with apical projections. The spore print is pinkish brown.

=== Similar species ===
Similar species include Pluteus atromarginatus, which has a dark brown edge to the gills; P. rangifer, a subarctic species; P. elaphinus in eastern North America; P. hongoi which typically has a paler cap and occurs in Eurasia and eastern North America; and P. exilis which typically produces fruit bodies in spring and occurs in western North America. Similarly coloured species of Entoloma have gills that are attached to the stipe (not free) and distinctive, angular spores.

== Distribution and ecology ==
Pluteus cervinus is common in Europe (April to December) and eastern North America, but rare and possibly introduced in western North America. It grows on stumps and wood debris.

This mushroom has been recorded as food of the larvae of the pleasing fungus beetle Tritoma mimetica, and tentatively for the (possibly conspecific) relatives T.atriventris and T.humeralis too.

== Uses ==
Although a poor-quality edible mushroom with an unremarkable flavour (and not preserving well), young specimens can be added to other cooked dishes.

== Gallery ==
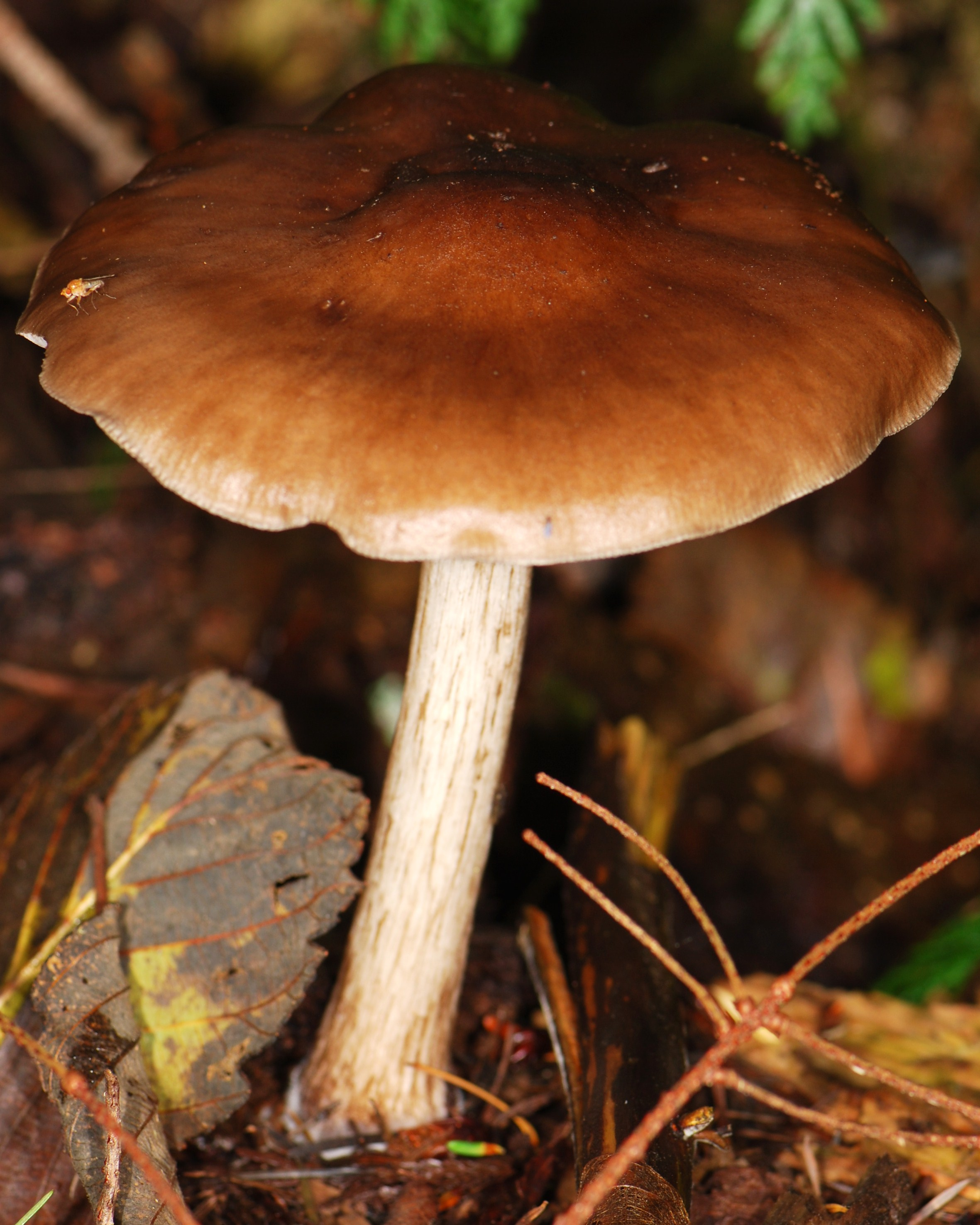
Mature Pluteus cervinus

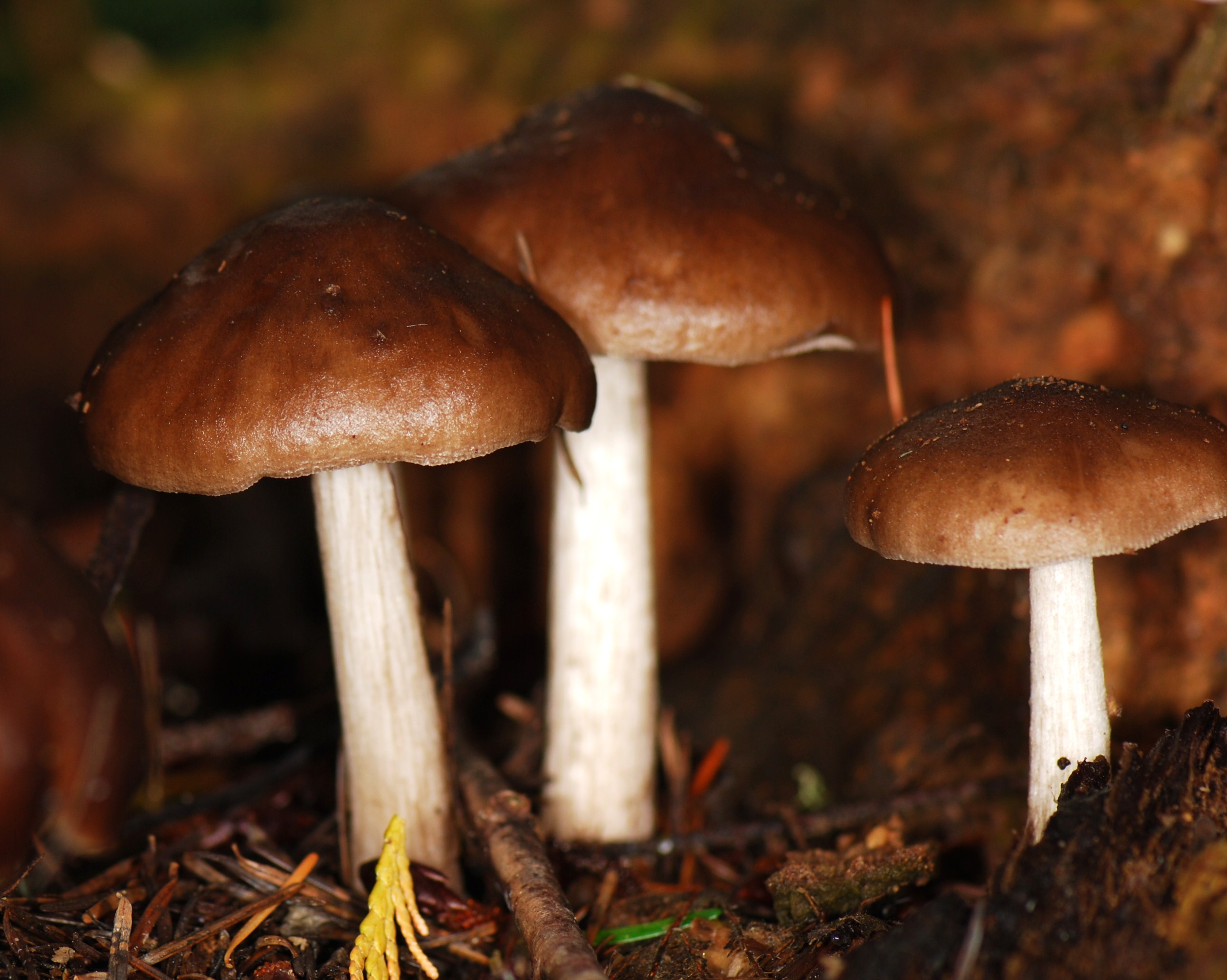
Young Pluteus cervinus

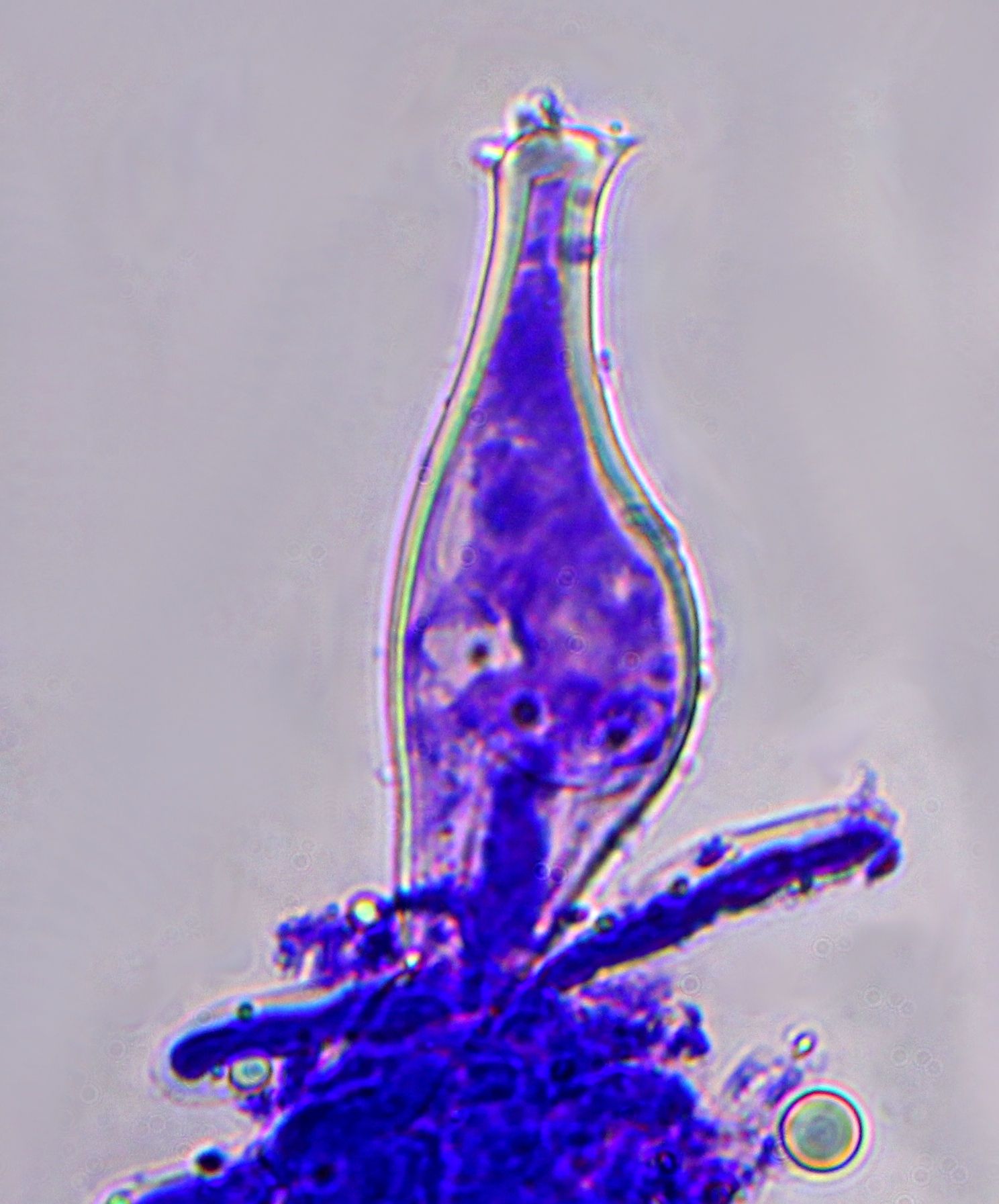
Cystidium with apical projections

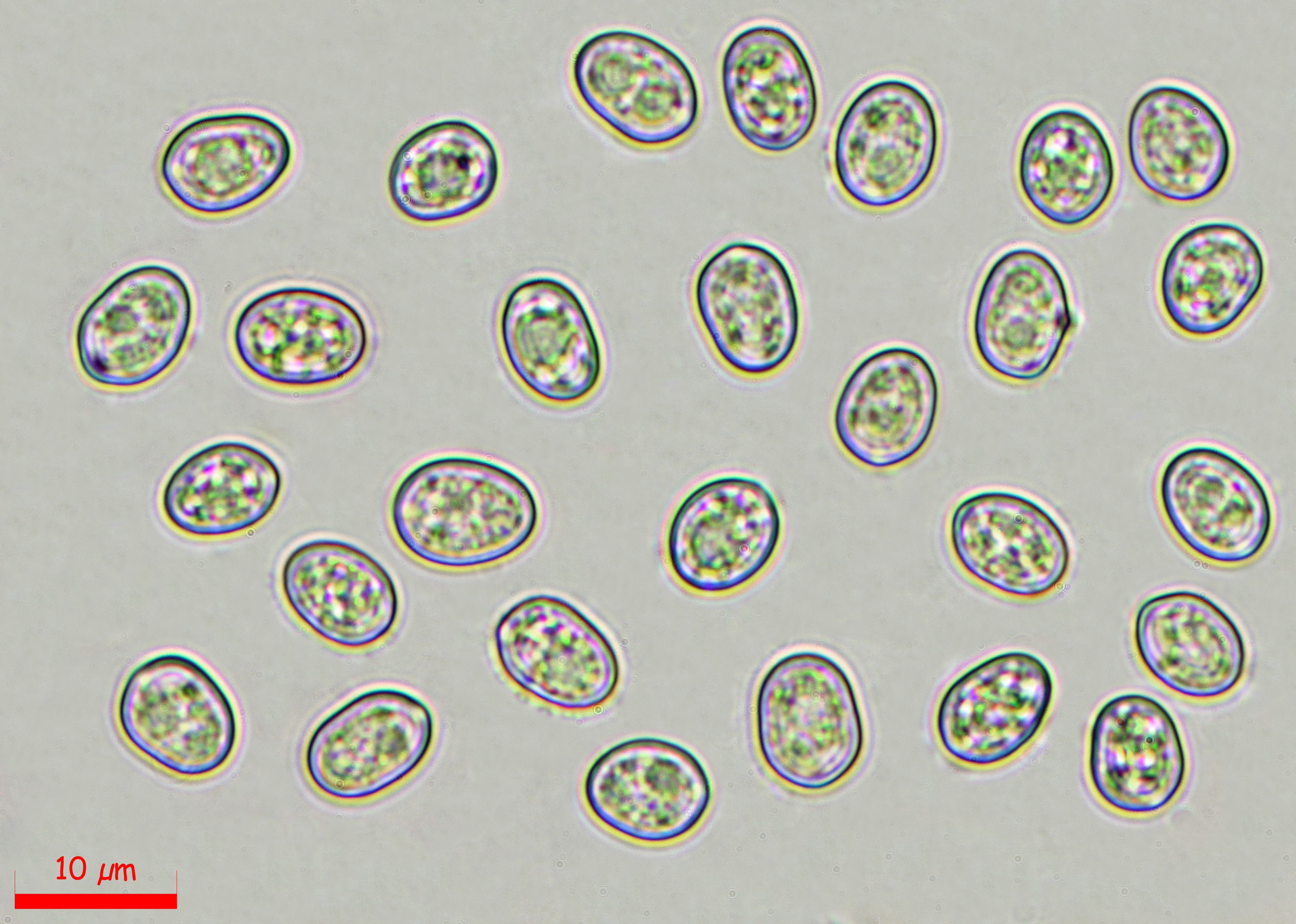
Basidiospores

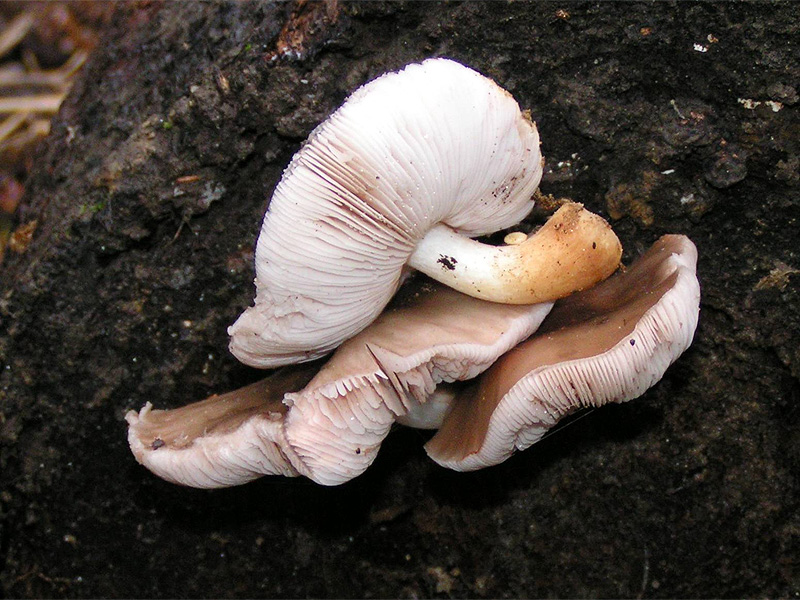
Pluteus cervinus

== See also ==
- List of Pluteus species
