= Nikolai Kuehner =

Russian historian (1877–1955)

- Born: 26 September 1877; Tbilisi, Russian Empire
- Died: 5 April 1955 (aged 77); Leningrad, Russian SFSR, Soviet Union
- Scientific career
- Fields: Oriental studies; ethnography; history

Nikolai Vasilyevich Kuehner (Russian: Николай Васильевич Кюнер; 26 September 1877 – 5 April 1955) was a Soviet and Russian orientalist, historian, and ethnographer.

== Biography ==
Kuehner was born into a family of a music teacher, his father was Wilhelm Friedrich (Vasily) Kuehner (died 1911), an ethnically German music teacher in the St. Petersburg Mariinsky Women's Institute, a composer and accompanist, of Lutheran confession. Kuehner's mother was Mary Kuzminichna Berezkina (died 1924) from a family of physicians, of Greek orthodox confession. From his youth, Kuehner took an interest in Eastern countries, culture and history of China, Japan, Tibet.

After graduating from the Tiflis Gymnasium in 1896, Kuehner enrolled in the Sino-Manchurian-Mongolian of the Oriental Languages department in the Saint Petersburg University. After graduation (1900, with a gold medal) Kuehner was retained in the university to prepare for a professorship, and received a two-year assignment to China and Japan. Kuehner learned seven Oriental (including Chinese, Tibetan, Mongolian, Manchu, Korean, Japanese) and 10 European languages. Upon return, Kuehner was appointed in 1902 to the newly established Oriental Institute in Vladivostok, later transformed into a Far Eastern State University.

In Vladivostok, Kuehner created his best works, and received recognition of the scientific community. In 1909, 1912, and 1915 Kuehner traveled to China, Korea and Japan to improve his linguistic skills. In Vladivostok, Kuehner prepared his master's thesis "Geographical Description of Tibet" (1907–08), which became a major contribution to the national Orientalism, still retaining its value as one of the key fundamental work in the field of the history, geography, and ethnography of Tibet. In the Oriental Institute Kuehner developed and read a course on history, geography, and ethnography of the Far East. After the 1917 fall of Czardom, Kühner decided to remain in Vladivostok, even though a majority of the professors left to the European part of the country or fled abroad. Kuehner was one of the first Russian sinologists who began working on a new history of China, authoring the work "Essays on the recent political history of China" (Khabarovsk, Vladivostok, 1927). Kuehner collected extensive material on the history and culture of China, Korea and Japan. In the autumn of 1925, Kühner moved to Leningrad, where was a professor at the Oriental Faculty of the Leningrad State University. From 1932, he also became a senior fellow and a head of the Eastern and Southeastern Asia section at the Academy of Sciences of the Soviet Union Ethnography Institute. Kuehner was also teaching at the Leningrad Oriental Institute, reading courses on the history, ethnography, geography, and history of material culture of the Far East.

During the 1942–45 war years, Kuehner evacuated to Kazakhstan, where he worked as a senior fellow in the Kazakhstan Central Historical Archive and in the Alma-Ata State Public Library.

Kuehner is an author of more than 300 scientific papers. His first major work was "Geographical sketch of Japan" (1903). In his more than fifty years he authored a monograph "Bibliography of Chinese literature on the peoples of the North, Amur, Siberia, Mongolia and Central Asia", "Bibliography of Tibet", "Bibliography of Mongolia", "Bibliography of Korea". In 1950–53 Kuehner actively participated in the re-publication of the Nikita Bichurin's "Collection of information about peoples in Central Asia in ancient times". The work of Kuehner "Chinese news about peoples of Southern Siberia, Central Asia and the Far East" (Moscow, 1961) not only complements information contained in the Nikita Bichurin's work, but also greatly expanded the range of Chinese sources on that subject. Many of the Kuehner manuscripts remain unpublished, including "Feudal culture of Korea", "Korea in the second half of the eighteenth century", "Essay on economic geography of China", "Historical and geographical sketch of Japan", they are stored for scientific reference in the archives of the Russian Academy of Sciences Anthropology and Ethnography Museum. Kuehner received numerous state awards.

== Major works ==
- Geographical Description of Tibet, Vladivostok, 1907–1908
- Geography of China, Moscow, 1926
- Geography of Japan, Moscow, 1927
- Historical Review of the foundations of Chinese material and spiritual culture, in connection with the elucidation of the role of the latter in the lives of other Far Eastern peoples, Vladivostok, 1909
- Lectures on the History and Geography of Siberia, Vladivostok, 1919.
- Chinese news about peoples of Southern Siberia, Central Asia and Far East, Moscow, 1961
- Archive of MAE, fund No 8.
