= Pluteus glaucus =

Scientific classification
- Kingdom: Fungi
- Division: Basidiomycota
- Class: Agaricomycetes
- Order: Agaricales
- Family: Pluteaceae
- Genus: Pluteus
- Species: P. glaucus

Binomial name
- Pluteus glaucus Singer (1962)

Species of mushroom

Pluteus glaucus is a mushroom in the family Pluteaceae.

== Chemistry ==
0.28% psilocybin, 0.12% psilocin (Stijve and de Meijer 1993).

== See also ==
- List of Pluteus species
- List of Psilocybin mushrooms
