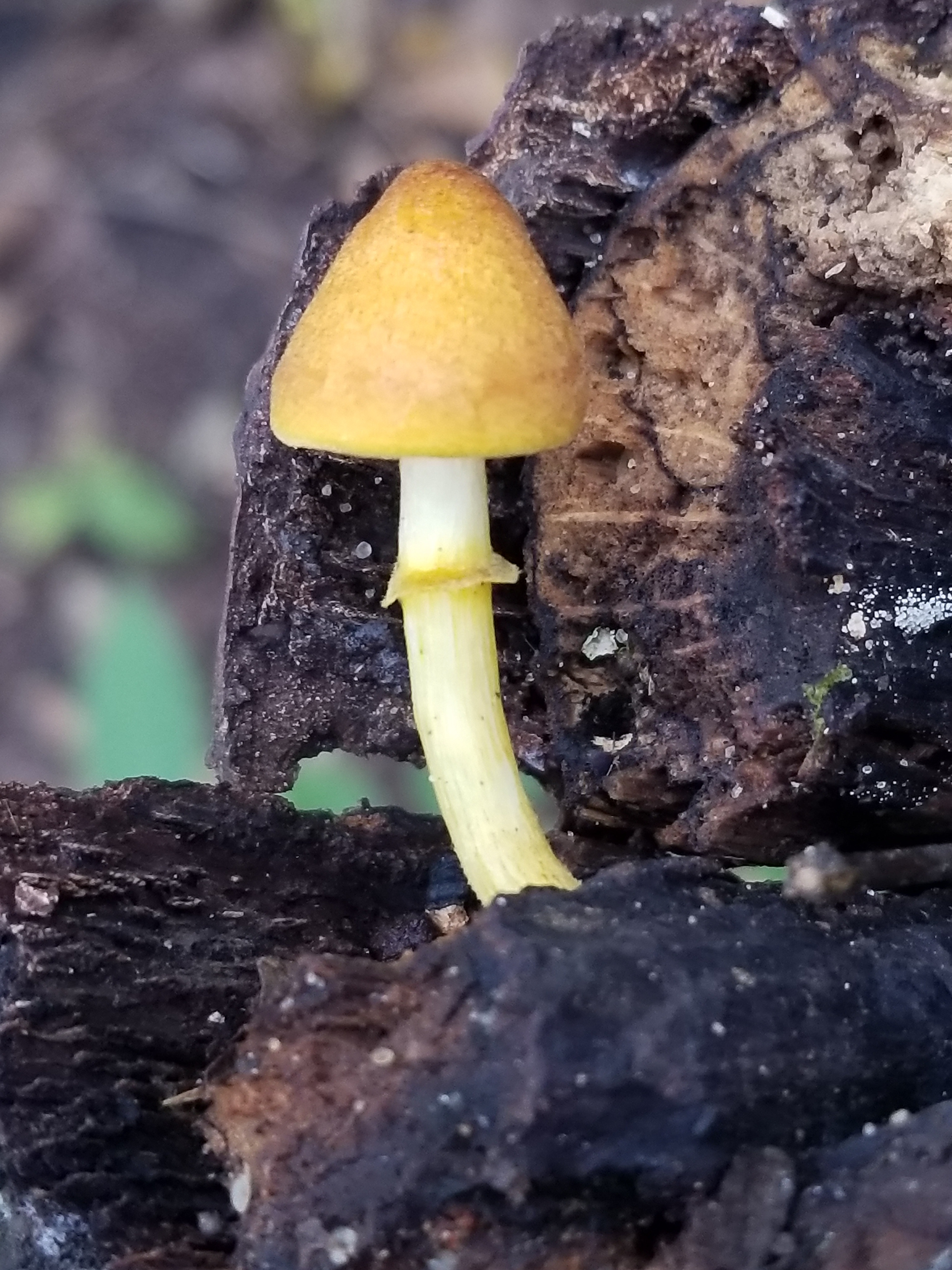

Scientific classification
- Domain: Eukaryota
- Kingdom: Fungi
- Division: Basidiomycota
- Class: Agaricomycetes
- Order: Agaricales
- Family: Pluteaceae
- Genus: Chamaeota (W.G.Sm.) Earle (1909)

Type species
- Chamaeota xanthogramma (Ces.) Earle (1909)

Species
- See text

= Chamaeota =

Genus of fungi

Chamaeota is a genus in the Pluteaceae family of small- to medium-sized mushrooms. They have a central stipe, free gills, smooth pink spores, and a partial veil that usually forms an annulus (ring) on the stipe. Chamaeota can be distinguished from Volvariella by its lack of a volva and from Entolomataceae by its free gills and smooth spores.

Members of Chamaeota are extremely rare. Most species are tropical but at least two species exist in the United States.

The type species is Chamaeota xanthogramma (Ces.) Earle [as 'xanthogrammus'] (1909).

== Notable species ==
- Chamaeota broadwayi Murrill (1911)
- Chamaeota dextrinoidespora Z.S. Bi (1988)
- Chamaeota fenzlii (Schulzer) Singer (1979) (eq Pluteus fenzlii)
- Chamaeota insignis (Cooke & Massee) Pegler (1965)
- Chamaeota longipes Wichanský (1967)
- Chamaeota sinica J.Z. Ying (1995)
- Chamaeota sphaerospora (eq Pluteus mammillatus)
- Chamaeota subolivascens Courtec. (1991)
- Chamaeota tropica Pegler (1983)
- Chamaeota xanthogramma (Ces.) Earle (1909)
