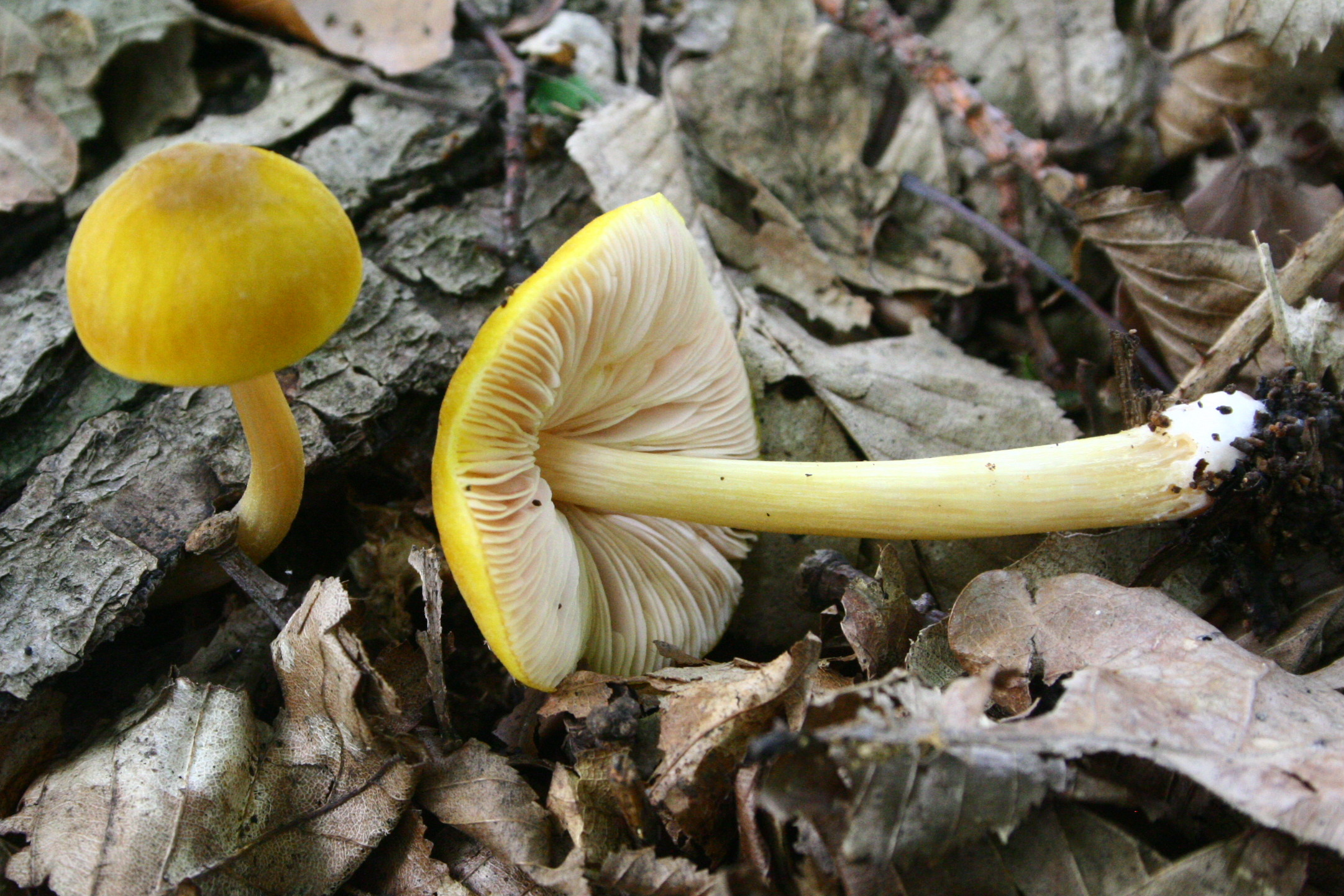

Scientific classification
- Kingdom: Fungi
- Division: Basidiomycota
- Class: Agaricomycetes
- Order: Agaricales
- Family: Pluteaceae
- Genus: Pluteus
- Species: P. leoninus

Binomial name
- Pluteus leoninus (Schäffer:Fr) P. Kumm. (1871)

Synonyms
- Pluteus fayodii

= Pluteus leoninus =

Pluteus leoninus
- Mycological characteristics
- Gills on hymenium
- Cap is convex
- Hymenium is free
- Stipe is bare
- Spore print is salmon
- Ecology is saprotrophic
- Edibility is edible

Pluteus leoninus, commonly known as the lion pluteus or lion shield, can occasionally be found growing on dead wood in Europe and North Africa. The underside of the cap is typical of the genus Pluteus — the gills are pale, soon becoming pink when the spores ripen. But the upper surface is a bright tawny or olivaceous yellow. The species name leoninus (meaning leonine) refers to this cap colour.

== Description ==
This description is combined from several references.

- The golden to olive-yellow convex cap is 3–7 cm in diameter, is hygrophanous, and usually has a grooved edge. The darker central disc has a slight velvety tomentum.
- The gills are yellowish at first, then salmon pink (the colour of the spore powder).
- The stipe is up to about 7 cm, often striate, being white to cream, and often darker near the base.
- The mushroom grows on stumps and wood debris of broad-leaved trees and sometimes of conifers.
- At the microscopic level, the filamentous cap cuticle is a trichoderm. The gills have scanty bladder-shaped pleurocystidia, and abundant fusiform cheilocystidia. The spores are smooth, almost globular, approximately 7×6 μm.

Many authorities consider Pluteus fayodii to be a synonym of P. leoninus, but according to Species Fungorum, they are distinct.

== Edibility ==
According to some sources, it is edible but has little to no taste.

== See also ==
- List of Pluteus species
