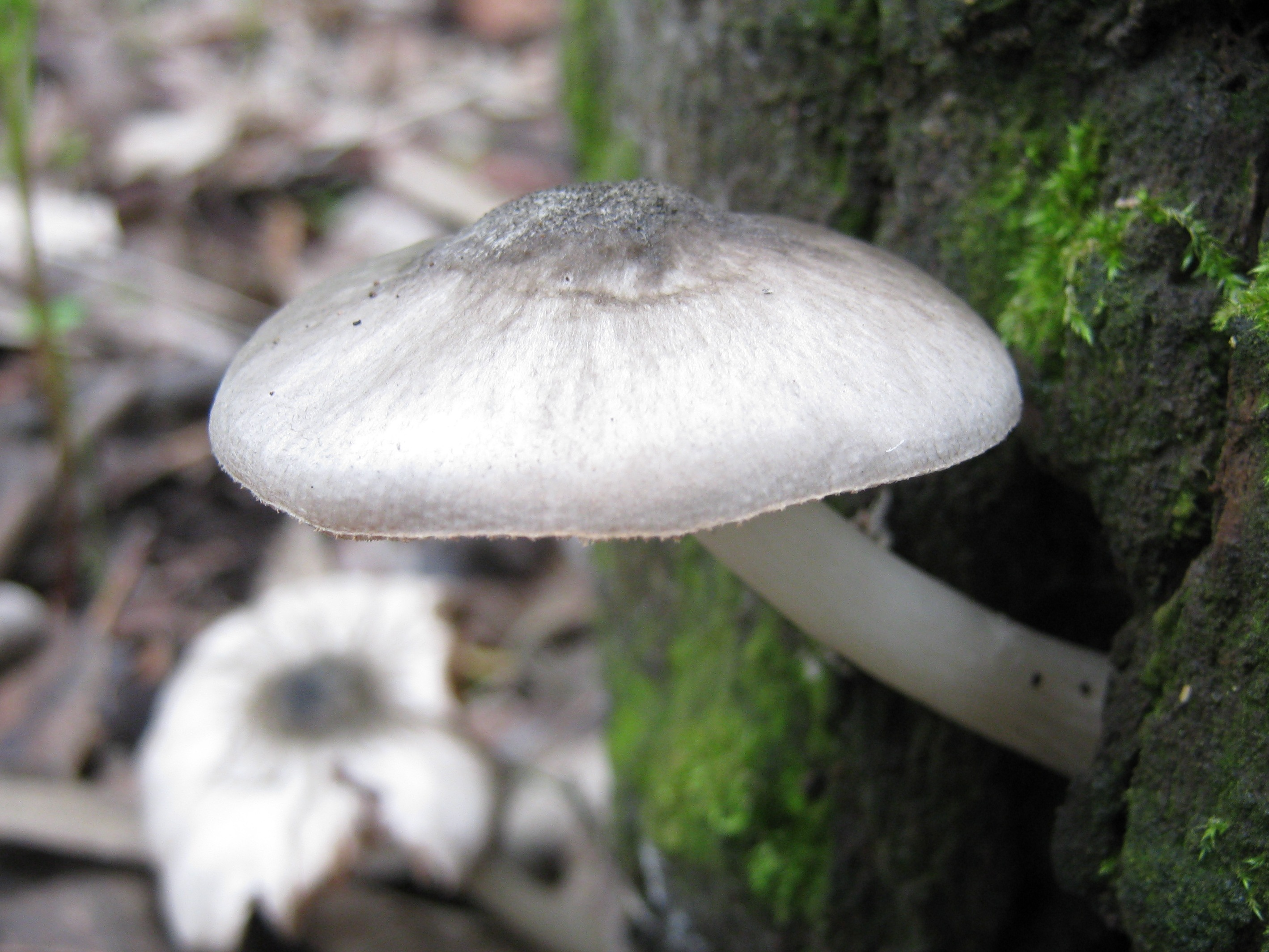

Scientific classification
- Domain: Eukaryota
- Kingdom: Fungi
- Division: Basidiomycota
- Class: Agaricomycetes
- Order: Agaricales
- Family: Pluteaceae
- Genus: Pluteus
- Species: P. salicinus

Binomial name
- Pluteus salicinus (Pers.) P.Kumm. (1871)

Synonyms
- Agaricus salicinus Pers. (1798); Rhodosporus salicinus (Pers.) J.Schröt. (1889)

= Pluteus salicinus =

Pluteus salicinus Mycological characteristics
- Gills on hymenium
- Cap is convex or flat
- Hymenium is free
- Stipe is bare
- Spore print is pink
- Ecology is saprotrophic
- Edibility is psychoactive or edible

Pluteus salicinus is a European psychedelic mushroom that grows on wood. It is an edible mushroom after parboiling.

== Taxonomy ==
The species was originally described by Christian Hendrik Persoon as Agaricus salicinus in 1798. Paul Kummer transferred it to the genus Pluteus in 1871.

== Description ==
- Cap: 2 — 5(8) cm in diameter, convex becoming broadly convex to plane, silver-gray to brownish-gray, often with blue or greenish tint in age, smooth, with tiny scales near the center, darker at the margin, slightly translucent-striate when moist, unlined cap margin, flesh white with a grayish tinge, thin to moderate. Cap skin fibrous.
- Gills: Crowded, broad, free, at first white, becoming pink-flesh colored; ventricose. Edges discoloring or bruising grayish.
- Stipe: 3 — 5(10) long, 0.2 — 0.6 cm thick, more or less equal or slightly swollen at the base, flesh white with grayish-green to bluish-green tones, especially near the base. Ring absent. Firm, full or stuffed.
- Taste: Unpleasant, indefinite or somewhat raphanoid (like radish).
- Odor: Unpleasant, indefinite or somewhat raphanoid.
- Spores: pink, smooth, 7 — 8.5 x 5 - 6 μm. Spore print pink-flesh colored to brown-pink.
- Microscopic features: Pleurocystidia fusiform with slightly thickened walls 50 — 70 x 11 — 18 μm; with 3 — 5 horn-like projections.

== Habitat and distribution ==
This mushroom is widely distributed across western Europe and Siberia. It is found on hardwoods - Alnus, Eucalyptus, Fagus, Populus and Quercus.

It is always found growing on wood. Summer-fall, solitary or gregarious on dead wood of hardwoods, in damp forests on flood-plains.

== Common name ==
The 'knackers crumpet' is a localised, common name referring to Pluteus salicinus. Its use is most prominent in the North of England.

== Chemistry ==
The concentration of psilocybin and psilocin in the dried sample of P. salicinus has been reported in the range of 0.21-0.35 and 0.011-0.05%, respectively.

== See also ==
- List of Pluteus species
- List of Psilocybin mushrooms
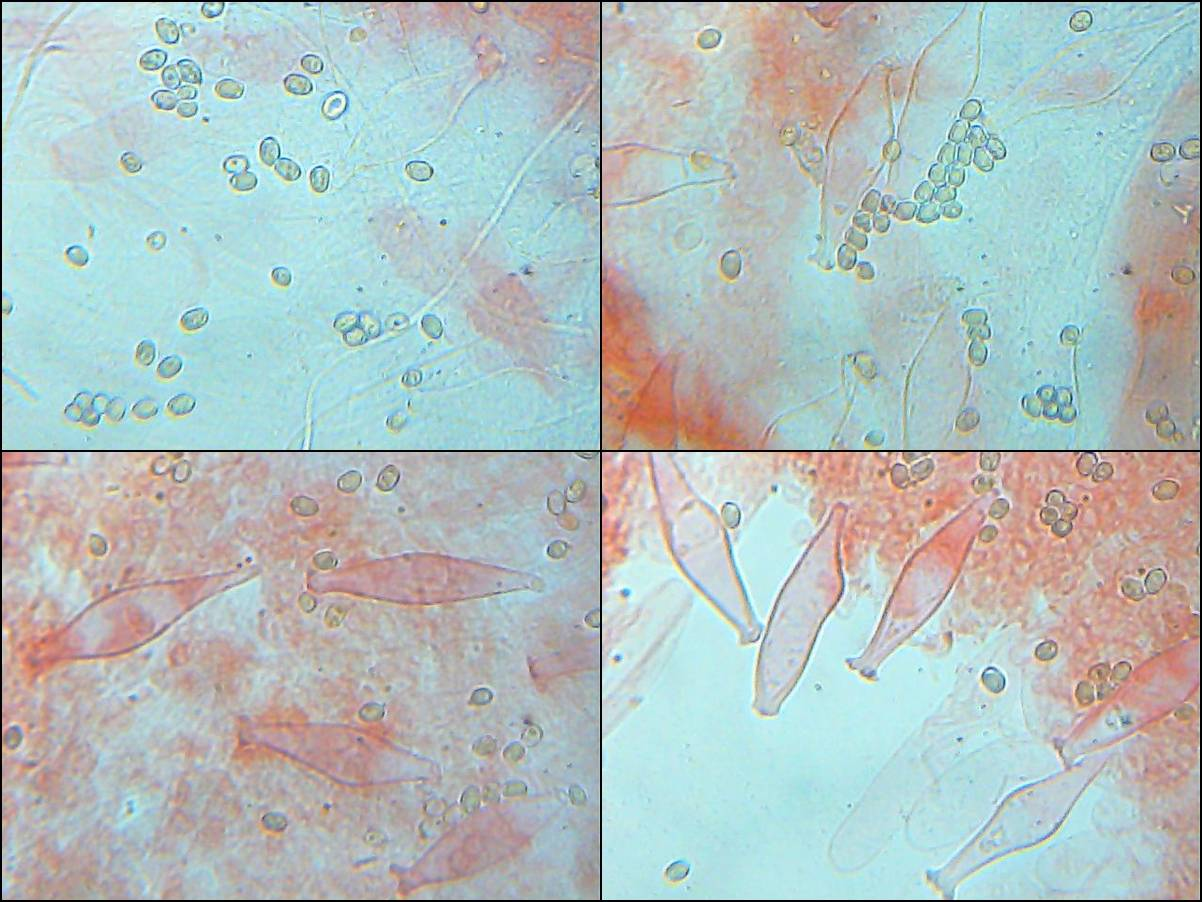
Pluteus salicinus microscopic features.
