= Giuseppe Cuboni =

Italian biologist and agronomist (1852–1920)

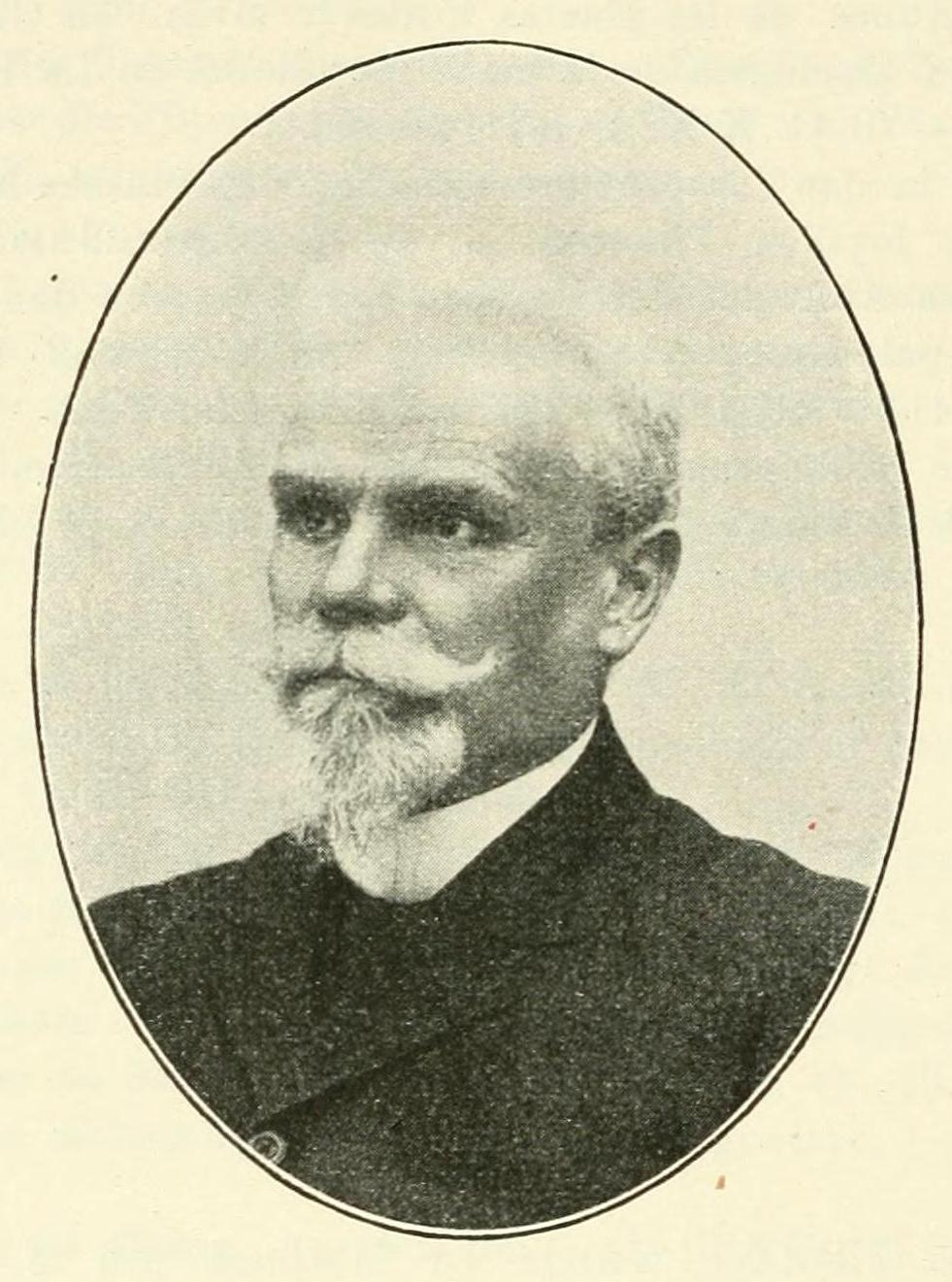
Giuseppe Cuboni

Giuseppe Cuboni (2 February 1852 in Modena – 3 November 1920 in Rome) was an Italian botanist and agronomist, known for his pioneer work in the field of plant pathology.

He studied medicine and natural sciences in Rome, where botanist Giuseppe De Notaris was an important influence to his career. From 1877 he spent four years working at the Botanical Garden of Rome, followed by a professorship at the School of Viticulture in Conegliano. Here he served as a professor of natural sciences (1881–85), then that of botany and plant pathology (1886–87). From 1887 to 1920 he was director of the Stazione di Patologia vegetale (Station for Plant Pathology) in Rome.

He is remembered for his research of plant diseases and their associated remedies. making significant contributions in his investigations of downy mildew and phylloxera, two scourges of grape vineyards. He also distinguished himself in his studies on the agriculture of southern Italy, finding species and varieties of agricultural plants that were adaptable to the special climatic conditions of the region.

The mycological genus Cubonia was named after him by Pier Andrea Saccardo.

== Associated works ==
- Synopsis mycologiae Venetae secundum matrices, 1886 (with Vincenzo Mancini).
- La peronospora dei grappoli. Studî di patologia vegetale, 1887 – Peronospora of grapes; a study of plant pathology.
- Le peronospora des grappes, 1889 (French translation by A. Picaud).
- Studi sul marciume delle radici nelle viti fillosserate, 1907 – Studies on root rot in vines caused by phylloxera.
- Giuseppe Cuboni (1852-1920): cenno bio-bibliografico, 1921 (biography by Giovanni Battista Traverso).
