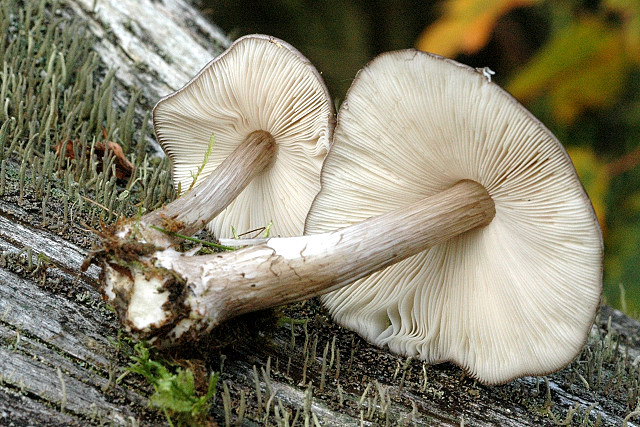
- Pluteus cervinus

Scientific classification
- Kingdom: Fungi
- Division: Basidiomycota
- Class: Agaricomycetes
- Order: Agaricales
- Family: Pluteaceae
- Genus: Pluteus; Fr.

Type species
- Pluteus cervinus (Schaeff.) P.Kumm.

Species
- Pluteus brunneidiscus Pluteus cervinus Pluteus cyanopus Pluteus glaucus Pluteus leoninus Pluteus nevadensis Pluteus nigroviridis Pluteus readiarum Pluteus salicinus Pluteus villosus Pluteus americanus

= Pluteus =

Genus of fungi

Pluteus
- Mycological characteristics
- Gills on hymenium
- Cap is flat or convex
- Hymenium is free
- Stipe is bare
- Spore print is pink
- Ecology is saprotrophic
- Edibility is edible or psychoactive

Pluteus is a large genus of fungi with over 300 species. They are wood rotting saprobes with pink spore prints and gills that are free from the stem.

The Latin word Pluteus means shed or penthouse.

== Characteristics of the genus ==
Characteristics of the Pluteus genus are:

1. These fungi grow on wood or wood remains.
2. The spore powder is deep pink, soon giving a pink tint to the initially pale gills.
3. The gills are free from the stipe.
4. There is no volva or ring (exception: the rare recently reclassified North American species P. mammillatus, previously Chamaeota sphaerospora).
5. Microscopically, they often have abundant, distinctive cystidia. The spores are smooth and roughly egg-shaped.

Pluteus is separated from Volvariella due to the lack of a volva, and from Entoloma by growing on wood and by microscopic features (Entolomas have angular spores).

== Naming ==
The name Pluteus was established in 1837 by the founding mycologist Elias Magnus Fries at a time when agaric mushrooms were first being assigned to different genera.

The Latin word "pluteus" has various meanings related to military protective structures and its signification here may be that of a shield (the shape of the cap).

== Remarks on particular species ==
Some of these mushrooms are edible including P. petasatus and P. cervinus, though most people rate their taste and consistency as average at best.

Pluteus cervinus is the best known species in Europe and North America.

Several species of this genus bruise blue and contain psilocybin including Pluteus brunneidiscus, Pluteus salicinus, Pluteus cyanopus, Pluteus glaucus, Pluteus nigroviridis, Pluteus phaeocyanopus, Pluteus americanus and Pluteus villosus.

Fungi of this genus have been recorded as food of the pleasing fungus beetles Dacne quadrimaculata and the (possibly conspecific) Tritoma atriventris and T.humeralis; while the former eats it only occasionally and probably just as adults, for the Tritoma a diet of Pluteus is apparently also a suitable larval food, and the species in question has been tentatively identified as the deer mushroom P.cervinus.

== See also ==
- List of Pluteus species
