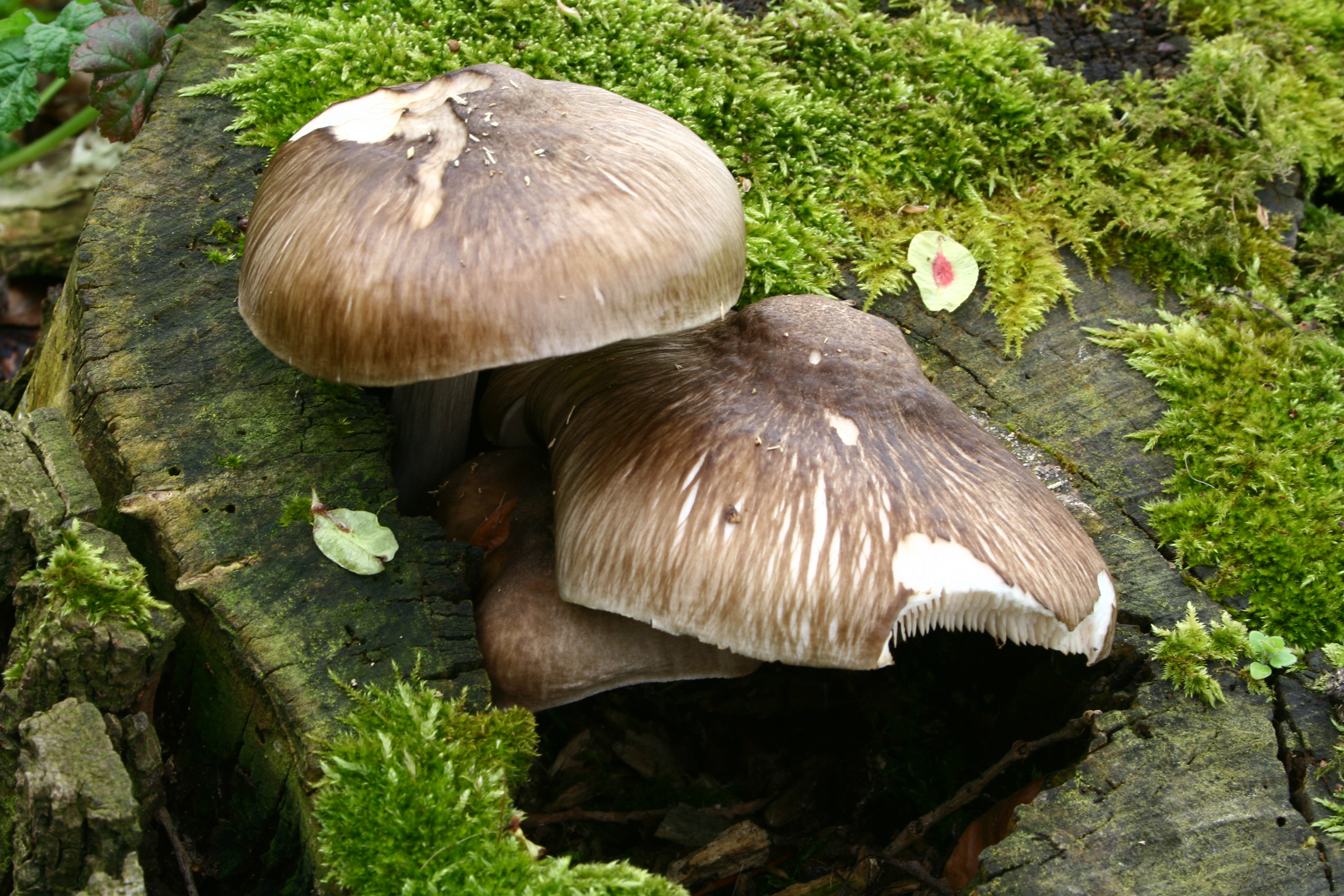
- Pluteus cervinus

Scientific classification
- Kingdom: Fungi
- Division: Basidiomycota
- Class: Agaricomycetes
- Order: Agaricales
- Family: Pluteaceae; Kotl. & Pouzar (1972)

Type genus
- Pluteus Fr. (1836)

Genera
- Chamaeota; Melanoleuca(?); Pluteus; Volvariella; Volvopluteus

= Pluteaceae =

Family of fungi

The Pluteaceae are a family of small to medium-sized mushrooms which have free gill attachment and pink spores. Members of Pluteaceae can be mistaken for members of Entolomataceae, but can be distinguished by the angled spores and attached gills of the Entolomataceae. The four genera in the Pluteaceae comprise the widely distributed Volvariella and Pluteus, the rare Chamaeota, and Volvopluteus, which was newly described in 2011 as a result of molecular analysis. The Dictionary of the Fungi (10th edition, 2008) estimates there are 364 species in the family.

== Selected species ==
- Pluteus cervinus, synonym Pluteus atricapillus, or deer mushroom
- Pluteus concentricus
- Pluteus leoninus
- Pluteus murinus
- Pluteus salicinus, or the knackers crumpet (hallucinogenic)
- Volvariella volvacea
- Volvopluteus gloiocephalus

== See also ==
- List of Agaricales families
