= List of Conocybe species =

This is a list of species in the agaric genus Conocybe. Many species may have synonyms with species in the Pholiotina genus due to changes in classifications over the years.

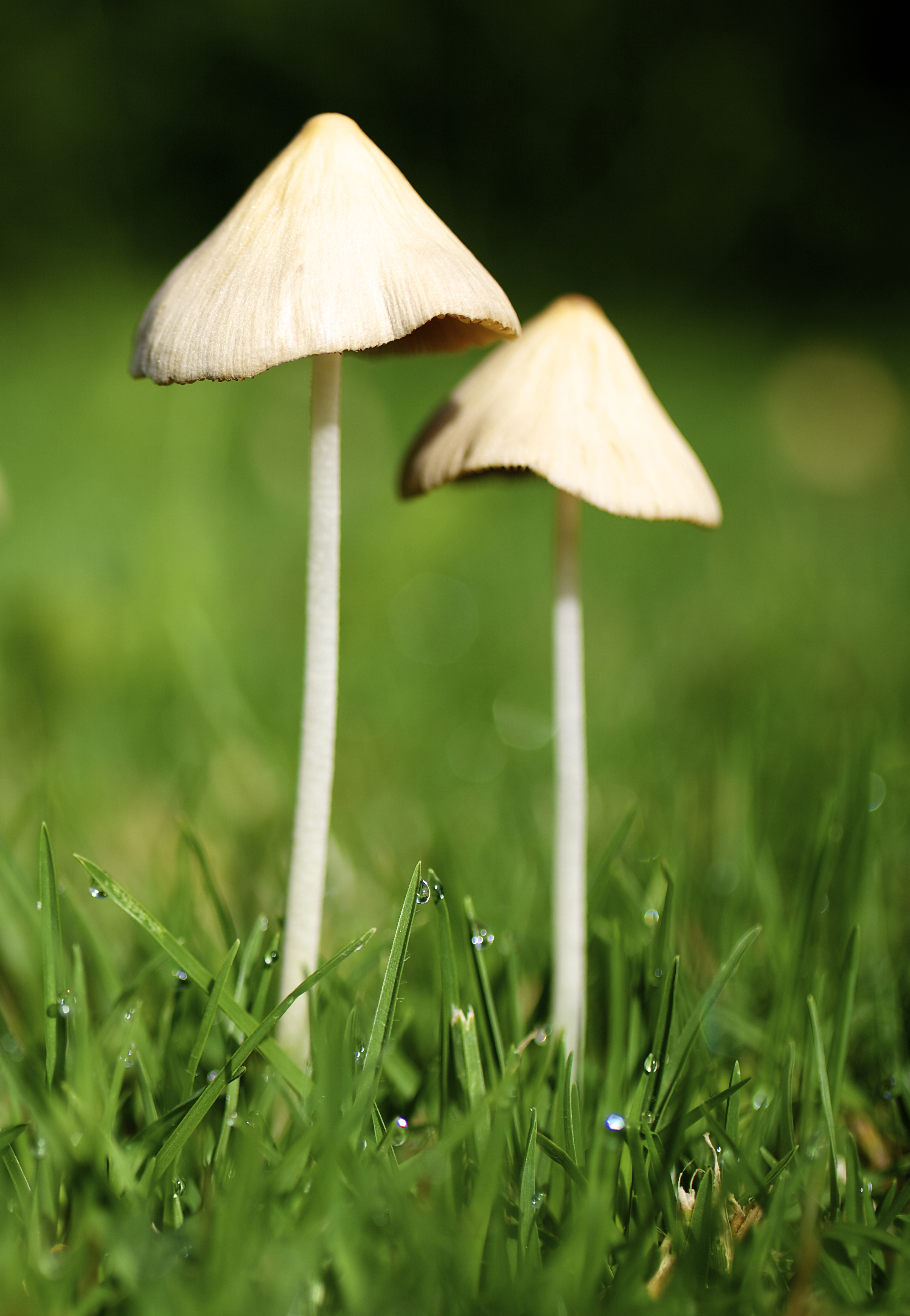
Conocybe apala

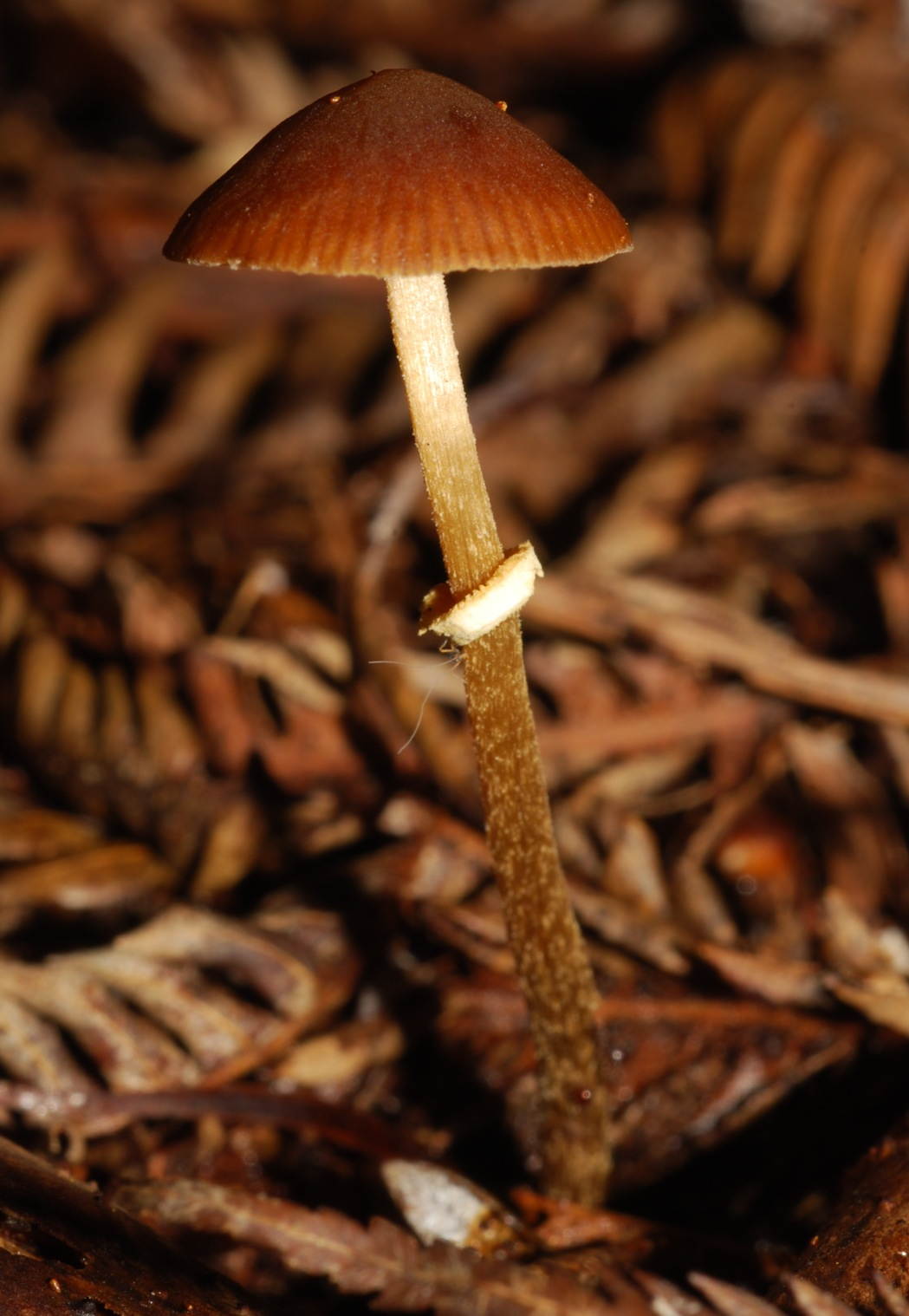
Conocybe rugosa

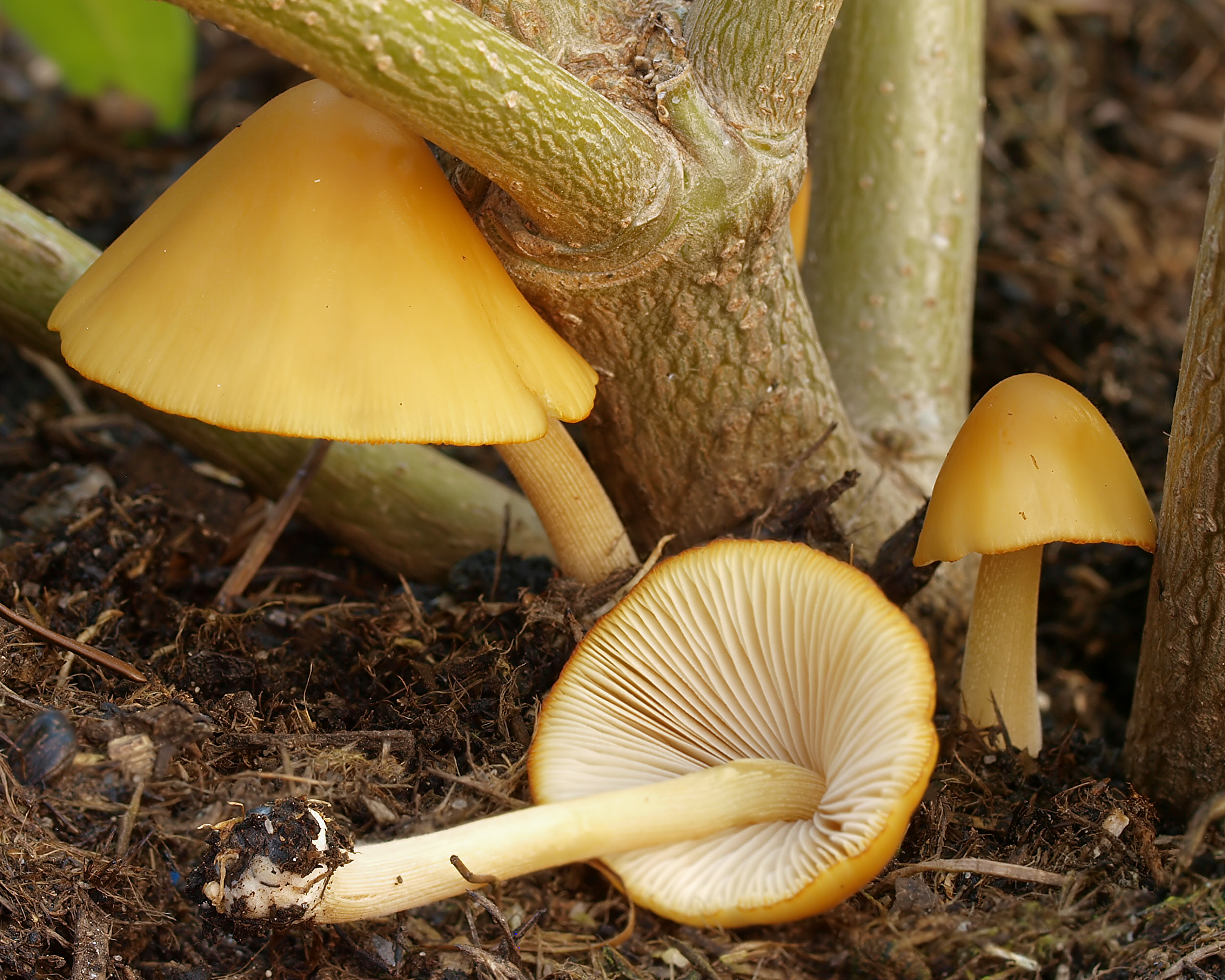
Conocybe aurea

== Species ==
As of August 2022, Species Fungorum accepted 268 species of Conocybe. The majority of these species are not well known and not often recorded.

1. Conocybe aberrans
2. Conocybe abjecta
3. Conocybe acutoconica
4. Conocybe aeruginosa
5. Conocybe affinis
6. Conocybe africana
7. Conocybe alachuana
8. Conocybe alba
9. Conocybe alboradicans
10. Conocybe alkovii
11. Conocybe altaica
12. Conocybe amazonica
13. Conocybe ambigua
14. Conocybe ammophila
15. Conocybe anthracophila
16. Conocybe anthuriae
17. Conocybe antipus
18. Conocybe apala
19. Conocybe aporos
20. Conocybe arrhenii
21. Conocybe atkinsonii
22. Conocybe aurea
23. Conocybe australis
24. Conocybe austrofilaris
25. Conocybe bicolor
26. Conocybe bispora
27. Conocybe bisporigera
28. Conocybe brachypodii
29. Conocybe brunnea
30. Conocybe brunneidisca
31. Conocybe brunneoaurantiaca
32. Conocybe brunneola
33. Conocybe bulbifera
34. Conocybe caeruleobasis
35. Conocybe caespitosa
36. Conocybe candida
37. Conocybe capillaripes
38. Conocybe cartilaginipes
39. Conocybe cettoiana
40. Conocybe confundens
41. Conocybe coniferarum
42. Conocybe connata
43. Conocybe coprophila
44. Conocybe corneri
45. Conocybe crispa
46. Conocybe crispella
47. Conocybe curta
48. Conocybe cyanopus
49. Conocybe cylindracea
50. Conocybe cylindrospora
51. Conocybe daamsii
52. Conocybe deliquescens
53. Conocybe dennisii
54. Conocybe dentatomarginata
55. Conocybe diemii
56. Conocybe discorosea
57. Conocybe dubia
58. Conocybe dumetorum
59. Conocybe dunensis
60. Conocybe ealaensis
61. Conocybe echinata
62. Conocybe echinospora
63. Conocybe elegans
64. Conocybe enderlei
65. Conocybe estevei
66. Conocybe exannulata
67. Conocybe excedens
68. Conocybe farinacea
69. Conocybe fibrillosipes
70. Conocybe filaris
71. Conocybe filipes
72. Conocybe fimetaria
73. Conocybe fimicola
74. Conocybe fiorii
75. Conocybe flexipes
76. Conocybe fracticeps
77. Conocybe fragilis
78. Conocybe fuscimarginata
79. Conocybe gigasperma
80. Conocybe glabra
81. Conocybe gracilis
82. Conocybe graminis
83. Conocybe hadrocystis
84. Conocybe haglundii
85. Conocybe halophila
86. Conocybe hausknechtii
87. Conocybe hebelomatoides
88. Conocybe herbarum
89. Conocybe herinkii
90. Conocybe hexagonospora
91. Conocybe hololeuca
92. Conocybe horakii
93. Conocybe hornana
94. Conocybe huijsmanii
95. Conocybe humicola
96. Conocybe incarnata
97. Conocybe incerta
98. Conocybe ingridiae
99. Conocybe inocybeoides
100. Conocybe inopinata
101. Conocybe intermedia
102. Conocybe intrusa
103. Conocybe izonetae
104. Conocybe javanica
105. Conocybe juncicola
106. Conocybe juniana
107. Conocybe karinae
108. Conocybe keniensis
109. Conocybe khasiensis
110. Conocybe lenticulospora
111. Conocybe lentispora
112. Conocybe leporina
113. Conocybe leptospora
114. Conocybe leucopus
115. Conocybe lirata
116. Conocybe lobauensis
117. Conocybe locellina
118. Conocybe macrocephala
119. Conocybe macrorhina
120. Conocybe macrorhiza
121. Conocybe macrospora
122. Conocybe magnispora
123. Conocybe mairei
124. Conocybe mandshurica
125. Conocybe marginata
126. Conocybe megalospora
127. Conocybe merdaria
128. Conocybe mesospora
129. Conocybe mexicana
130. Conocybe michiganensis
131. Conocybe microgranulosa
132. Conocybe microrrhiza
133. Conocybe microsperma
134. Conocybe microspora
135. Conocybe minima
136. Conocybe minuta
137. Conocybe missionum
138. Conocybe mitrispora
139. Conocybe mixta
140. Conocybe mixtus
141. Conocybe monikae
142. Conocybe morenoi
143. Conocybe moseri
144. Conocybe murinacea
145. Conocybe mutabilis
146. Conocybe myosura
147. Conocybe naviculospora
148. Conocybe nemoralis
149. Conocybe neoantipus
150. Conocybe nigrescens
151. Conocybe nigrodisca
152. Conocybe nitrophila
153. Conocybe nivea
154. Conocybe nodulosospora
155. Conocybe novae
156. Conocybe obliquopora
157. Conocybe obscura
158. Conocybe obscurus
159. Conocybe ochracea
160. Conocybe ochraceodisca
161. Conocybe ochraceodiscus
162. Conocybe ochroalbida
163. Conocybe ochrostriata
164. Conocybe oculispora
165. Conocybe olivaceopileata
166. Conocybe pallidospora
167. Conocybe panaeoloides
168. Conocybe papillata
169. Conocybe parapilosella
170. Conocybe parvula
171. Conocybe percincta
172. Conocybe peronata
173. Conocybe peroxydata
174. Conocybe phaedropis
175. Conocybe pilosella
176. Conocybe pinetorum
177. Conocybe pinguis
178. Conocybe pragensis
179. Conocybe praticola
180. Conocybe procera
181. Conocybe proxima
182. Conocybe pseudocrispa
183. Conocybe pseudopubescens
184. Conocybe pubescens
185. Conocybe pulchella
186. Conocybe pulchra
187. Conocybe punjabensis
188. Conocybe pusilla
189. Conocybe pygmaeoaffinis
190. Conocybe radicans
191. Conocybe radicata
192. Conocybe raphanaceus
193. Conocybe reinwaldii
194. Conocybe reticulata
195. Conocybe reticulatorugosa
196. Conocybe rhizophora
197. Conocybe rickeniana
198. Conocybe rickenii
199. Conocybe robertii
200. Conocybe romagnesii
201. Conocybe roseipes
202. Conocybe rostellata
203. Conocybe rugispora
204. Conocybe rugosa
205. Conocybe ruizlealii
206. Conocybe sabulicola
207. Conocybe semidesertorum
208. Conocybe semiglobata
209. Conocybe serrata
210. Conocybe siennophylla
211. Conocybe siliginea
212. Conocybe siligineoides
213. Conocybe singeriana
214. Conocybe solitaria
215. Conocybe sonderiana
216. Conocybe spartea
217. Conocybe spicula
218. Conocybe spiculoides
219. Conocybe spinulosa
220. Conocybe stercoraria
221. Conocybe stictospora
222. Conocybe striatipes
223. Conocybe striipes
224. Conocybe subcrispa
225. Conocybe subleiospora
226. Conocybe subovalis
227. Conocybe subpallida
228. Conocybe subpubescens
229. Conocybe subvelata
230. Conocybe subverrucispora
231. Conocybe subxerophytica
232. Conocybe sulcatipes
233. Conocybe tenera
234. Conocybe tenerrima
235. Conocybe tetraspora
236. Conocybe tetrasporoides
237. Conocybe thermophila
238. Conocybe tortipes
239. Conocybe tucumana
240. Conocybe turkestanica
241. Conocybe tuxtlaensis
242. Conocybe typhicola
243. Conocybe umbellula
244. Conocybe umbonata
245. Conocybe uralensis
246. Conocybe urticae
247. Conocybe utricystidiata
248. Conocybe utriformis
249. Conocybe vaginata
250. Conocybe velata
251. Conocybe velutinomarginata
252. Conocybe velutipes
253. Conocybe verrucispora
254. Conocybe vestita
255. Conocybe vexans
256. Conocybe villosella
257. Conocybe vinaceobrunnea
258. Conocybe viridibrunnescens
259. Conocybe volvata
260. Conocybe volvicystidiata
261. Conocybe volviornata
262. Conocybe volviradicata
263. Conocybe watlingii
264. Conocybe weema
265. Conocybe xerophytica
266. Conocybe xylophila
267. Conocybe zeylanica
268. Conocybe zuccherellii
