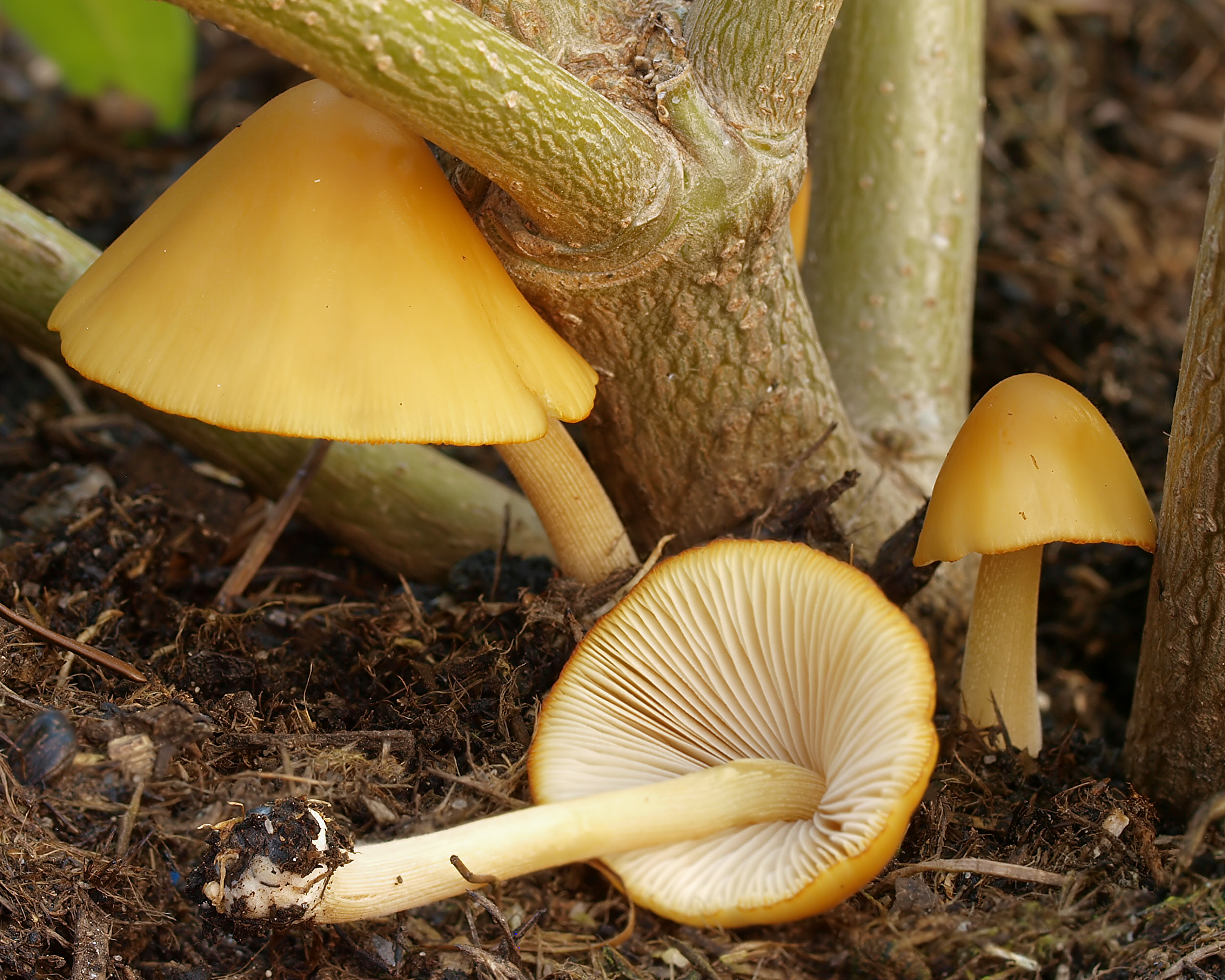

Scientific classification
- Kingdom: Fungi
- Division: Basidiomycota
- Class: Agaricomycetes
- Order: Agaricales
- Family: Bolbitiaceae
- Genus: Conocybe
- Species: C. aurea

Binomial name
- Conocybe aurea (Jul.Schäff.) Hongo (1963)

Synonyms
- Galera aurea Jul.Schäff. (1930); Conocybe tenera var. aurea (Jul.Schäff.) Kühner (1935); Conocybe tenera f. aurea (Jul.Schäff.) Enderle (1999); Conocybe aurea var. hololeuca Hauskn. (2000)

= Conocybe aurea =

Species of fungus

Conocybe aurea, commonly known as the golden dunce cap, is a basidiomycete fungus in the family Bolbitiaceae.

== Taxonomy ==
The fungus was first described to science in 1930 by German mycologist Julius Schäffer, who called it Galera aurea. Tsuguo Hongo transferred it to the genus Conocybe in 1963. In 2000, Anton Hausknecht published the variety C. aurea var. hololeuca, but this taxon is not considered to have independent taxonomic significance by Index Fungorum.

The species is related to Conocybe tenera.

== Habitat and distribution ==
Conocybe aurea is a saprobic fungus that prefers to grow in nitrate-rich soils, fields, woodchip mulch, old compost, and greenhouses. A rare but widespread species, it is found in Europe, Asia, North America, South America, and New Zealand.

== Description ==
The cap is orangish yellow, and up to 5 cm in diameter. The gills and stipe are beige, the former browning with age.

Cap: 0.8-2.2 cm wide or more, starting globose to campanulate before expanding to convex. The surface is smooth but not sticky and is golden yellow to orangy yellow with a deeper colour in the centre of the cap. The cap dries to a chrome yellow colour with paler centre flesh when dry. Gills: Adnate and subdistant with a ventricose bulge. 1.5-3mm wide. They start whitish before developing a cinnamon colour. Stem: 2.5-6.5 cm long and 2-3mm thick and equal across its length or tapering slightly upwards with a slightly bulbous 4-6mm thick base. The interior is hollow and the exterior surface is pruinose with striations and pale yellowish but often discolours to a brownish yellow (fulvous). Flesh: Thin, soft and the same colour as the surface of the cap. Smell: Slight. Taste: Mild. Spores: 10.5-13.5 x 6-7 μm. Elliptical and smooth with a hyaline, apical germ pore. Under the microscope they are yellow. Basidia: 29-37 x 11-12 μm. Four spored. Cheilocystidia: 22-30 x 8-11 μm. Pin-headed and hyaline with a thin wall. Caulocystidia: 22-30 x 7.5-10 μm. Similar to the cheilocystidia.

== Etymology ==
Conocybe aurea
- Mycological characteristics
- Gills on hymenium
- Cap is conical or campanulate
- Hymenium is adnexed
- Stipe is bare
- Spore print is brown
- Ecology is saprotrophic
- Edibility is unknown

The specific epithet aurea is Latin for golden yellow.

== Toxicity ==
The toxicity is unknown. Related species are known to be toxic.

== Similar species ==
Conocybe apala is common, but with a whiter and more fragile conical cap.
