= Aspergillus monodii =

Scientific classification
- Kingdom: Fungi
- Division: Ascomycota
- Class: Eurotiomycetes
- Order: Eurotiales
- Family: Aspergillaceae
- Genus: Aspergillus
- Species: A. monodii

Binomial name
- Aspergillus monodii Samson, R.A.; Varga, J.; Meijer, M.; Frisvad, J.C. 2011

Type strain
- CBS 435.93, LP 89-3570

Synonyms
- Fennellia monodii

Species of fungus

Aspergillus monodii is a coprophilic species of fungus in the genus Aspergillus which has been isolated from an arid zone in Africa.
