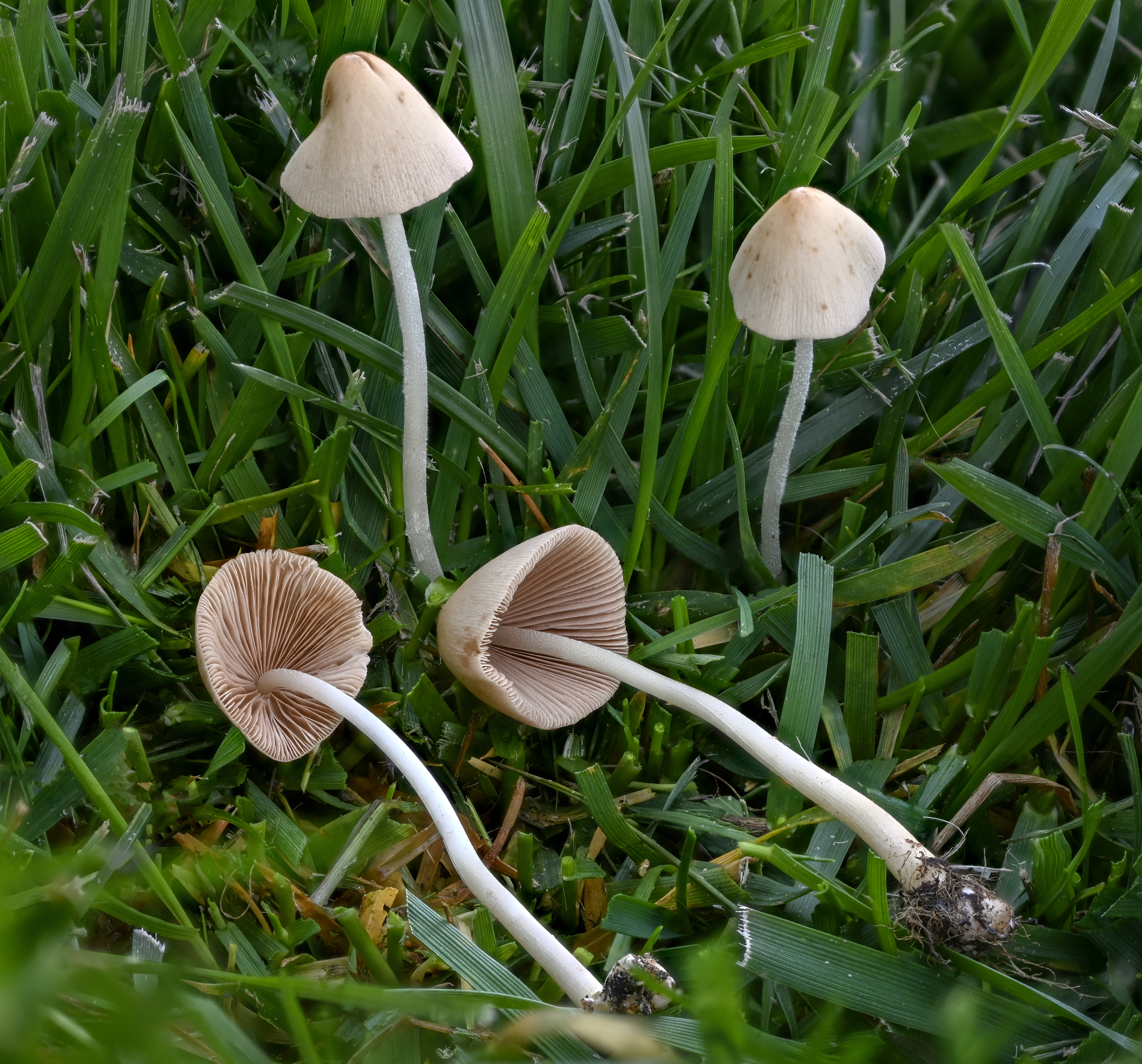

Scientific classification
- Kingdom: Fungi
- Division: Basidiomycota
- Class: Agaricomycetes
- Order: Agaricales
- Family: Bolbitiaceae
- Genus: Conocybe
- Species: C. apala

Binomial name
- Conocybe apala (Fr.) Arnolds (2003)

Synonyms
- Conocybe lactea Conocybe lactea var. huijsmanii Conocybe lateritia Conocybe albipes Bolbitius albipes Bolbitius tener Agaricus apalus Fr. (1818); Pluteolus apalus Quél. (1886); Galera apala Sacc. (1887); Bolbitius apalus Costantin & L.M.Dufour (1891); Derminus apalus Henn. (1898)

= Conocybe apala =

Species of fungus

Conocybe apala Mycological characteristics
- Gills on hymenium
- Cap is conical
- Hymenium is adnexed or free
- Stipe is bare
- Spore print is brown to reddish-brown
- Ecology is saprotrophic
- Edibility is unknown

Conocybe apala is a basidiomycete fungus belonging to the genus Conocybe.

The species has been taxonomically reclassified a number of times. Until recently, it was also commonly called Conocybe lactea or Conocybe albipes and is colloquially known as the white dunce cap or the milky conecap.

It is a fairly common fungus, both in North America and Europe, found growing among short green grass.

== Taxonomy ==
The basionym Agaricus apalus was described by the Swedish mycologist Elias Magnus Fries in 1818. It was placed in the genus Bolbitius as B. albipes by G.H. Otth (1871), then reclassified as Pluteolus apalus by the French mycologist Lucien Quélet in 1886. This was reclassified as Galera hapala (or Galera apala) in 1887 by Pier Andrea Saccardo, then as Bolbitius apalus in 1891 by Julien Noël Costantin and Léon Jean Marie Dufour and finally as Derminus apalus in 1898 by Paul Christoph Hennings.

It was reclassified as Conocybe apala in 2003 by Everhardus Johannes Maria Arnolds.

== Description ==
The cap ranges from 1–3.5 centimetres (1/2–1 1/2 in) in diameter. It has a pale cream to silvery-white colour and may sometimes have a darker yellow to brown coloration towards the central umbo. Its trademark hood-shaped conical cap expands with age and may flatten out, the surface being marked by minute radiating ridges. The stem is cap-coloured, elongated, thin, hollow and more or less equal along its length with a height up to 11 cm (4 1/4 in) and diameter of 1–3 mm. It may bear dust and/or small hairs.

The gills are close and tan before darkening to brown. They are adnexed or free and produce a rusty-brown spore print. The spores are elliptical and brown to reddish-brown.

Very easily missed due to their very small size, the fruit bodies are otherwise quite easy to identify. The flesh has no discernible taste or smell and is extremely fragile to the touch.

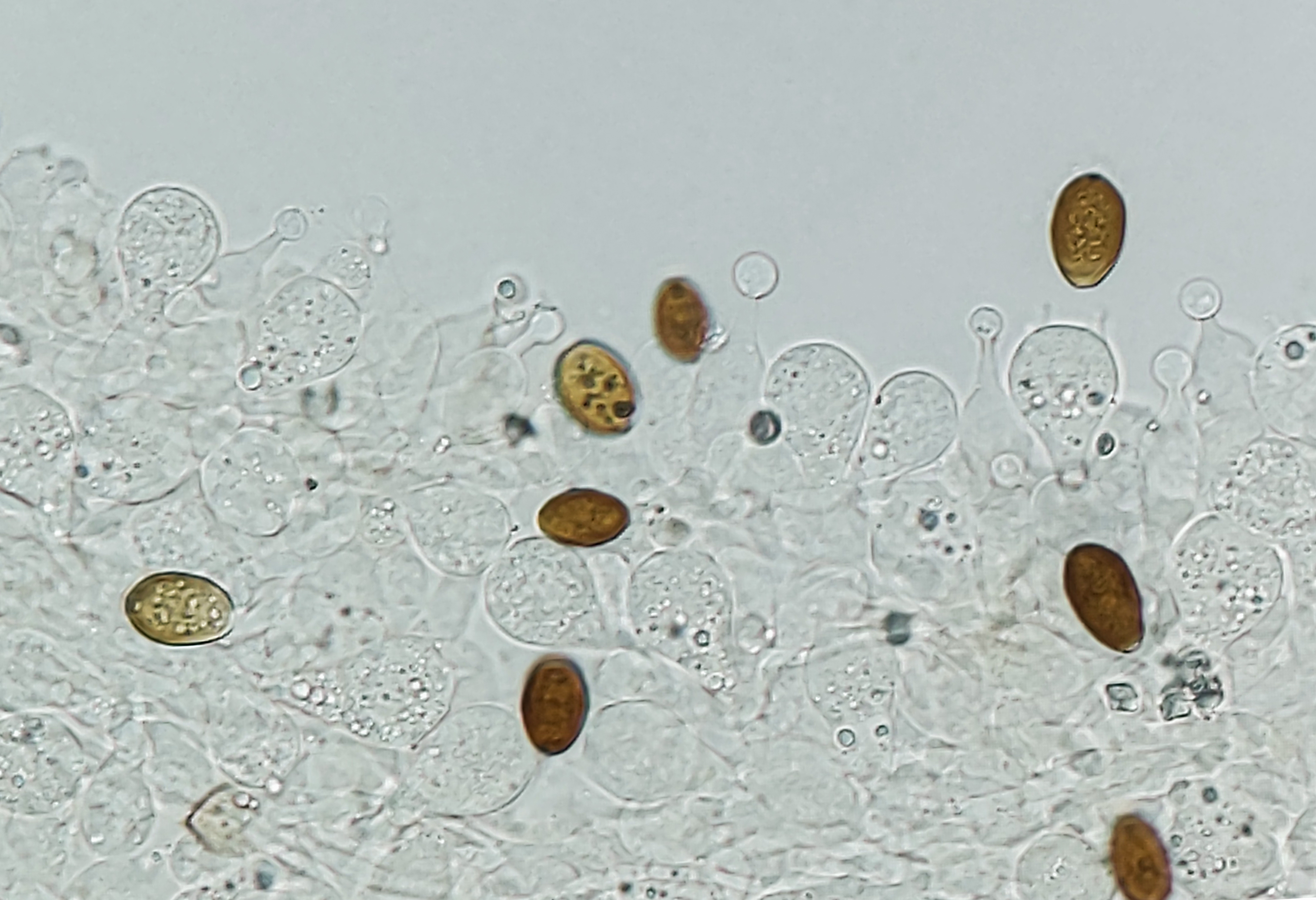
Gill edge 400x

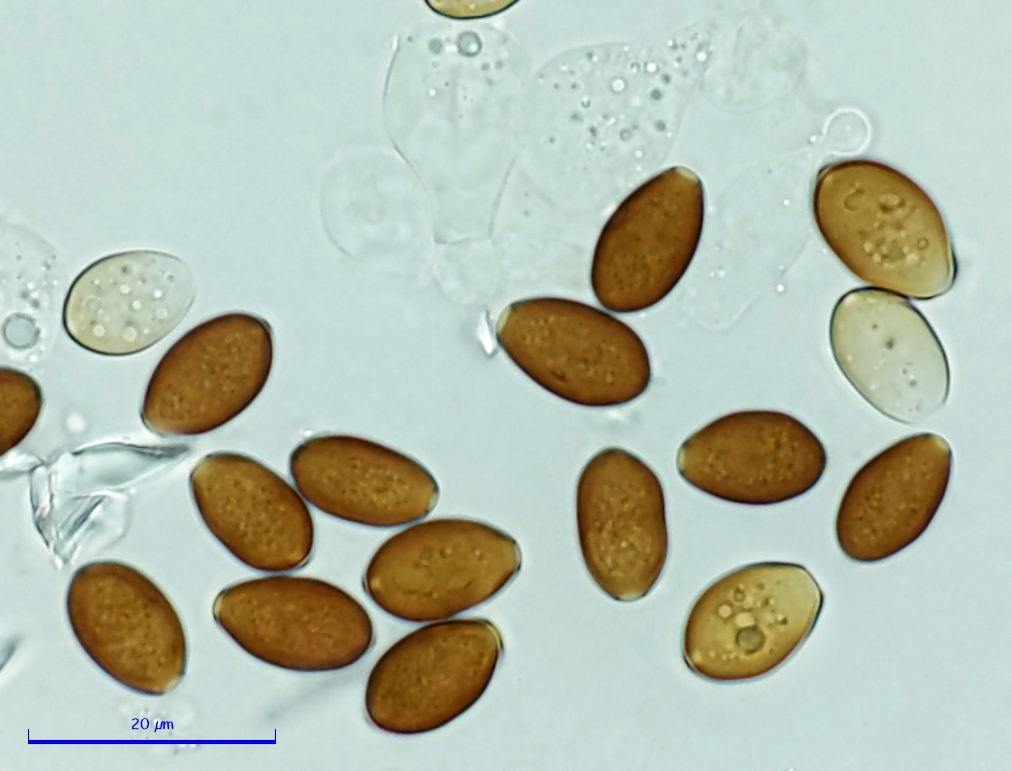
Spores 1000x

=== Similar species ===
Similar species include Conocybe tenera, Conocybe deliquescens, Bolbitius lacteus (which has a flatter, slippery cap), Candolleomyces candolleanus (which is sturdier), and Conocybe rugosa (which has a ring on the stem).

== Habitat and distribution ==
Conocybe apala is a saprobe found in areas with rich soil and short grass such as pastures, playing fields, lawns, meadows as well as rotting manured straw, fruiting single or sparingly few ephemeral bodies. It is commonly found fruiting during humid, rainy weather with generally overcast skies. It will appear on sunny mornings while there is dew but will not persist once it evaporates. In most cases, by midday the delicate fruiting bodies shrivel, dry and bend from sight. The fruiting season begins in spring and ends in autumn. It is distributed across Europe and North America.

== Edibility ==
Edibility is unknown, with one study finding phalloidin in the caps.
