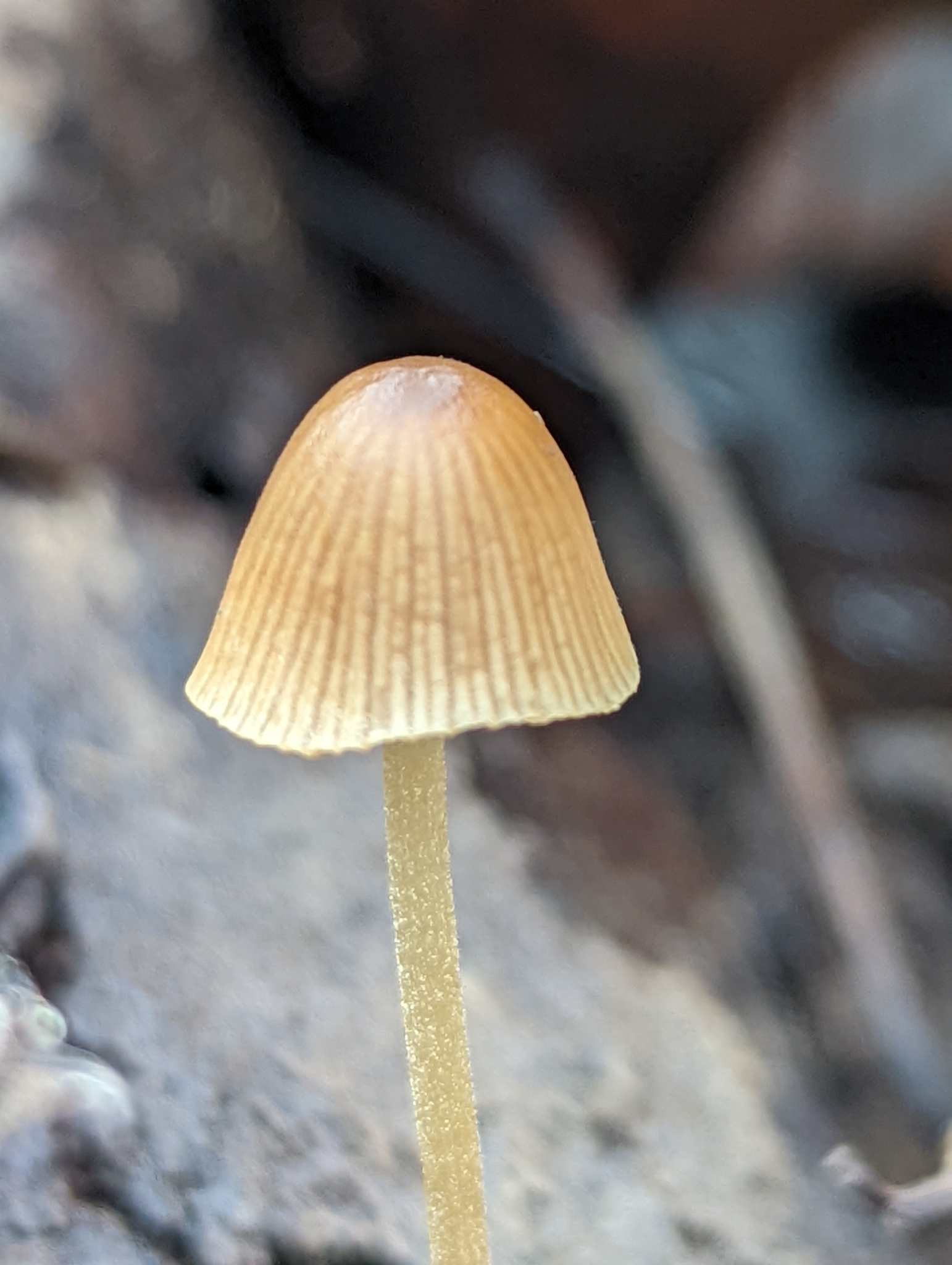

Scientific classification
- Domain: Eukaryota
- Kingdom: Fungi
- Division: Basidiomycota
- Class: Agaricomycetes
- Order: Agaricales
- Family: Bolbitiaceae
- Genus: Conocybe
- Species: C. macrospora

Binomial name
- Conocybe macrospora (G.F. Atk.) Hauskn. (2003)

Synonyms
- Galerula macrospora G.F. Atk. (1918); Conocybe ochracea f. macrospora Kühner ex Watling (1971); Conocybe pubescens var. macrospora E. Ludw (2007); Galera tenera f. bispora J.E. Sass (1929); Conocybe rubiginosa Watling (1980)

= Conocybe macrospora =

Species of fungus

Conocybe macrospora Mycological characteristics
- Gills on hymenium
- Cap is campanulate or convex
- Hymenium is adnexed
- Stipe is bare
- Spore print is brown
- Ecology is saprotrophic
- Edibility is unknown

Conocybe macrospora is a species of mushroom-producing fungus in the family Bolbitiaceae.

== Taxonomy ==
It was described in 1918 by the American mycologist George Francis Atkinson who classified it as Galerula macrospora.

In 1929 John Eugene Sass described Galera tenera f. bispora as a form variant of Galera tenera (now known as Conocybe tenera) which differed from this species by virtue of having two spored basidia with examination of the basidia being the only means noted of distinguishing them. This form is listed as a synonym of Conocybe macrospora by species fungorum.

In 1971 Conocybe ochracea f. macrospora was described by Robert Kühner and Roy Watling and Conocybe rubiginosa as described by Watling is now also considered a synonym.

In 2003 the species was reclassified as Conocybe macrospora by Anton Hausknecht and in Conocybe pubescens var. macrospora as described in 2007 by Erhard Ludwig is now also considered a synonym.

== Description ==
Cap: 0.6–2.5 cm wide and 0.5–2.2 cm tall or up to 4 cm wide and 3 cm tall in the largest specimens, campanulate to convex and often as high as it is wide. The surface is pale orange to brown, hygrophanous and moist with striations running almost to the centre. It is smooth but when viewed under a magnifying glass has fine hairs. Gills: Adnexed, crowded and light yellow brown to light rusty brown with a slight ventricose bulge and lighter edge. Stem: 3.1–10 cm long and 1-3mm thick or up to 15 cm long and 4mm thick in the largest specimens. It is cylindrical with a slightly bulbous base that is 2-6mm thick. The surface is orange yellow with a yellow tip when immature and uniformly brassy yellow to orangy yellow when mature often with a slightly darker orange brown base when old. Longitudinal striations run up the length of the stem and the surface has some hairs. Flesh: Whitish to light yellow in the cap and orangish yellow in the stem. Smell: Odourless or slightly radish like when crushed. Taste: Indistinct.

=== Microscopic details ===
Spores: (11.5) 13.5–21 (23.5) x 7.5–11 (12.5) μm or (15.1) 15.6–19 x 7.8–10.6 μm on average. Ellipsoidal or rarely slightly limoniform (lemon shaped) with a thick wall and large 2–4 μm wide germ pore. Orange-brown to reddish-brown in KOH. Basidia: 18–30 x 9–13.5 μm. 2 spored. Round-petiolate to barrel shaped. Cheilocystidia: 15–22.5 x 6–11 μm. Lecythiform (skittle shaped) with a large 3–4 (5) μm head and thick short neck. Caulocystidia: Mix of lecythiform similar to cheilocystidia but larger and non-lecythiform hairs almost evenly distributed over the length of the stem.

== Habitat and distribution ==
The specimens studied by Atkinson were found growing on the ground amongst mixed grassed and moss on the edge of a coniferous wood near Stockholm, Sweden. Hausknecht described them as growing in grassy, nitrate-rich meadows or in dung, disturbed ground, compost and rarely in leaf litter or on the edge of burnt areas. It is common in Europe and Hausknecht's description was based on collection in Austria in Italy.
