= Coprophilous fungus =

Fungi that grow on animal dung

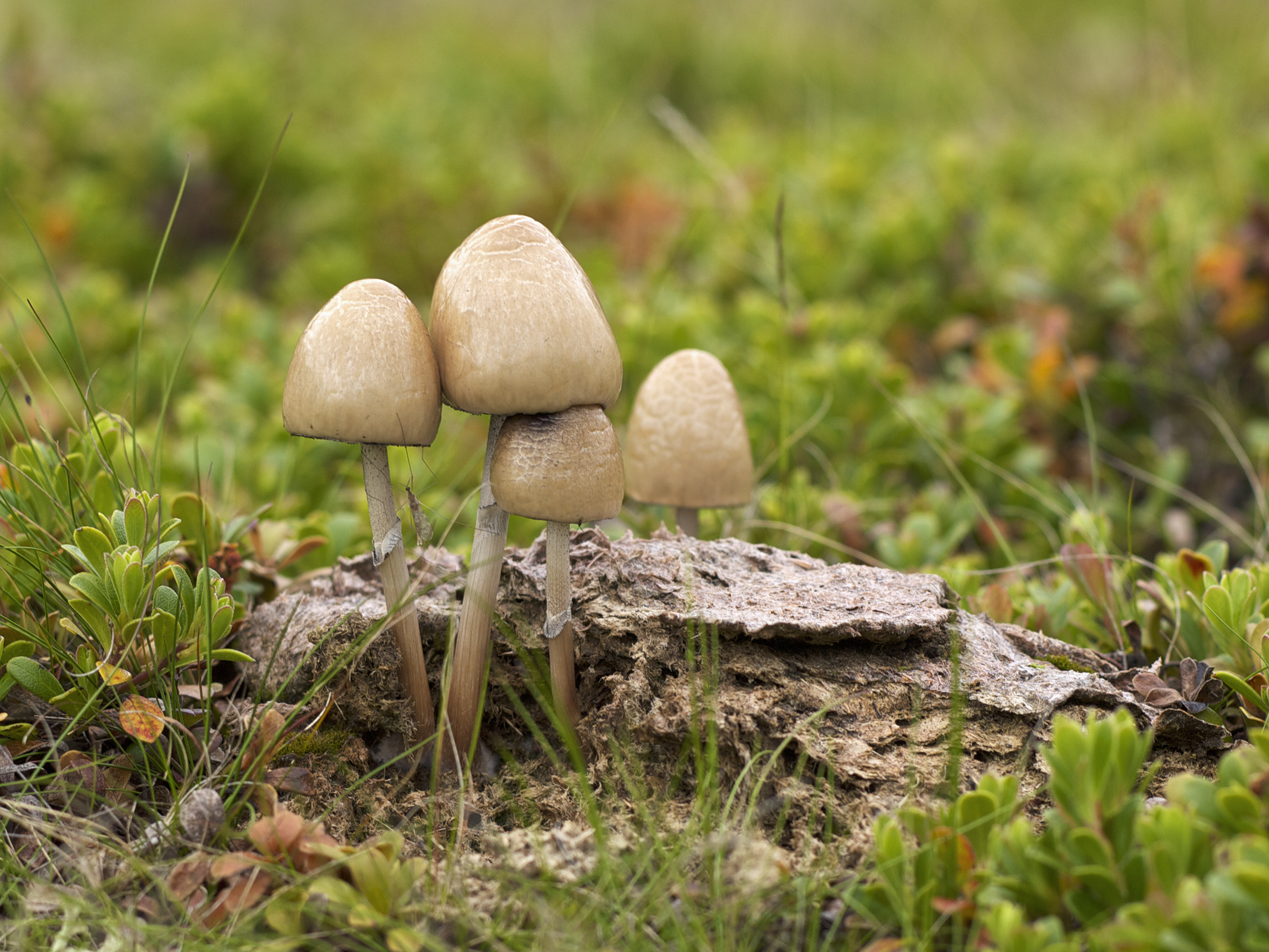
Panaeolus semiovatus var. semiovatus growing from animal dung

A coprophilous fungus (dung-loving fungus) is a type of saprobic fungus that grows on animal dung. The hardy spores of coprophilous species are unwittingly consumed by herbivores from vegetation, and are excreted along with the plant matter. The fungi then flourish in the faeces, before releasing their spores to the surrounding area.

== Life cycle ==
Coprophilous fungi release their spores to the surrounding vegetation, which is then eaten by herbivores. The spores then remain in the animal as the plants are digested, pass through the animal's intestines and are finally defecated. The fruiting bodies of the fungi then grow from the animal feces. It is essential that the spores of the species then reach new plant material; spores remaining in the feces will produce nothing. As such, some species have developed means of discharging spores a large distance. An example of this is the genus Pilobolus. Fruiting bodies of Pilobolus will suddenly rupture, sending the contents over 2 metres away.

Animal feces provide an environment rich in nitrogenous material as well as various enzymes from the animal's digestive system. The spores themselves survive digestion by being particularly thick-walled, allowing them to germinate in the dung with minimum competition from other organisms. This thick wall is often broken down during digestion, readying the spore for germination. The spores are so hardy that samples of dried dung can later be rehydrated, allowing the fungus to fruit weeks later.

== Distribution ==
The distribution of coprophilous fungi is closely linked to the distribution of the herbivores on which they rely, such as rabbits, deer, cattle, horses and sheep. Some species rely on a specific species for dung; for instance, Coprinus radiatus and Panaeolus campanulatus grow almost exclusively on horse feces, while others, such as Panaeolus sphinctrinus, can grow on any feces or even just particularly fertile soil. Further, some species (such as Conocybe rickenii) can be found in large numbers in areas where manure has been used as a soil fertilizer, such as in gardens. Some coprophilous fungi are also known to grow from the dung of omnivores (such as Chaetomium globisporum from rat droppings) or even carnivores (such as Chaetomium rajasthanense, from tiger feces).

== Mushroom-producing species ==
Although not all coprophilous fungi produce mushrooms, there are many that do, particularly in the genera Coprinopsis, Panaeolus and Deconica. Known species include:

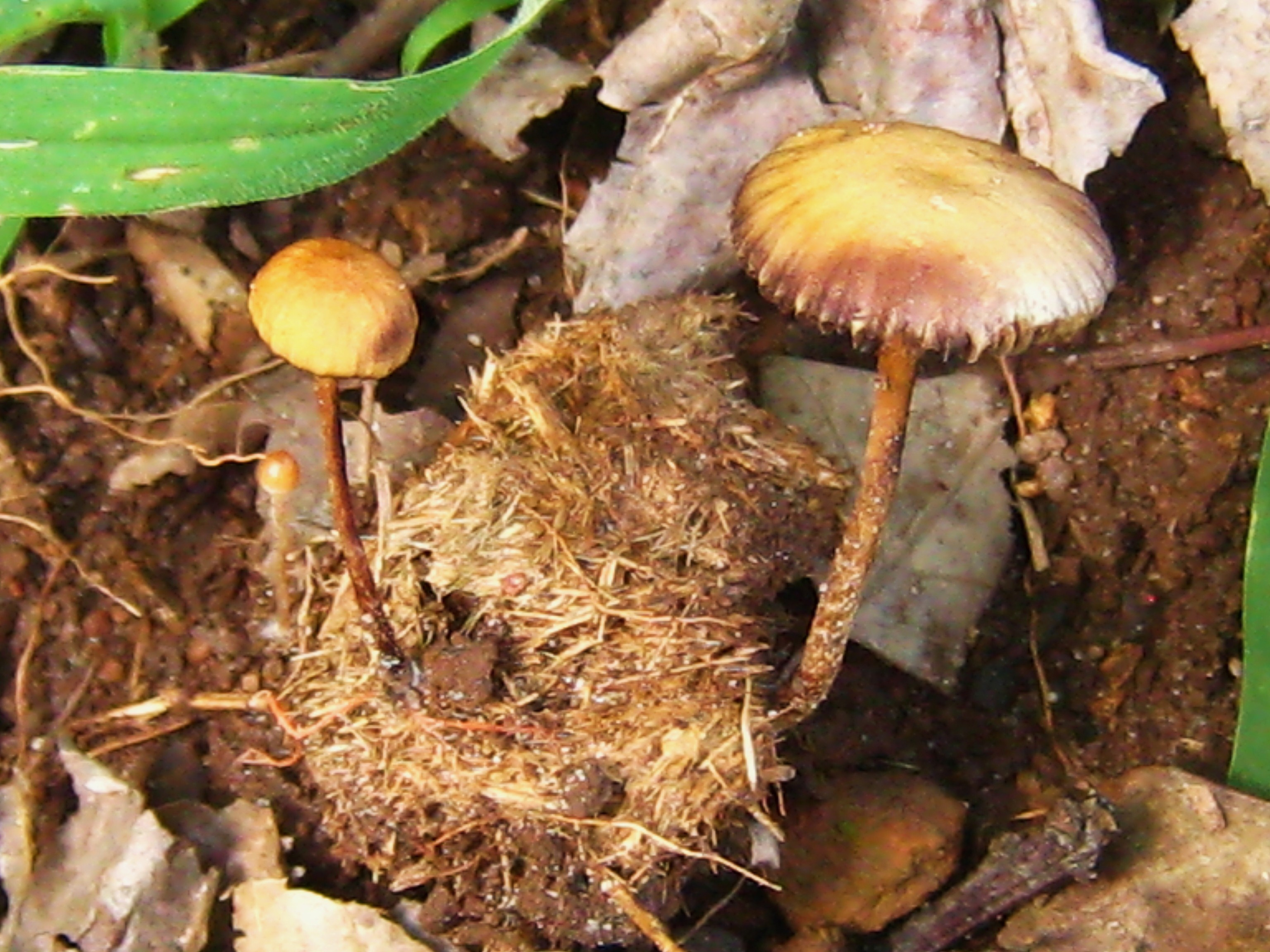
Coprophilous fungi.

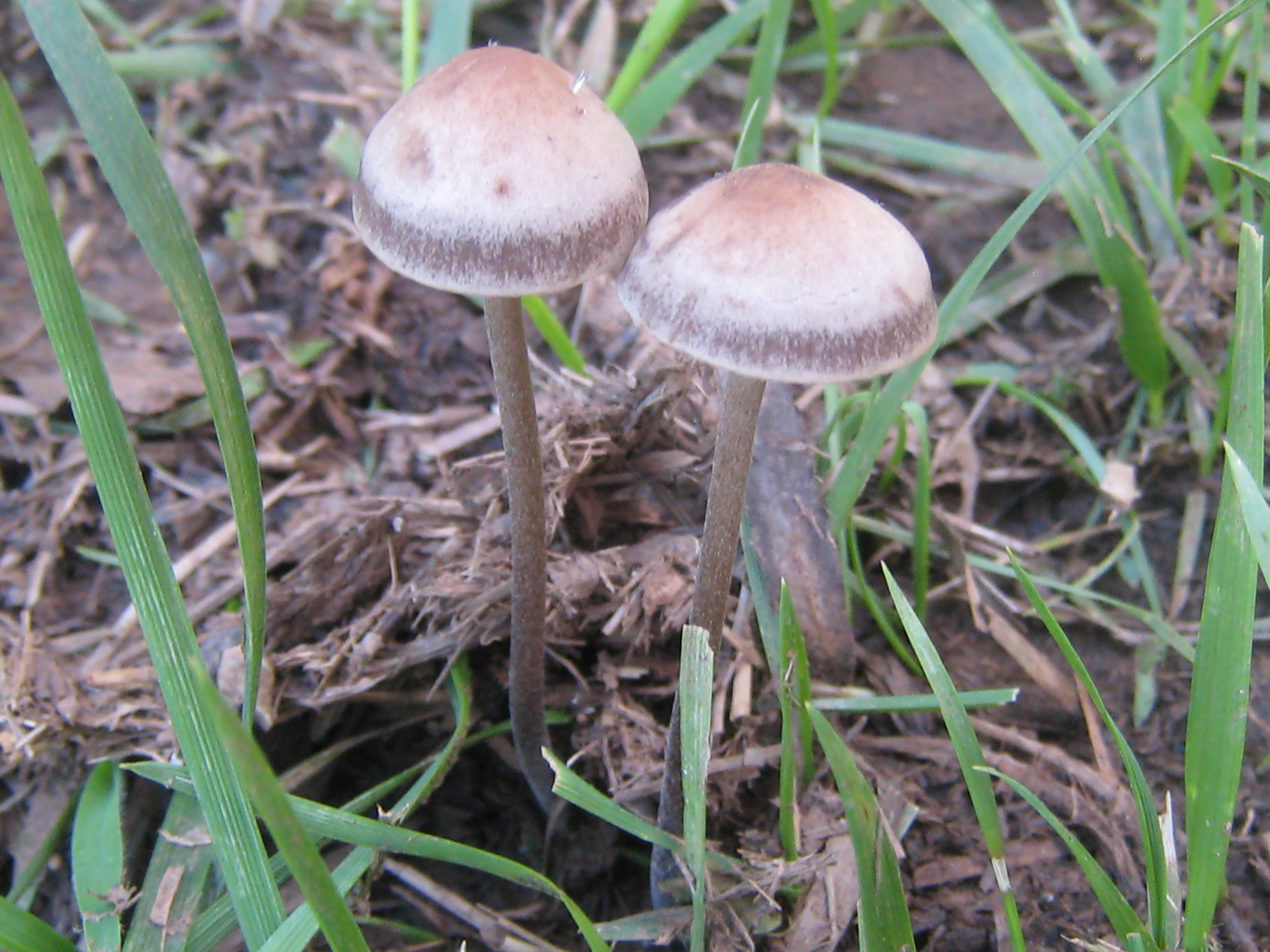
Panaeolus cinctulus growing from horse dung.

- Bolbitius vitellinus
- Conocybe moseri
- Conocybe pubescens
- Conocybe rickenii
- Coprinopsis acuminata
- Coprinopsis cinerea
- Coprinopsis narcotica
- Coprinopsis patouillardii
- Coprinopsis radiata
- Crucibulum laeve
- Cyathus stercoreus
- Deconica coprophila
- Deconica merdaria
- Panaeolus papilionaceus
- Panaeolus semiovatus
- Protostropharia (all species)
- Psilocybe cubensis
- Psilocybe fimetaria
- Psilocybe liniformans
