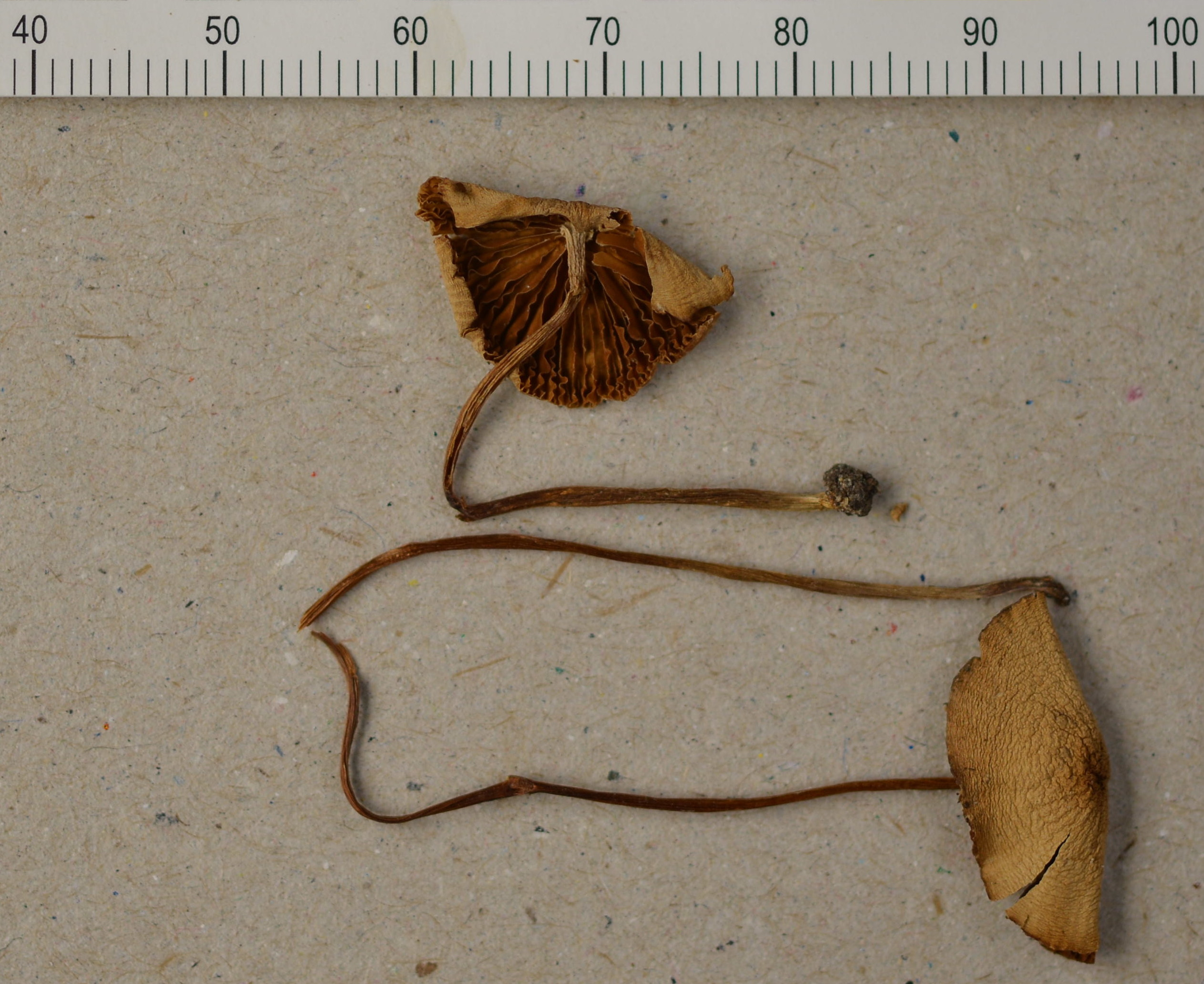

Scientific classification
- Domain: Eukaryota
- Kingdom: Fungi
- Division: Basidiomycota
- Class: Agaricomycetes
- Order: Agaricales
- Family: Bolbitiaceae
- Genus: Conocybe
- Species: C. subpallida

Binomial name
- Conocybe subpallida Enderle (1991)

= Conocybe subpallida =

Species of fungus

Conocybe subpallida Mycological characteristics
- Gills on hymenium
- Cap is convex or conical
- Hymenium is adnate
- Stipe is bare
- Spore print is brown
- Ecology is saprotrophic
- Edibility is unknown

Conocybe subpallida is a species of mushroom-producing fungus in the family Bolbitiaceae.

== Taxonomy ==
It was described in 1991 by the mycologist Manfred Enderle who classified it as Conocybe subpallida.

In 1992 the species Conocybe subalpina was described by Rolf Singer and Anton Hausknecht as a reclassification of Singer's 1989 Conocybe mesospora var. subalpina. However this species is now considered a synonym as it was reclassified as Conocybe subpallida var. subalpina in 2003 by Everhardus Johannes Maria Arnolds.

== Description ==
Cap: 3.5–5 cm wide, starting hemispherical when young then convex to conical before expanding to flat convex. The hygrophanous surface is very pale ochre or light cream with faint striations and a darker brown centre. Stem: 6.5–8 cm long and 3 mm thick with a slightly narrower apex and wide base. The surface is light cream coloured with striations and a pruinose coating over the entire length and a slightly tomentose base. It is fragile and becomes more light brown with age. Gills: Close to crowded, adnate with a small tooth, cinnamon coloured and developing a saffron tinge with age and a lighter edge. Spores: 10–11.6 x 5.8-6.8 μm. Ellipsoid to elongated ovoid to amygdaliform with inconspicuous germ pore and apicule. Ochre-yellow in a 10% solution of ammonia. Basidia: 4 spored.

== Habitat and distribution ==
The specimens studied by Enderle were found growing in a cow pasture between the remains of old grass, wood and cow manure as well as on the side of roads by forests and in grass under trees.
