= Conocybe intrusa =

Scientific classification
- Kingdom: Fungi
- Division: Basidiomycota
- Class: Agaricomycetes
- Order: Agaricales
- Family: Bolbitiaceae
- Genus: Conocybe
- Species: C. intrusa

Binomial name
- Conocybe intrusa (Peck) Singer

Species of fungus

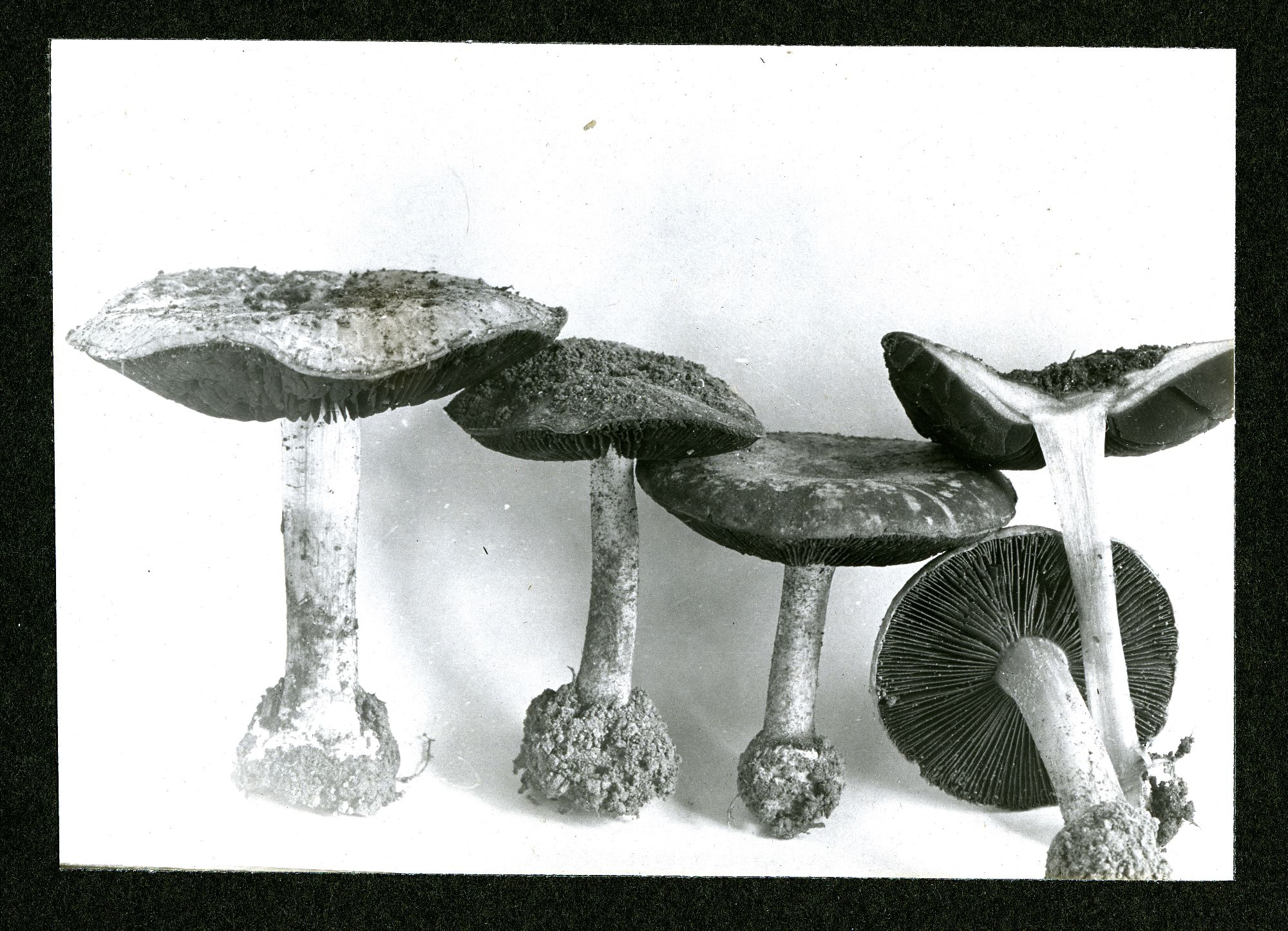
Conocybe intrusa (Peck) Singer 4104470351

Conocybe intrusa is a species of fungus belonging to the family Bolbitiaceae.

It is native to Europe and Northern America.
