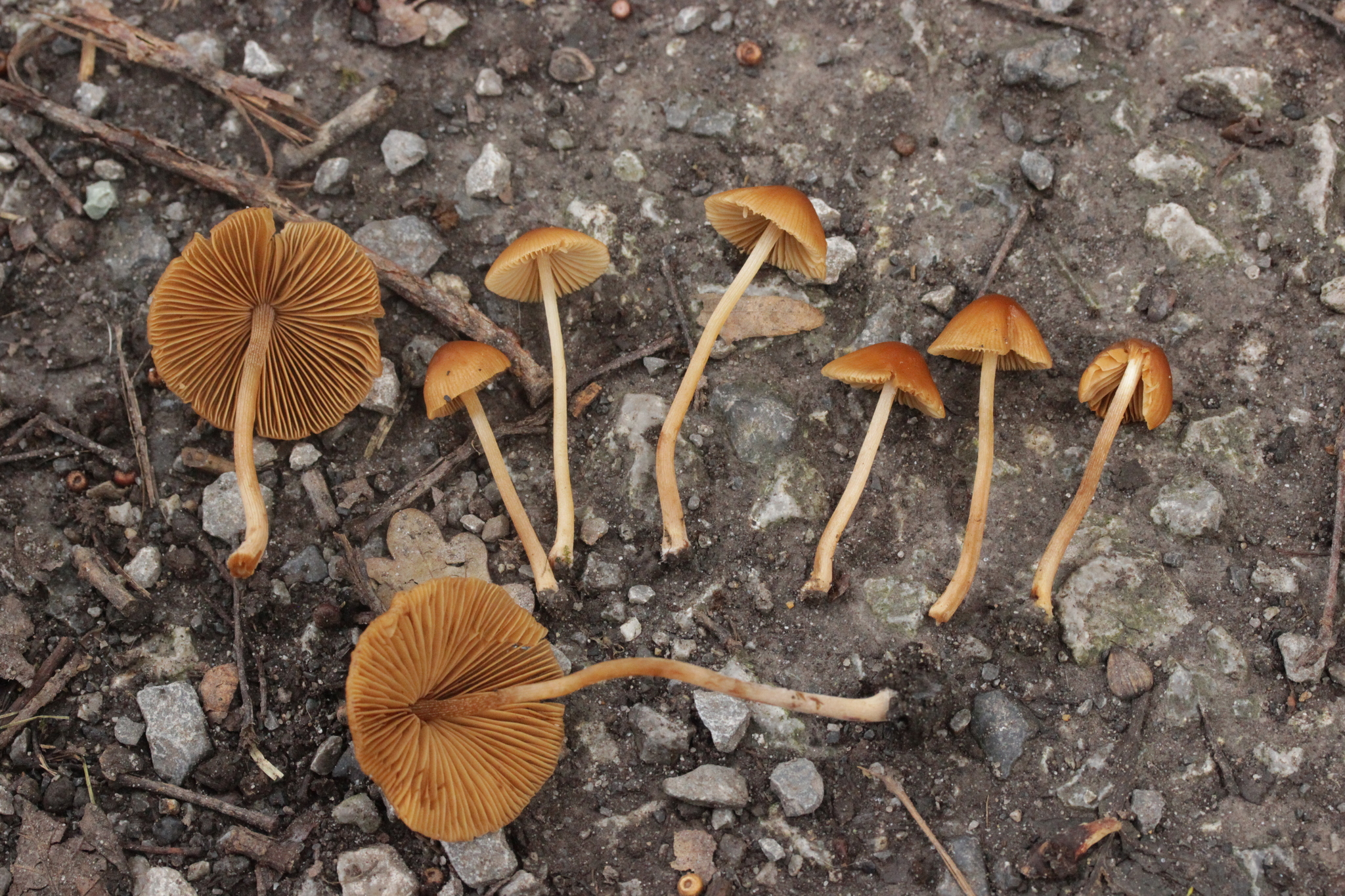

Scientific classification
- Domain: Eukaryota
- Kingdom: Fungi
- Division: Basidiomycota
- Class: Agaricomycetes
- Order: Agaricales
- Family: Bolbitiaceae
- Genus: Conocybe
- Species: C. mesospora

Binomial name
- Conocybe mesospora (Kühner) Watling (1980)

= Conocybe mesospora =

Species of fungus

Conocybe mesospora Mycological characteristics
- Gills on hymenium
- Cap is ovate or convex
- Hymenium is adnexed
- Stipe is bare
- Spore print is brown
- Ecology is saprotrophic
- Edibility is unknown

Conocybe mesospora is a species of mushroom-producing fungus in the family Bolbitiaceae.

== Taxonomy ==
It was described as Conocybe mesospora in 1935 by the French mycologist Robert Kühner but the classification was invalid. It was described again in 1980 by the Scottish mycologist Roy Watling who classified it as Conocybe mesospora.

== Description ==
Cap: 0.9-2.5 cm wide and semiglobate to convex or sometimes campanulate with a slight umbo. When young the centre is rust brown to chestnut brown with a lighter orange brown colour towards the margins and becoming lighter with age. It is smooth and hygrophanous with striations that are more distinct when moist. Stem: 2–6.5 cm long and 1–2.5 mm or at most 4m thick with a small, distinct bulbous base that is 1.3–3 mm or 6 mm at most. The surface is pale yellow when young with a slightly darker base and it matures to an orangy yellow with a dirty coloured base. The entire surface has a pruinose coating. Gills: Close to distant, rusty yellow to light rusty brown. Spores: (6.5) 7.5-10 (11) x (4) 4.5-5.7 (6.5) μm. Smooth and thick walled with a broad germ pore. Yellow in water and rusty brown in KOH. Basidia: 19-27 x 8.5-10.5 μm. 2 to 4 spored.

== Habitat and distribution ==
Found in woods, meadows and fields especially along paths in ditches and on the margins of fields and also found in dry places amongst grass and shrubs. May until October in Austria with a peak during September.
