= Conocybe affinis =

Scientific classification
- Domain: Eukaryota
- Kingdom: Fungi
- Division: Basidiomycota
- Class: Agaricomycetes
- Order: Agaricales
- Family: Bolbitiaceae
- Genus: Conocybe
- Species: C. affinis

Binomial name
- Conocybe affinis (Singer) (1969)

Species of fungus

Conocybe affinis Mycological characteristics
- Gills on hymenium
- Cap is convex or campanulate
- Hymenium is adnate
- Stipe is bare
- Spore print is brown
- Ecology is saprotrophic
- Edibility is unknown

Conocybe affinis is a species of mushroom-producing fungus in the family Bolbitiaceae.

== Taxonomy ==
It was described in 1969 by Rolf Singer who classified it as Conocybe affinis.

== Description ==
Cap: (5) 7-12 (20)mm wide, semiglobose to convex or campanulate. The surface is uniformly light brown or tan but fades with age leaving the cap centre and margins slightly darker brown but as it is hygrophanous the colours can become darker after remoistening. It is smooth and without striations when young with distinct or indistinct striations with age. Stem: 2.8-6.5 cm long and 1-2 (2.5)mm thick with or without a slightly bulbous 1.3-3mm base. The surface is white-orange to dull pale orange when young and becomes darker with age with a fine pruinose coating all over which is almost floccose above the base when young. Gills: Adnate, close and darker brown than the cap and stem. Spores: (9) 10–12.5 (13.5) x (5.5) 6-7 (7.5) μm. Ellipsoid and smooth with a double wall of around 0.5 μm thick and a broad 1.8μm germ pore. Yellow in water turning reddish or rusty brown in KOH with a reddish tint to the wall in both water and KOH. Basidia: 17-22 x 9.7-11 μm. 4 spored.

== Habitat and distribution ==
In open habitats such as meadows and road sides often with sandy or gravelly soil and also found on South facing slopes up to 300m in altitude. Found in May and June in Central Europe with collections from Argentina in parks and gardens during January and November.
