= Conocybe crispella =

Scientific classification
- Domain: Eukaryota
- Kingdom: Fungi
- Division: Basidiomycota
- Class: Agaricomycetes
- Order: Agaricales
- Family: Bolbitiaceae
- Genus: Conocybe
- Species: C. crispella

Binomial name
- Conocybe crispella (Murrill) Singer (1950)

Synonyms
- Galera crispella Murrill (1942); Galerula crispella Murrill (1942)

Species of fungus

Conocybe crispella Mycological characteristics
- Gills on hymenium
- Cap is conical
- Hymenium is free
- Stipe is bare
- Spore print is brown
- Ecology is saprotrophic
- Edibility is unknown

Conocybe crispella is a species of mushroom-producing fungus in the family Bolbitiaceae.

== Taxonomy ==
It was described in 1942 by the American mycologist William Alphonso Murrill who classified it as Galerula crispella.

It was reclassified as Conocybe crispella in 1950 by the German mycologist Rolf Singer.

== Description ==
Cap: 1–2.5 cm wide and conical. The hygrophanous surface is pale cinnamon to clay brown with an ochre tint with most of the striations transparent and a minute pruinose surface visible with a lens. It is dry and very brittle. Stem: 4.5–9 cm long and 1.5-2mm thick with a bulbous base of up to 8mm thick. The surface is off white with a pale pink tint and minute white hairs over the entire length but absent striations. It is dry, hollow and extremely brittle. Gills: Free, crowded and pale rusty ochre. Spore print: Rusty ochre brown. Spores: 12–14.5 x 7-8 μm. Broadly amygdaliform in side view and ellipsoid in front view. Smooth with a thick wall of up to 1 μm and a distinct germ pore. Rusty ochre brown in colour. Basidia: 20-25 x 12-14 μm. 4 spored, clavate.

== Habitat and distribution ==
The specimens studied by Singer were found amongst grass in shaded lawns and woods, on the soil or on dung from January to June in Argentina and in August in Florida. They have also been found on soil in gardens and in lawns in the Cook Islands, Mauritius, Seychelles and Réunion.
