= Conocybe subxerophytica =

Scientific classification
- Domain: Eukaryota
- Kingdom: Fungi
- Division: Basidiomycota
- Class: Agaricomycetes
- Order: Agaricales
- Family: Bolbitiaceae
- Genus: Conocybe
- Species: C. subxerophytica

Binomial name
- Conocybe subxerophytica Singer & Hauskn. (1992)

Species of fungus

Conocybe subxerophytica Mycological characteristics
- Gills on hymenium
- Cap is convex or campanulate
- Hymenium is adnate
- Stipe is bare
- Spore print is brown
- Ecology is saprotrophic
- Edibility is unknown

Conocybe subxerophytica is a species of mushroom-producing fungus in the family Bolbitiaceae.

== Taxonomy ==
It was described in 1992 by Rolf Singer and Anton Hausknecht who classified it as Conocybe subxerophytica.

== Description ==
Cap: 4-12 (15)mm wide and semiglobate to slightly campanulate or convex. When young the surface is rusty brown or light sienna brown becoming lighter and brighter with age to develop a tan colour with yellowish margins whilst the centre remains darker brown. Smooth and hygrophanous with only slight striations. Stem: 2–3.5 cm long and 0.8-1.5mm thick with a slightly bulbous 1-2mm base. The surface is light yellowish white when young and more yellow in the middle but matures to ochre or rusty yellow all over. The entire surface has a farinose-pruinose coating sometimes with slight striations running up the length of the stem. Gills: Adnate, subdistant, starting light yellow but maturing to rusty brown. Spores: (8) 9.5-12 (14) x (5.5) 6.3-7.5 (9) x (4) 5-5-7 (7.5) μm. Lentiform and smooth with a wall that is around 0.5 μm thick and a broad 1.2-2 μm germ pore. Yellow in water turning chestnut or rusty brown in KOH with a reddish tint to the wall in both water and KOH. Basidia: 15-22 x 8.5-11.5 μm. 4 spored.

== Etymology ==
The specific epithet subxerophytica is named for the xerophytic environment in which the species is found.

== Habitat and distribution ==
In dry grassland in open spaces and on South facing slopes with sandy, gravelly or loess soil. From May to June or sometimes until September. The specimens studied by Singer and Hausknecht were found in Austria and Greece.
