= Conocybe siligineoides =

Scientific classification
- Kingdom: Fungi
- Division: Basidiomycota
- Class: Agaricomycetes
- Order: Agaricales
- Family: Bolbitiaceae
- Genus: Conocybe
- Species: C. siligineoides

Binomial name
- Conocybe siligineoides R.Heim (1957)

Species of fungus

Conocybe siligineoides, also known as cone caps, Ya'nte, Ta'a'ya, or Tamu, is a species of macro-fungus in the family Bolbitiaceae. It has seldom been observed by the mycological community with all specimens having been collected in Mexico. Originally reported as a sacred mushroom, no chemical studies have been undertaken on this species although other members of the same genus have been shown to contain psilocybin, which causes strong hallucinations. They are crushed, dried, and used in tea, and consumed fresh.

== Description ==
It is a thin, small, about 3 inches (7.6 cm) in height, mushroom that is reddish-orange with a cone or bell shaped cap. When spores are forming the cap will turn a rusty color.

== Traditional uses ==
The Mazatec used this fungus as an entheogenic. The Aztec called them sacred mushrooms and used them for healing and various rituals. A cult in the Ivory Coast of Africa has found to be centered on "Tamu".
