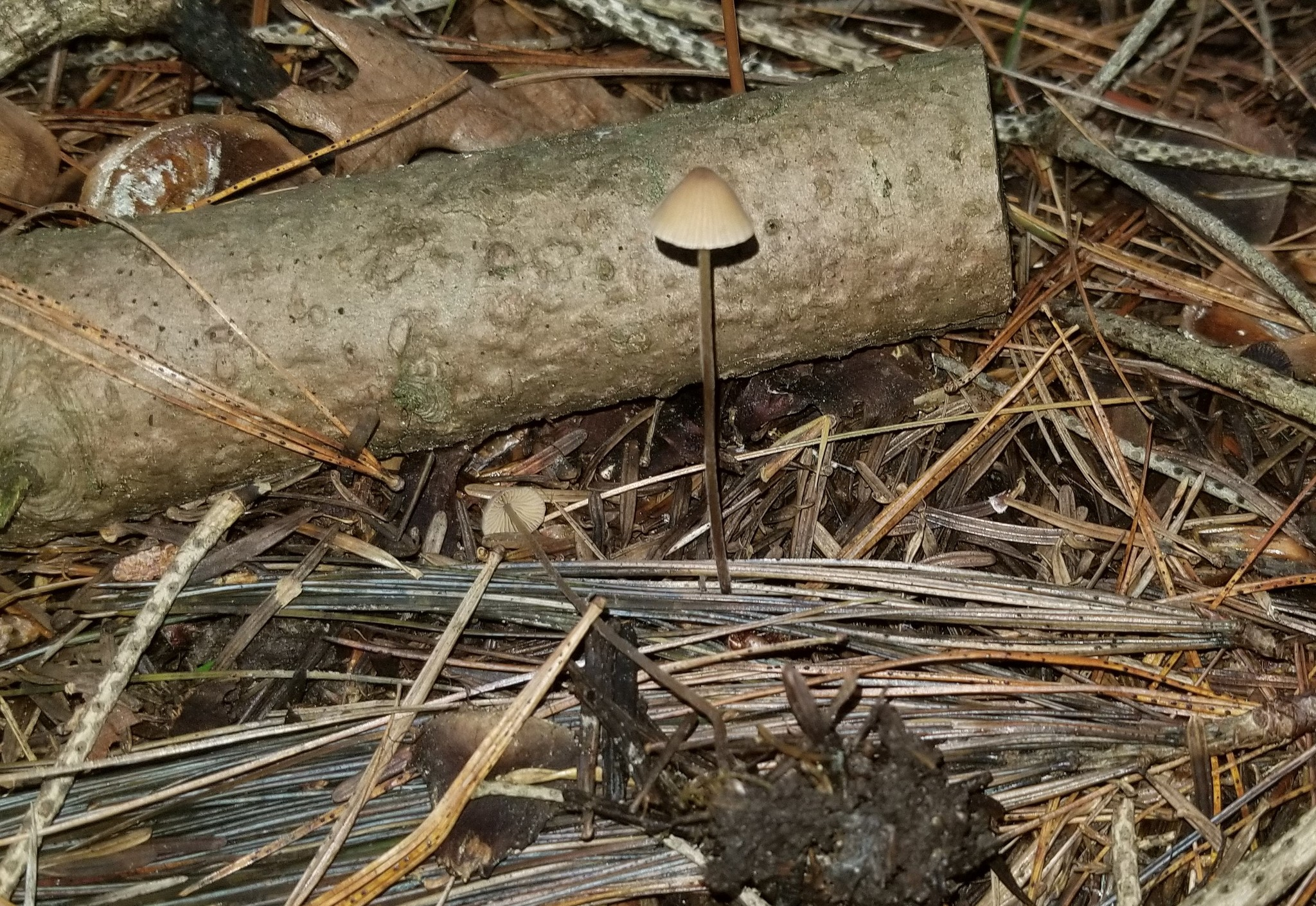

Scientific classification
- Kingdom: Fungi
- Division: Basidiomycota
- Class: Agaricomycetes
- Order: Agaricales
- Family: Bolbitiaceae
- Genus: Conocybe
- Species: C. velutipes

Binomial name
- Conocybe velutipes (Velen.) Hauskn. & Svrcek 1999

Synonyms
- Conocybe kuehneriana Singer (1969); Galera velutipes Velen. 1939; Conocybe ochracea

= Conocybe velutipes =

Species of fungus

Conocybe velutipes is a species of mushroom in the Bolbitiaceae family.

Description: Pileus 8–22(32) mm broad, up to 15 mm high, campanulate, conical or convex at first, slightly expanding to conic-convex, hygrophanous, when moist and fresh at center orangey brown, reddish brown or dull brown to the margin pale brown or ochraceous, translucently striate up to halfway of the radius or more, on drying soon not striate, pallescent to ochre-brown or ochre-yellow, pubescent when young, becoming glabrous in age. Lamellae moderately crowded, adnexed, often slightly ventricose, ochraceous at first, becoming orange-brown with concolorous or slightly paler, fimbriate edge. Stipe 30–90 × 1–2.5 mm, cylindrical with base slightly thicker to sub-bulbous, up to 6 mm, not rooting, cream-colored at apex, pale orange to pale brown at first, becoming orange-brown to reddish brown in lower half from base upwards, without veil remains, entirely striate lengthwise and minutely pubescent. Context thin, fragile, concolorous with surface. Smell and taste not distinctive. Spore print orange-brown.
