= Conocybe elegans =

Scientific classification
- Domain: Eukaryota
- Kingdom: Fungi
- Division: Basidiomycota
- Class: Agaricomycetes
- Order: Agaricales
- Family: Bolbitiaceae
- Genus: Conocybe
- Species: C. elegans

Binomial name
- Conocybe elegans Watling 1983

Species of fungus

Conocybe elegans is a mushroom species in the genus Conocybe found in Denmark.
