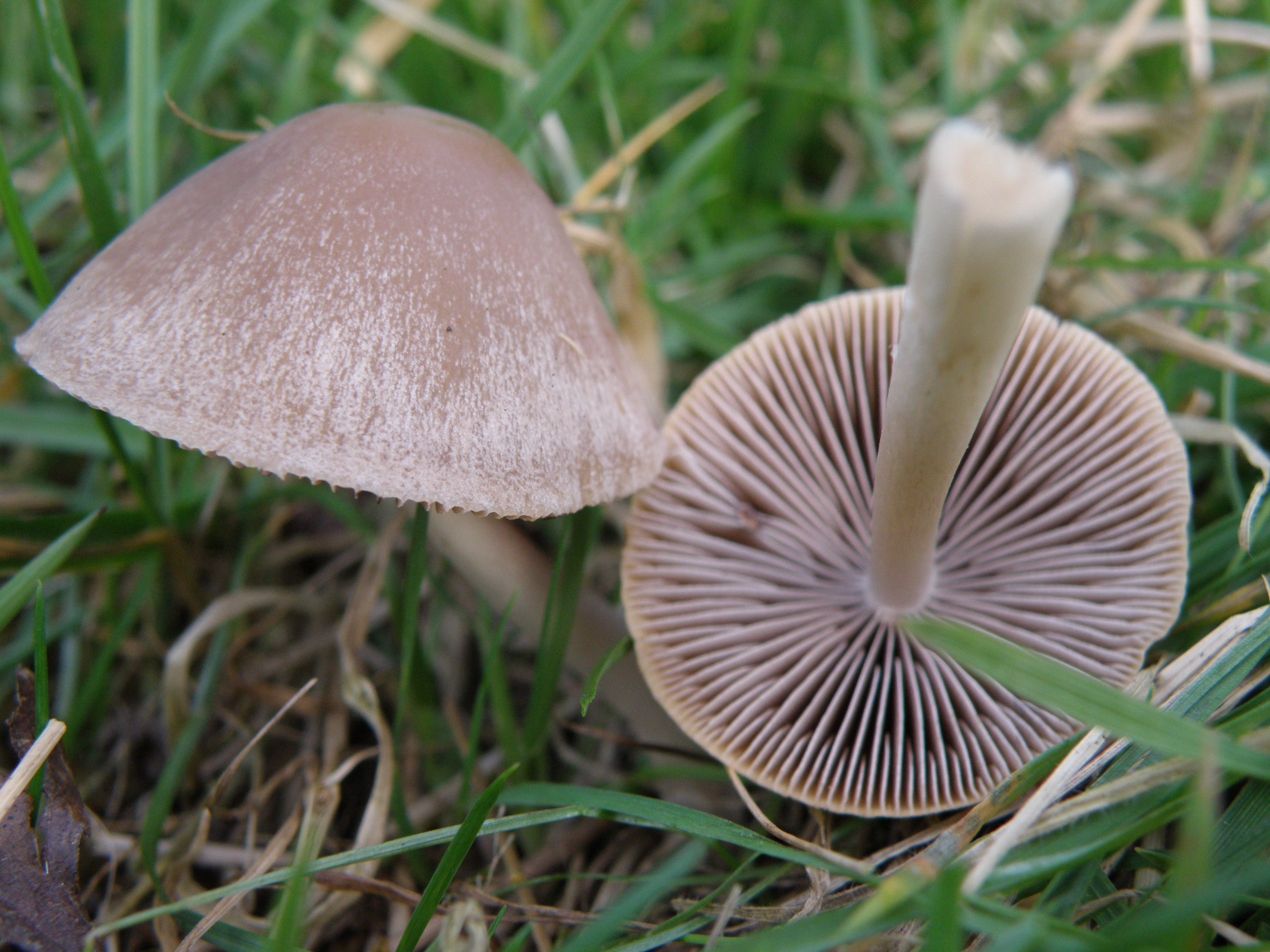
- Two Conocybe rickenii, England

Scientific classification
- Kingdom: Fungi
- Division: Basidiomycota
- Class: Agaricomycetes
- Order: Agaricales
- Family: Bolbitiaceae
- Genus: Conocybe
- Species: C. rickenii

Binomial name
- Conocybe rickenii (Jul.Schäff.) Kühner (1935)

Synonyms
- Galera rickenii Jul.Schäff. (1930); Conocybe siliginea f. rickenii (Jul.Schäff.) Arnolds (2003)

= Conocybe rickenii =

Species of fungus

Conocybe rickenii
- Mycological characteristics
- Gills on hymenium
- Cap is conical
- Hymenium is adnate
- Stipe is bare
- Spore print is brown
- Ecology is saprotrophic
- Edibility is not recommended

Conocybe rickenii is a mushroom from the genus Conocybe. Its edibility is disputed, and it has the appearance of a typical little brown mushroom with a small, conical cap, and long, thin stem. In colour, it is generally a cream-brown, lighter on the stem, and it has a thin layer of flesh with no distinct smell or taste. It is a coprophilous fungus, feeding off dung and it is most common on very rich soil or growing directly from dung. It can be found in Europe, Australia and Pacific islands.

== Taxonomy ==
Conocybe rickenii was first described in 1930 by German mycologist Julius Schäffer and named Galera rickenii. It was reclassified by Robert Kühner, who placed it in the genus Conocybe.

== Description ==
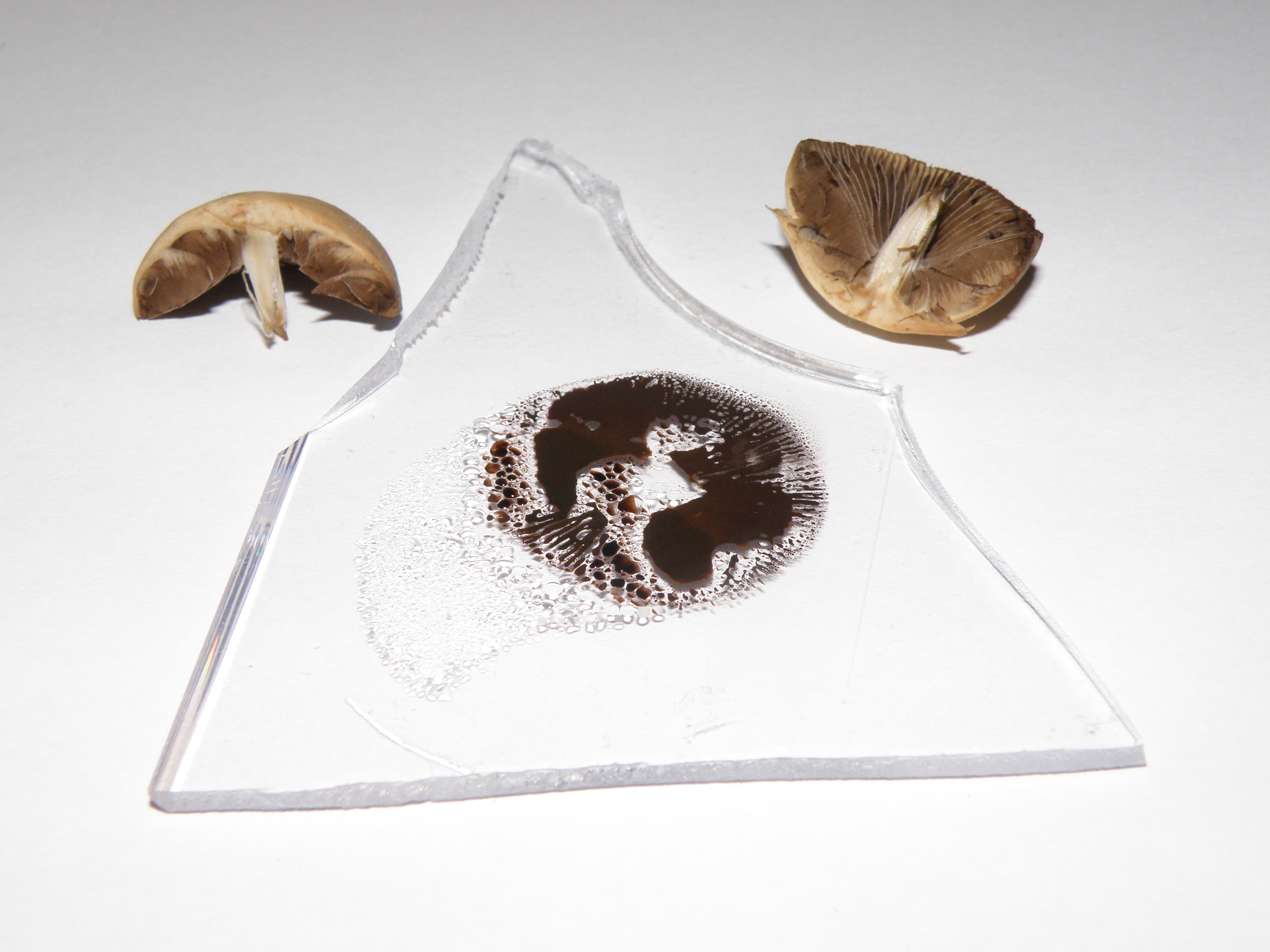
Spore print and split cap. The cap is discoloured.

Conocybe rickenii has a conical cap of 1 to 2.5 centimetres (0.4 to 1.0 in) across, which is an ochre-brown, sometimes becoming a little more grey at the centre. The stem is typically 40 to 70 millimetres (1.6 to 2.8 in) in height, by 1 to 2 millimetres (0.04 to 0.08 in) in thickness, and is whitish cream, darkening to a dirty brown with age. The thin layer of flesh is grey-brown in the cap, while lighter in the stem. It has ochre-cream (later darkening to rusty-ochre) gills, which are adnate, leaving a brown spore print. The spores themselves are elliptic to oval, measuring between 10–20 μm by 6–12 μm. It has two-spored basidia, and a cellular cap cuticle.

It is generally a little larger than the slightly more common coprophilous C. pubescens, while it can be differentiated from other dung-loving Conocybe by its two-spored basidia, large spores and the fact it does not have lecythiform (flask-shaped) caulocystidia.

== Edibility ==
British mycologist Roger Phillips lists the edibility as unknown, while David Pegler considers it inedible. The flesh has no distinct smell or taste.

== Distribution and habitat ==
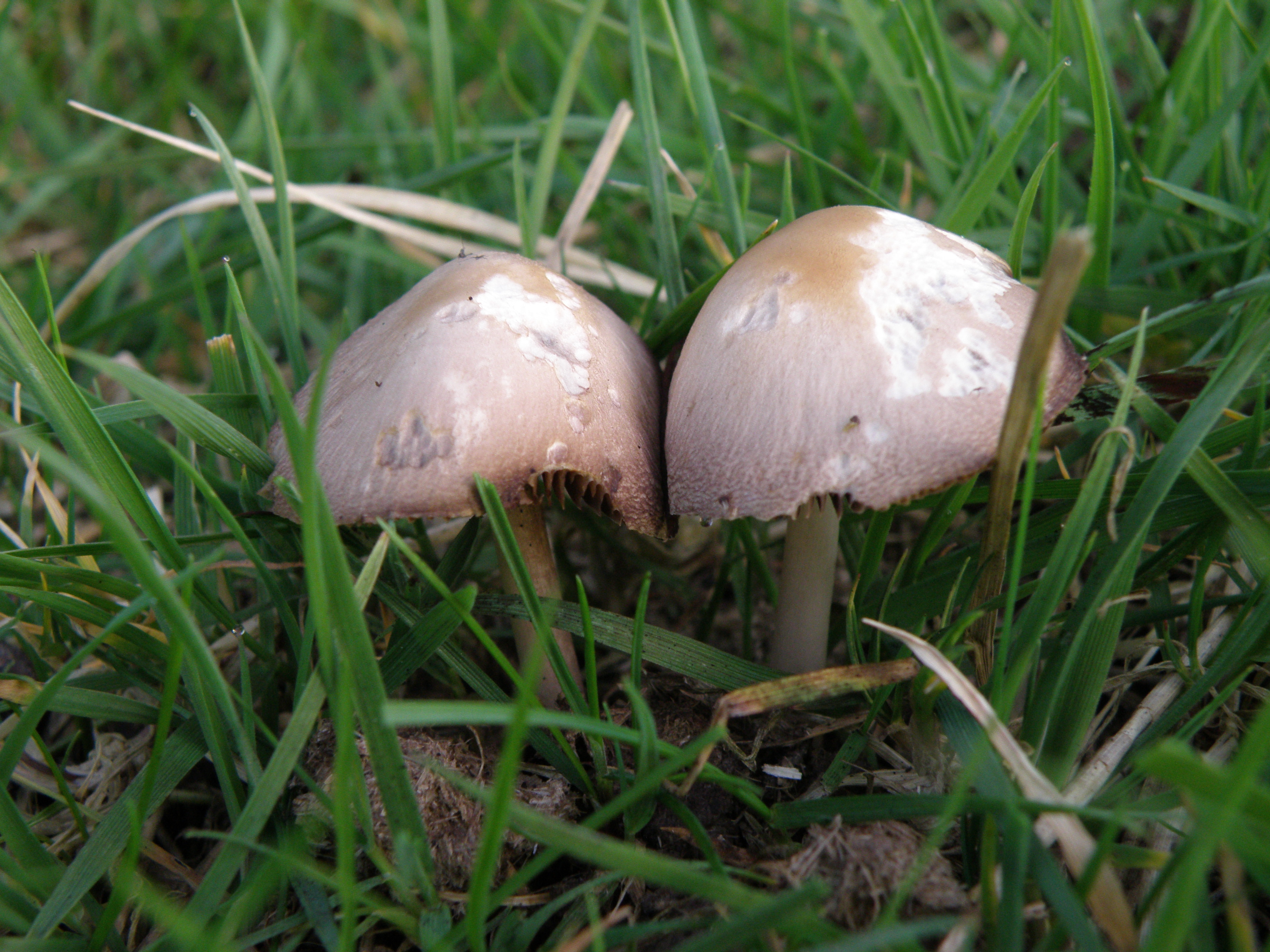
A pair of C. rickenii, growing out of dung

Conocybe rickenii grows on extremely rich soil, especially on dung and compost heaps. It can be found in very large numbers in gardens where horse manure has been used to enrich the soil. It can be found in Europe, Australia, and Pacific islands and the United States.
