= Conocybe volviradicata =

Scientific classification
- Domain: Eukaryota
- Kingdom: Fungi
- Division: Basidiomycota
- Class: Agaricomycetes
- Order: Agaricales
- Family: Bolbitiaceae
- Genus: Conocybe
- Species: C. volviradicata

Binomial name
- Conocybe volviradicata Watling, Işıloğlu & Baş Serm. (2011)

Species of fungus

Conocybe volviradicata Mycological characteristics
- Gills on hymenium
- Cap is campanulate or conical
- Hymenium is free
- Stipe has a volva
- Spore print is brown
- Ecology is saprotrophic
- Edibility is unknown

Conocybe volviradicata is a species of mushroom-producing fungus in the family Bolbitiaceae.

== Taxonomy ==
It was described in 2011 by the mycologists Roy Watling, Mustafa Işıloğlu and Hayrünisa Baş Sermenlı who classified it as Conocybe volviradicata.

It is notable as being one of the few Conocybe species which has a volva and subsequently was placed in Conocybe sect. Singerella along with the other volvate species.

== Description ==
Conocybe volviradicata is a small brown volvate mushroom.

Cap: 1.5cm wide and conical to campanulate. The surface is cinnamon to sienna brown but dries to a buff or yellowish cream colour. It is smooth and silky with a striate margin. The flesh is thin and up to 1mm in the centre. Gills: Almost free, crowded and pale ochre. Stem: 3cm long and 3mm thick with a cream colour surface and distinct striations running to the start of the volva. The base of the stem has a volva and a rooting base that is up to 2cm long. Spore print: ochre to cinnamon brown. Spores: 8-10 x 6-7 μm. Hexagonal with a distinct germ pore and thick wall. Sienna brown.

== Etymology ==
The specific epithet volviradicata is named in reference to the volvate, rooting stipe.

== Habitat and distribution ==
The specimens studied by Watling, Işıloğlu and Sermenlı were found growing on manured soil on the border of a vegetable garden in Southwest Turkey.
