= Shrivelling =

Wrinkling and contracting of an object

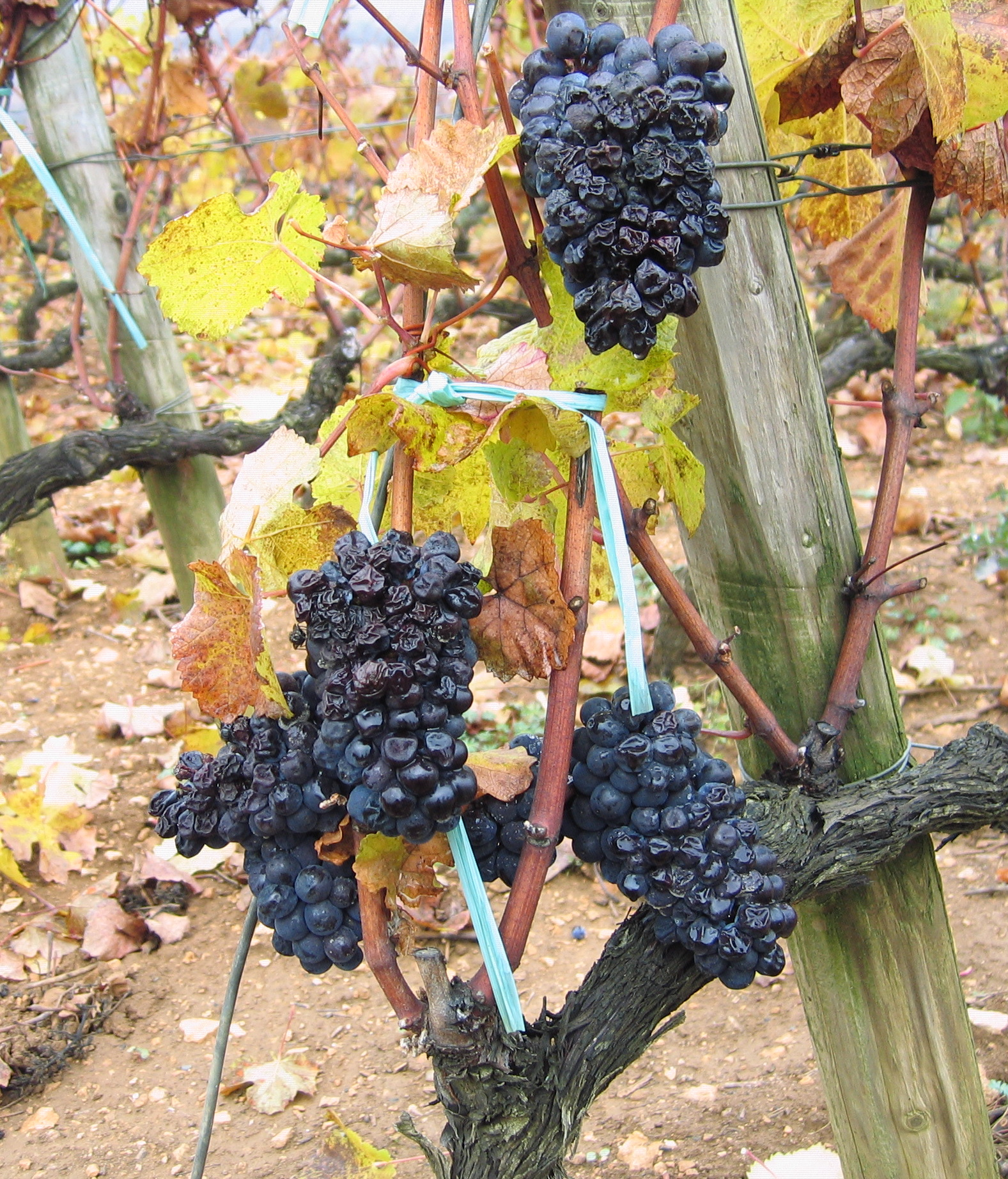
Partially shrivelled Pinot Noir grapes. Left on the vine in the vineyard les Hâtes in Burgundy (Côte de Beaune) after the main harvest.

Shrivelling is a natural phenomenon where an object, with an attached sub-elastic covering, has its interior volume reduced in some way. The covering, which cannot contract any further, is then obliged to wrinkle and buckle, in order to preserve surface area while containing the lesser volume.

== Foods ==
For example, in raisin production manufacturers shrivel grapes by drying (desiccating) them.

Shriveled squid

Sequence of images showing a peach decaying and shriveling over a period of six days

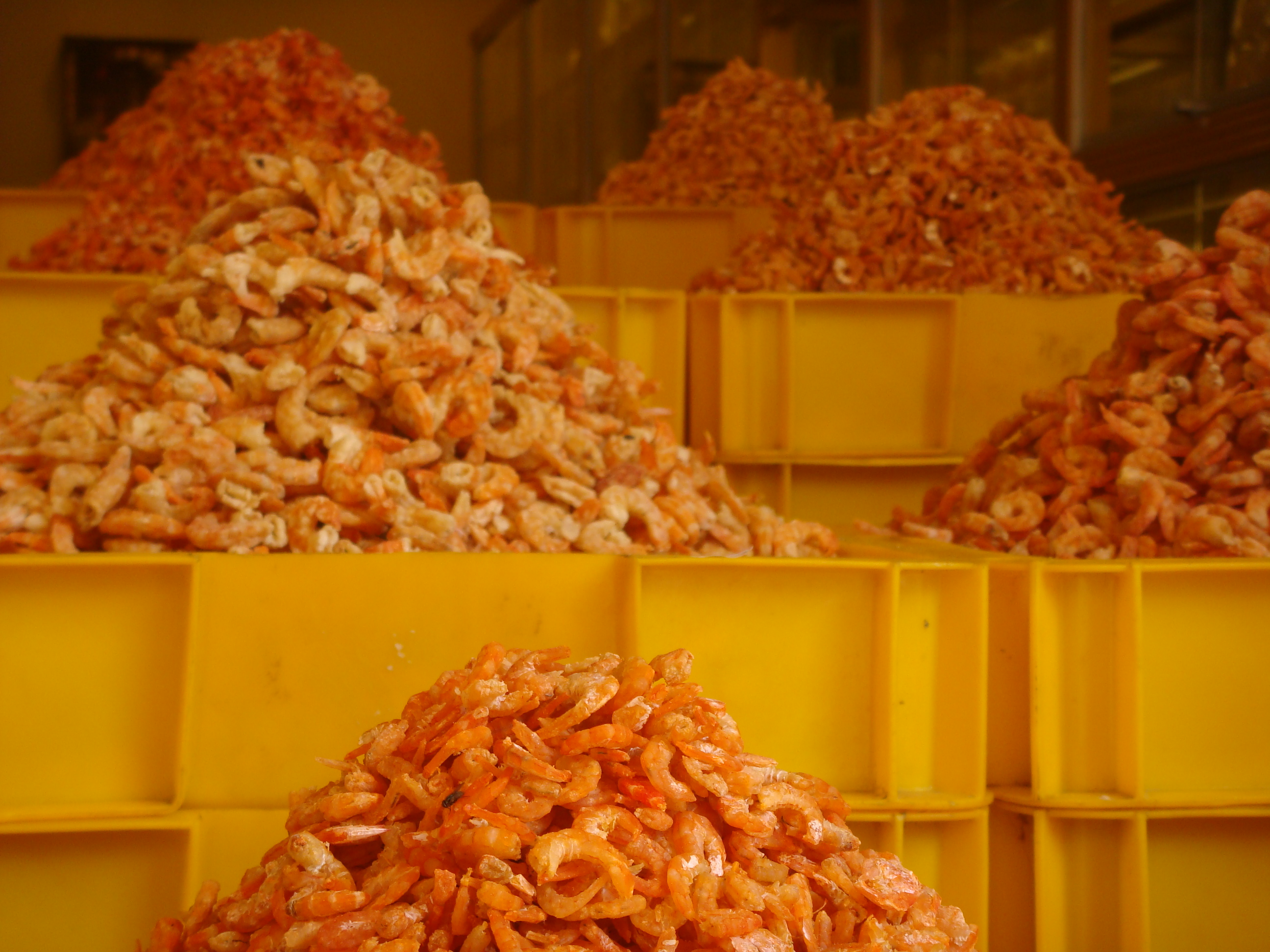
Shriveled, dried shrimp

== See also ==
- List of dried foods
- Food drying
