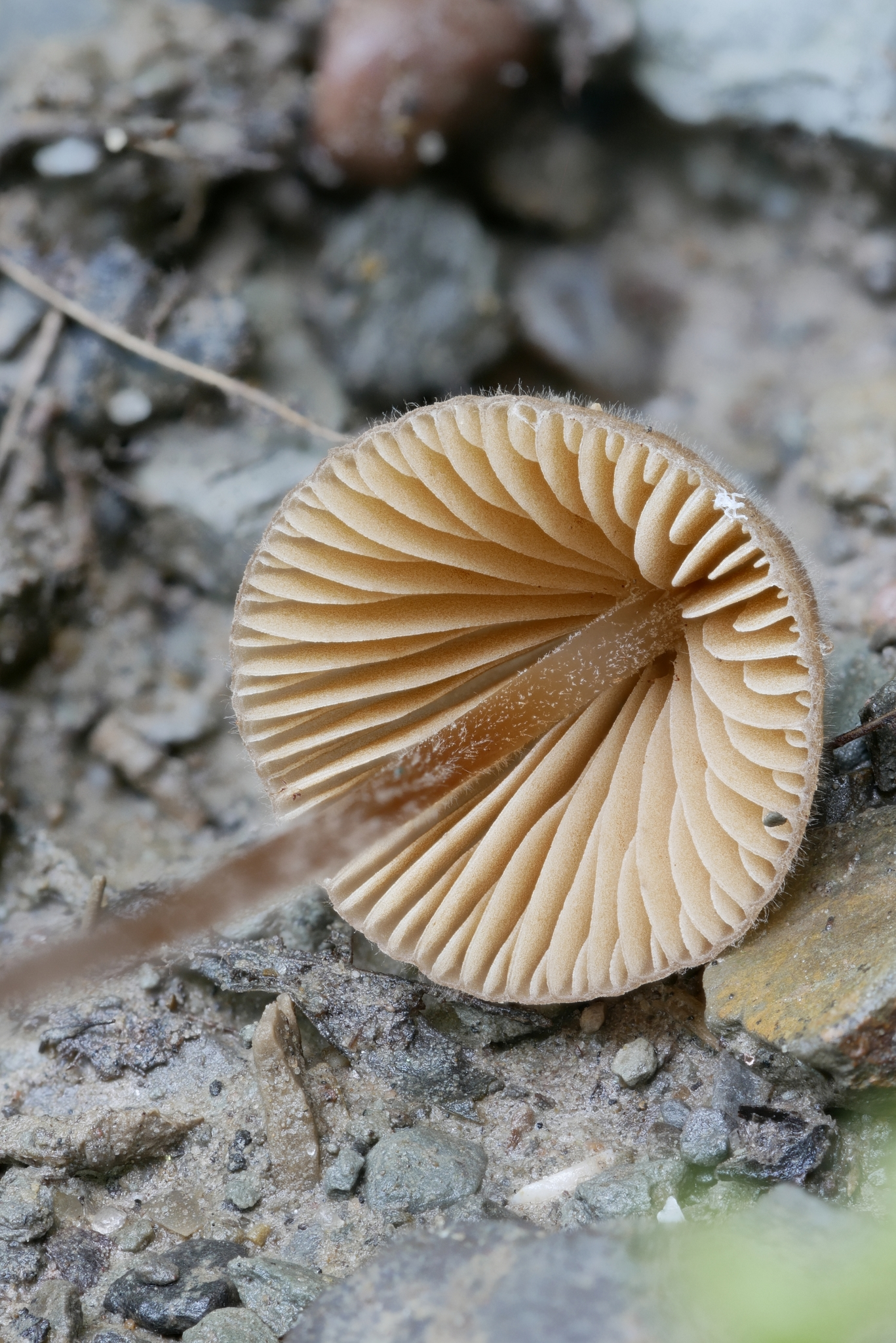

Scientific classification
- Domain: Eukaryota
- Kingdom: Fungi
- Division: Basidiomycota
- Class: Agaricomycetes
- Order: Agaricales
- Family: Bolbitiaceae
- Genus: Conocybe
- Species: C. moseri

Binomial name
- Conocybe moseri Watling (1980)

Synonyms
- Conocybe kuehneri Singer (1947)

= Conocybe moseri =

Species of fungus

Conocybe moseri is a mushroom species in the family Bolbitiaceae. It was described as new to science in 1980 by mycologist Roy Watling, from collections made in France. The specific epithet moseri honours Austrian mycologist Meinhard Moser. The fungus has been reported from the United Kingdom, growing in grassy areas, fields, and edges of woods. In 1995, it was recorded from Switzerland, from Ukraine in 2007, and from Russia in 2007. It was reported from India in 2015, where it was found growing on cattle dung.
