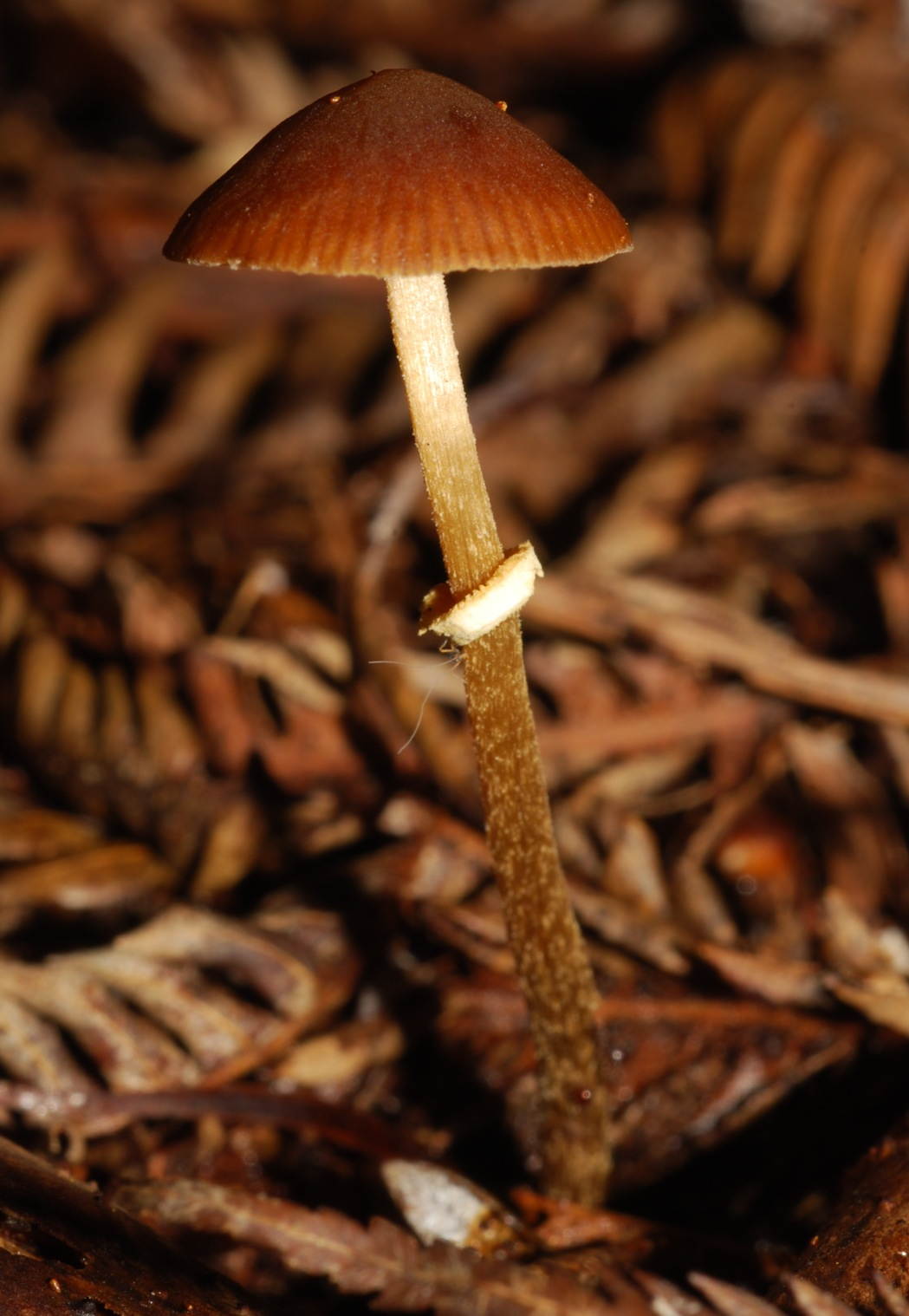

Scientific classification
- Kingdom: Fungi
- Division: Basidiomycota
- Class: Agaricomycetes
- Order: Agaricales
- Family: Bolbitiaceae
- Genus: Conocybe
- Species: C. rugosa

Binomial name
- Conocybe rugosa (Peck) Watling (1981)

Synonyms
- Pholiota rugosa Peck (1898); Pholiotina rugosa (Peck) Singer (1946); Conocybe filaris; Pholiotina filaris var. rugosa (Peck) Singer (1950)

= Conocybe rugosa =

Species of mushroom

Conocybe rugosa
- Mycological characteristics
- Gills on hymenium
- Cap is conical or flat
- Hymenium is adnexed
- Stipe has a ring
- Spore print is brown to reddish-brown
- Ecology is saprotrophic
- Edibility is deadly

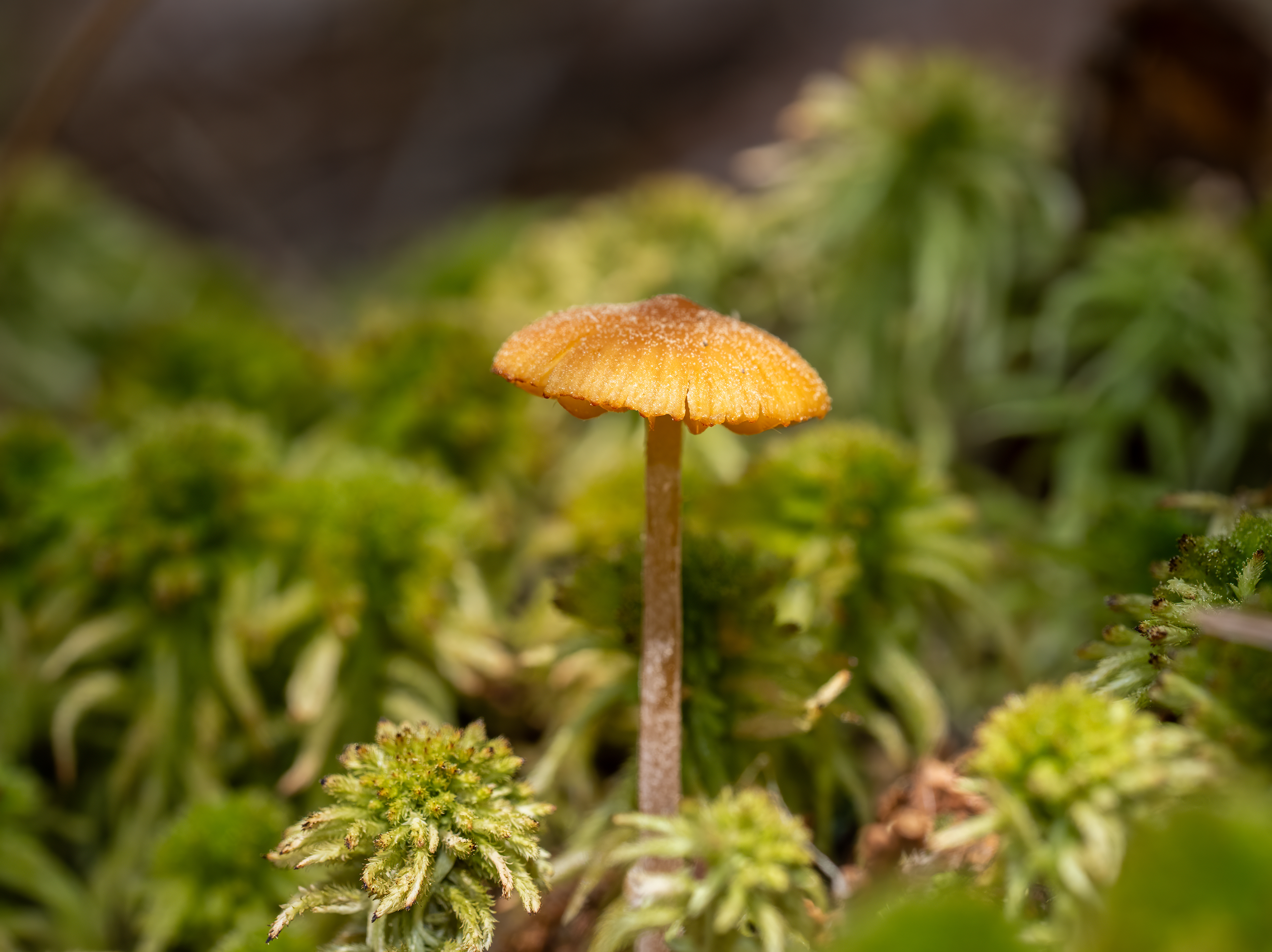
C. rugosa growing in the New Jersey Pine Barrens

Conocybe rugosa is a common and highly toxic species of mushroom that is widely distributed in Eurasia and North America.

== Taxonomy ==
The species was originally described in the genus Pholiotina, and its morphology and a study conducted in 2013 about molecular phylogenetics supported its continued classification there.

== Description ==
Conocybe rugosa has a conical cap that expands to flat, usually with an umbo. It is less than 3cm across, has a smooth brown top, and the margin is often striate. The gills are rusty brown, close, and adnexed. The stalk is 2mm thick and 1 to 6cm long, smooth, and brown, with a prominent and movable ring. The spores are rusty brown, and it may be difficult to identify the species without a microscope.

== Habitat and distribution ==
The species grows in woodchips, flowerbeds and compost piles. It has been found in Europe, Asia and North America. It is especially common in the Pacific Northwest.

== Toxicity ==
This species is deadly poisonous, as the fruiting bodies biosynthesize alpha-amanitin, a cyclic peptide that is highly toxic to the liver and is responsible for many deaths by poisoning from mushrooms in the genera Amanita and Lepiota. This fungus is sometimes mistaken for species of the genus Psilocybe.

== See also ==
- List of deadly fungi
