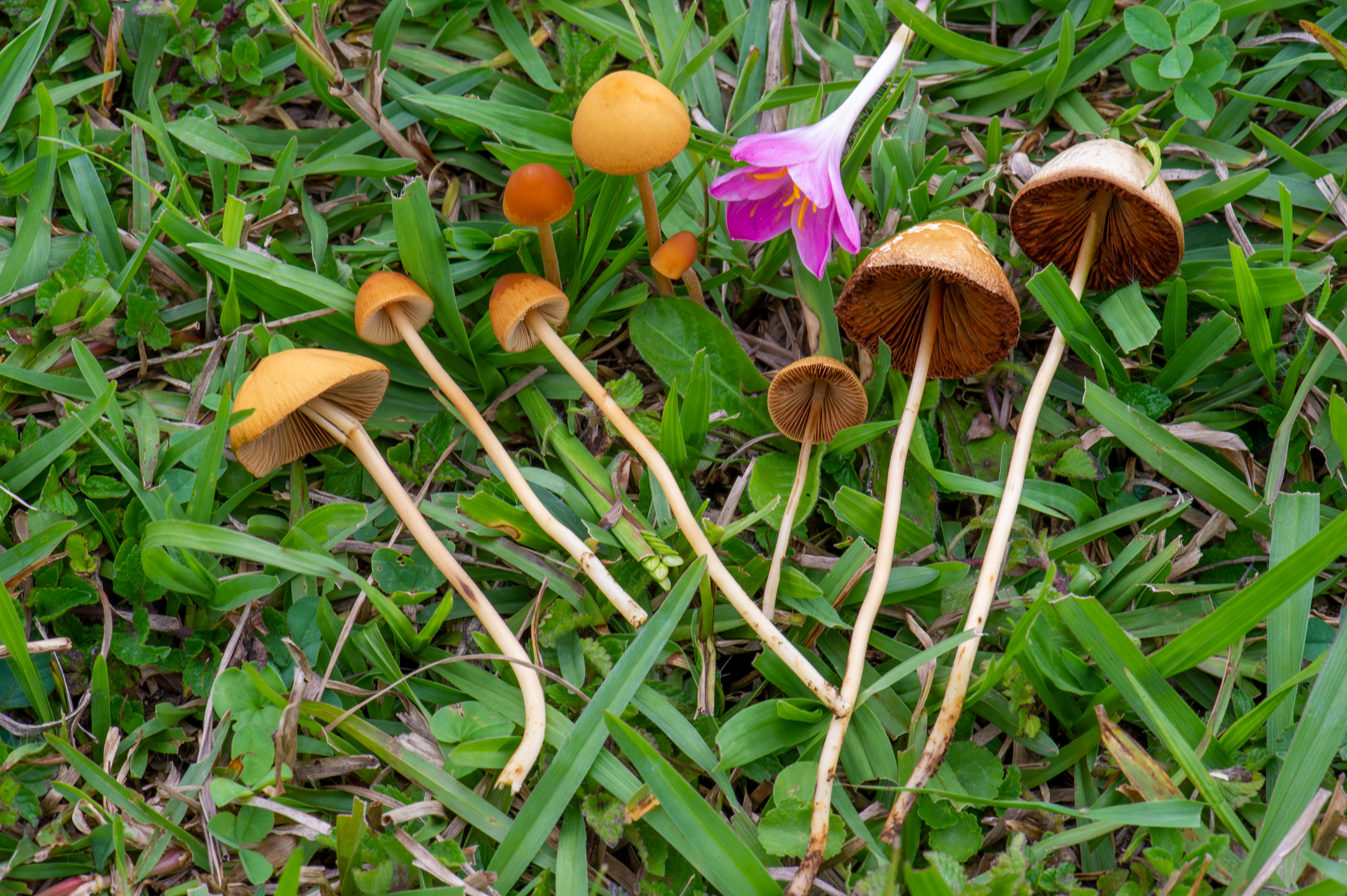

Scientific classification
- Domain: Eukaryota
- Kingdom: Fungi
- Division: Basidiomycota
- Class: Agaricomycetes
- Order: Agaricales
- Family: Bolbitiaceae
- Genus: Conocybe
- Species: C. tenera

Binomial name
- Conocybe tenera (Schaeff.) Fayod

= Conocybe tenera =

Species of fungus

Conocybe tenera Mycological characteristics
- Gills on hymenium
- Cap is conical or convex
- Hymenium is adnate
- Stipe is bare
- Spore print is brown
- Ecology is saprotrophic
- Edibility is inedible

Conocybe tenera, commonly known as the brown dunce cap or common cone head, is a widely distributed member of the genus Conocybe, for which it serves as the type species.

== Description ==
Conocybe tenera is a small saprotrophic mushroom with a conic to convex cap which is smooth and orangish brown. It is up to 2.5 centimetres (1 in) wide and is striate almost to the center. The stem is 3 to 9 cm (1 1/4 to 3 1/2 in) long, 1–4 mm thick, and is equal width for the whole length, sometimes with some swelling at the base. It lacks an annulus (ring), is hollow and pruinose near the top.

The gills are adnexed and pale brown, darkening in age. The spore print is rusty brown. The spores are yellowish brown, smooth and elliptical with a germ pore, measuring 12 x 6 μm.

=== Similar species ===
The species requires microscopy to identify. It resembles members of Galerina, Pholiotina, and Psathyrella, as well as Parasola conopilea. The related C. filaris is poisonous.

== Distribution and habitat ==
Common in disturbed areas in North America, it is widely distributed across the world.

== Edibility ==
The species is inedible, and is related to at least one species which contains the deadly amatoxin.
