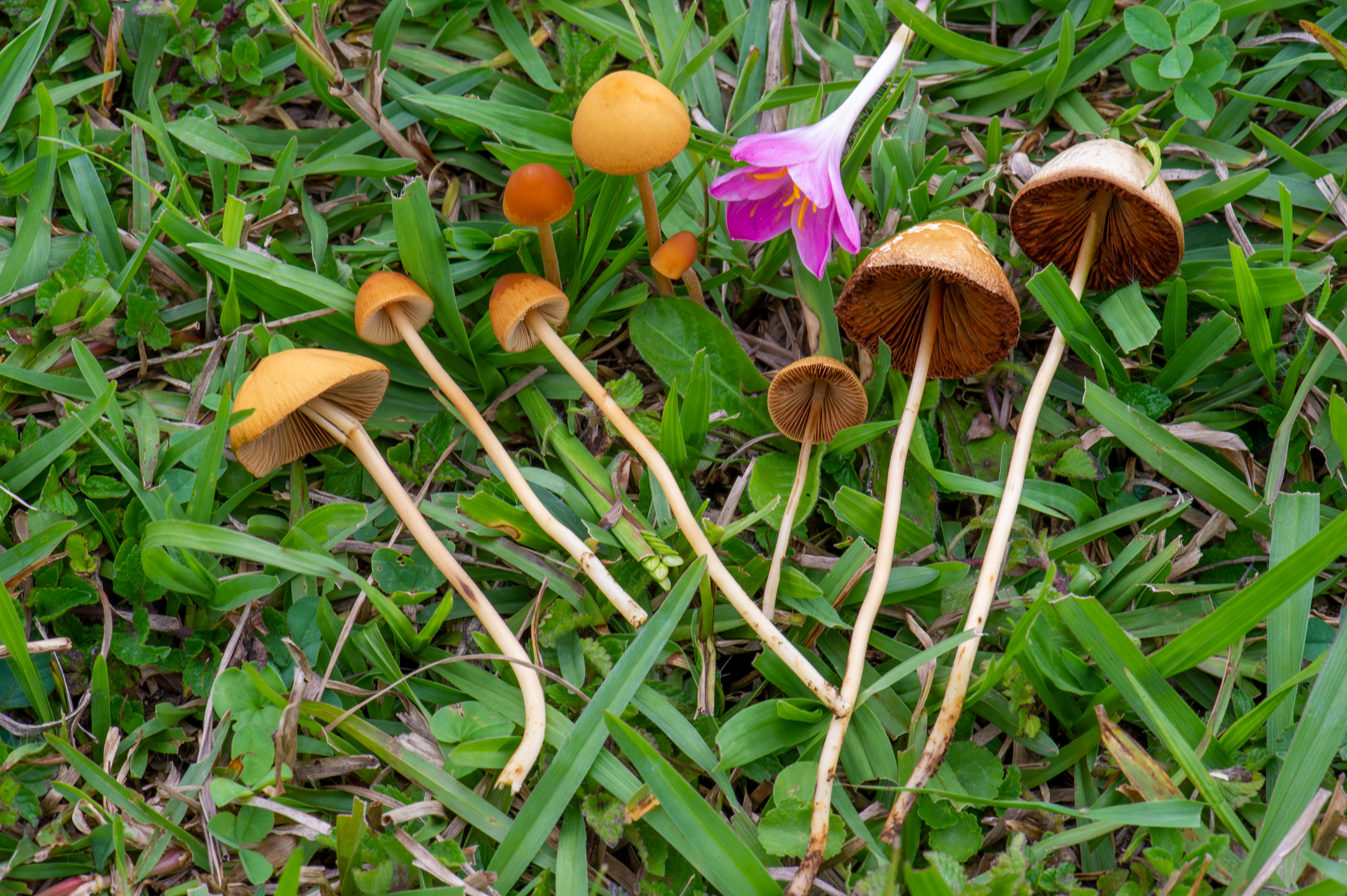
- Conocybe tenera

Scientific classification
- Kingdom: Fungi
- Division: Basidiomycota
- Class: Agaricomycetes
- Order: Agaricales
- Family: Bolbitiaceae
- Genus: Conocybe

Type species
- Conocybe tenera (Schaeff.) Fayod (1889)

Synonyms
- Gastrocybe Watling (1968); Raddetes P.Karst. (1887); Pholiotella Speg. (1889); Pseudoconocybe Hongo (1967)

= Conocybe =

Genus of fungi

Conocybe is a genus of mushrooms with Conocybe tenera as the type species and at least 243 other species. There are at least 50 different species in North America.

Most have a long, thin fragile stipe and are delicate, growing in grasslands on dead moss, dead grass, sand dunes, decayed wood, and dung. Conocybe species generally prefer fertile soils in lawns and pastures and are found worldwide. Conocybe species are sometimes called dunce caps or cone heads due to their conical or bell-shaped caps. Former species of Conocybe that have a well-developed partial veil and/or lack lecythiform cheilocystidia have been transferred to the genus Pholiotina, which was formerly a subgenus of Conocybe. However, Pholiotina as it is currently defined is polyphyletic, although none of the three clades that make it up belong in Conocybe. Similar to Galerina, a Conocybe species can be distinguished microscopically by its cellular cap cuticle, which is filamentous (thread-like) in Galerina. It is easy to confuse Conocybe species for Galerina species unless the microscopic nature of the cap cuticle is examined. Conocybe species have cap cuticles resembling cobblestones. Conocybe species can also be mistaken for species of Bolbitius.

Four species of Conocybe that are known to contain the hallucinogenic compounds psilocin and psilocybin are C. kuehneriana, C. siligineoides, C. cyanopus, and C. smithii. Conocybe siligineoides was used for shamanic purposes by the Mazatecs of Oaxaca.

Conocybe rugosa are somewhat common mushrooms that contain the deadly toxic cyclic peptide alpha-amanitin.

Conocybe comes from the Greek cono meaning cone shaped and cybe meaning head.

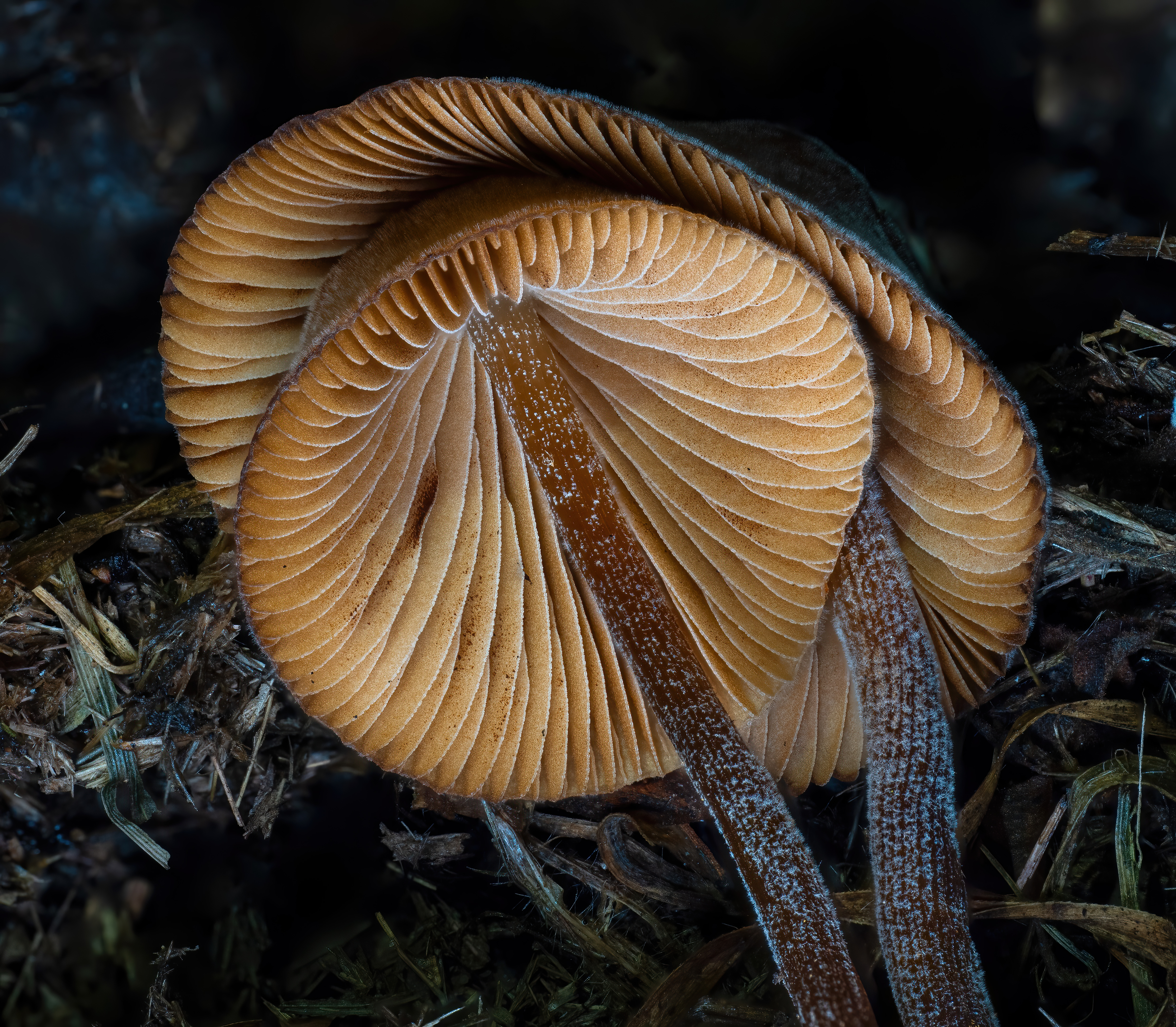
Conocybe cf. coprophila underside

== Selected species ==
- Conocybe apala
- Conocybe aurea
- Conocybe coprophila (coprophilous)
- Conocybe cyanopus (psychoactive)
- Conocybe elegans
- Conocybe farinacea (coprophilous)
- Conocybe filaris (highly toxic)
- Conocybe kuehneriana (psychoactive)
- Conocybe moseri
- Conocybe pubescens (coprophilous)
- Conocybe reticulata
- Conocybe rickenii
- Conocybe siligineoides (psychoactive)
- Conocybe smithii (psychoactive)
- Conocybe tenera (type species)
- Conocybe volviradicata

== Legal status ==
=== United States ===
==== Louisiana ====
Except for ornamental purposes, growing, selling or possessing Conocybe spp. (and Psilocybe spp.) is prohibited by Louisiana State Act 159.

== See also ==
- List of Agaricales genera
