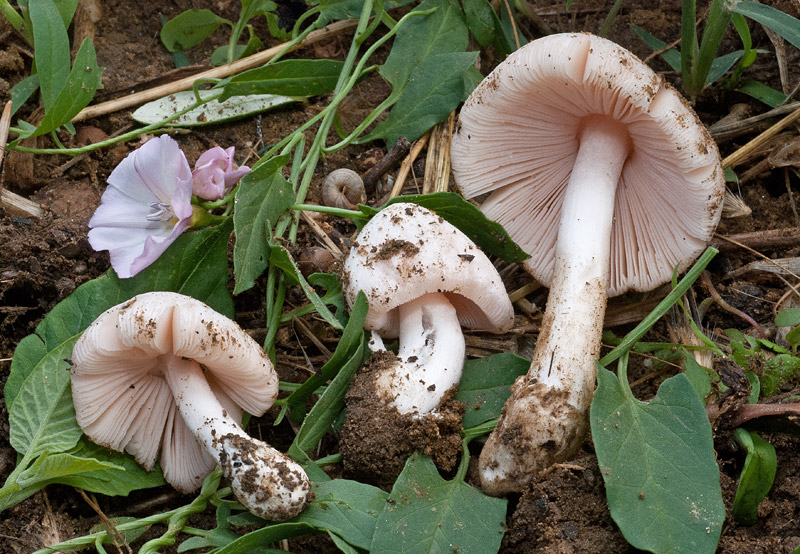

Scientific classification
- Kingdom: Fungi
- Division: Basidiomycota
- Class: Agaricomycetes
- Order: Agaricales
- Family: Pluteaceae
- Genus: Volvopluteus
- Species: V. earlei

Binomial name
- Volvopluteus earlei (Murrill) Vizzini, Contu & Justo (2011)

Synonyms
- Volvariopsis earlei Murrill (1911); Volvaria earlei (Murrill) Murrill (1912); Volvariella earlei (Murrill) Shaffer (1957)

= Volvopluteus earlei =

Species of fungus

Volvopluteus earlei
- Mycological characteristics
- Gills on hymenium
- Cap is ovate or flat
- Hymenium is free
- Stipe has a volva
- Spore print is pink to pinkish-brown
- Ecology is saprotrophic
- Edibility is unknown

Volvopluteus earlei is a species of mushroom in the family Pluteaceae. It was originally described in 1911 by American mycologist William Alphonso Murrill as Volvariopsis earlei, based on collections made in a Cuban banana field. The fungus was later shuffled to the genera Volvaria and Volvariella before molecular studies placed it in Volvopluteus, a genus newly described in 2011.

The cap of Volvopluteus earlei is typically between 2.5–5 cm (1–2 in) in diameter, white, and is markedly viscid when fresh. The gills start out as white but they soon turn pink. The stipe is white and measures 5 cm (2 in) long and 1 cm (0.4 in) wide. It has a smooth, white, sac-like volva at its base. The cap produces a pinkish-brown spore print made of individual elliptical spores measuring up to 11 micrometers long. A saprotrophic fungus that grows on grassy fields, V. earlei has been reported from Africa, Europe, and North America. Microscopic features and DNA sequence data are of great importance for separating this taxon from related species. V. earlei can be distinguished from the three other Volvariella by differences in the size of the fruit bodies, cap color, spore size, and the presence or absence and form of cystidia.

== Taxonomy ==
This species was originally described by American mycologist William Alphonso Murrill in 1911 based on three collections made by his colleague Franklin Sumner Earle in Santiago de las vegas (Cuba) a few years earlier. It was originally described by Murrill in the genus Volvariopsis, created in the same publication, because at that time there was considerable confusion about which generic name was more appropriate for the mushrooms traditionally classified in the genus Volvariella. At the time of Murrill's proposal most species in this group were classified in the genus Volvaria erected by Paul Kummer in 1871, but mycologists realized that the name Volvaria was already taken as it had been coined by Augustin Pyramus de Candolle for a genus of lichens in 1805. A year later Murrill transferred his species of Volvariopsis to the genus Volvaria, citing practical concerns about usage of names for non-taxonomists: "A number of species of gill-fungi described by me from tropical America in Mycologia, 1911–1912, under genera not found in Saccardo's Sylloge, are here recombined for the benefit of those having or using herbaria arranged according to this work. Collectors, pathologists, and others who may not be intimately acquainted with taxonomic methods will probably find it more convenient to follow the one system until a comprehensive revision is completed, at least for some important groups".

- - Volvopluteus gloiocephalus
  - - Volvopluteus earlei
    - - Volvopluteus asiaticus
      - Volvopluteus michiganensis

Phylogenetic relationships between Volvopluteus earlei and related species as inferred from ITS data.

Ultimately, neither Volvaria nor Volvariopsis would be used as the correct name for this group. The generic name Volvariella, proposed by the Argentinean mycologist Carlos Luis Spegazzini in 1899, would be adopted for this group in 1953 after a proposal to conserve Kummer's Volvaria against De Candolle's Volvaria was rejected by the Nomenclature Committee for Fungi established under the principles of the International Code of Nomenclature for algae, fungi, and plants. The combination Volvariella earlei would be made by Robert L. Shaffer, who authored the first comprehensive monographic revision of Volvariella in North America in 1957.

The phylogenetic study of Alfredo Justo and colleagues showed that Volvariella earlei is closely related to Volvariella gloiocephala and that this group of species constitutes a separate lineage from the majority of the species traditionally classified in Volvariella. Therefore, this taxon was transferred to the newly proposed genus Volvopluteus. The specific epithet earlei comes from the surname of Franklin Sumner Earle, the collector of the original samples, to whom Murrill dedicated the species. The original specimens of this species are still preserved at the herbarium of the New York Botanical Garden.

== Description ==
The cap of Volvopluteus earlei is between 25 and 50 mm (1.0 and 2.0 in) in diameter, more or less ovate or hemispherical when young, then expanding to convex or flat. It can have a low, broad umbo in the center in old specimens; the surface is markedly viscid in fresh fruit bodies; the cap is pure white, but sometimes develops pale brown tinges with age. The gills are crowded together, free from attachment to the stipe, ventricose, and up to 6 mm broad; they are white when young but turn pink with age as the spores mature. The cylindrical stipe is 30–50 mm (1.2–2.0 in) long and 2–10 mm (0.1–0.4 in) wide, and broadening towards the base. Its surface is white, smooth or slightly pruinose (as if covered with a fine white powder). The sac-like volva is up to 20 mm (0.8 in) high, white and has a smooth surface. The context is white in the stipe and cap and it does not change color when bruised or exposed to air. The smell and taste of the flesh are described as indistinct or herbaceous. The spore print is pinkish-brown.

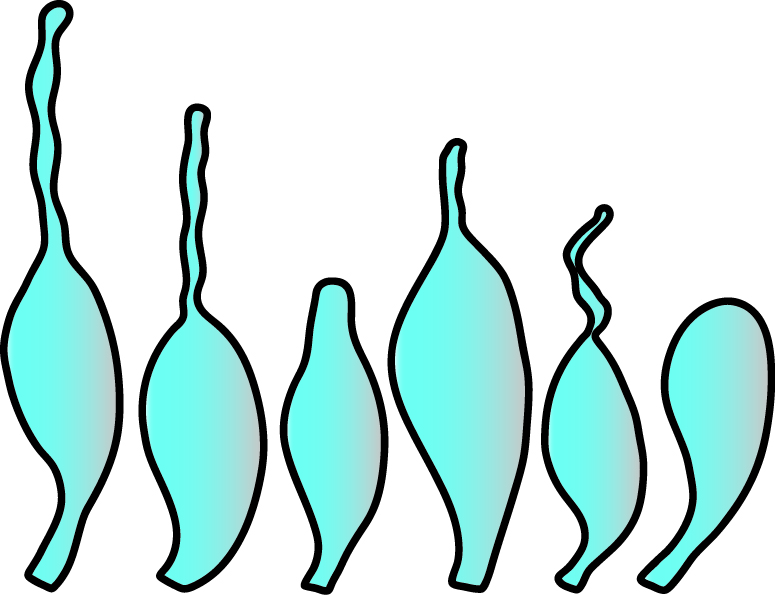
The cheilocystidia of Volvopluteus earlei are variably shaped and often have a long apical outgrowth.

The spores are ellipsoid and measure 11–16 by 8–11 μm. Basidia are 20–40 by 8–16 μm; they are usually four-spored but sometimes two-spored, and, more rarely, one-spored forms can occur. Pleurocystidia (cystidia on the gill face) are absent in most collections; if present they are scarce and similar to the cheilocystidia. Cheilocystidia (cystidia on the gill edge) measure 30–70 by 10–35 μm, and are club-, spindle-, or flask-shaped, and usually each one has an apical outgrowth up to 40 μm long. The cheilocystidia completely cover the gill edge. In the form acystidiatus (N.C.Pathak) Vizzini & Contu, both pleurocystidia and cheilocystidia are completely absent. The cap cuticle (pileipellis) is an ixocutis (parallel hyphae embedded in a gelatinous matrix). The stipe cuticle (stipitipellis) is a cutis (parallel hyphae not embedded in a gelatinous matrix). Caulocystidia (cystidia on the stem) are sometimes present; they measure 65–140 by 10–25 μm, and are mostly cylindrical.

== Habitat, distribution, and ecology ==
Volvopluteus earlei is a saprotrophic mushroom that grows in gardens and grassy fields. It was originally found in banana fields in Cuba. In Africa, Spain and Italy it has been reported mostly in urban or anthropogenic garden areas. It usually fruits in groups of several mushrooms but it can also be found growing solitary. This species has been reported from Cuba, North Carolina, Mexico, Spain and Italy. Molecular data have so far corroborated that the European and African collections correspond to the same species.

== Similar species ==
Molecular analyses of the internal transcribed spacer region clearly separate the four species currently recognized in Volvopluteus, but morphological identification can be more difficult due to the sometimes overlapping morphological variation among the species. Size of the fruit bodies, color of the cap, spore size, presence or absence of cystidia and morphology of the cystidia are the most important characters for morphological species delimitation in the genus. Volvopluteus gloiocephalus has larger fruit bodies (cap more than 5 cm (2 in) in diameter), has pleurocystidia, and the cheilocystidia lack long apical outgrowths. V. asiaticus has pleurocystidia and has predominantly flask-shaped cheilocystidia without long apical outgrowths. In V. michiganensis, pleurocystidia are also present, and this species has smaller spores, typically less than 12.5 μm long.
