= Volvopluteus michiganensis =

Scientific classification
- Domain: Eukaryota
- Kingdom: Fungi
- Division: Basidiomycota
- Class: Agaricomycetes
- Order: Agaricales
- Family: Pluteaceae
- Genus: Volvopluteus
- Species: V. michiganensis

Binomial name
- Volvopluteus michiganensis (A.H.Sm.) Justo & Minnis (2011)
- Washtenaw County in Michigan, where the species was originally found

Synonyms
- Pluteus michiganensis A.H.Sm. (1934)

Species of fungus

Volvopluteus michiganensis Mycological characteristics
- Gills on hymenium
- Cap is ovate or flat
- Hymenium is free
- Stipe has a volva
- Spore print is pink to pinkish-brown
- Ecology is saprotrophic
- Edibility is unknown

Volvopluteus michiganensis is a species of mushroom in the family Pluteaceae. It was originally described under the name Pluteus michiganensis but molecular studies have placed it in the Volvopluteus, a genus described in 2011. The cap of this mushroom is about 7–9 cm (2.8–3.5 in) in diameter, gray, and has a cracked margin that is sticky when fresh. The gills start out as white but they soon turn pink. The stipe is white and has a volva at the base. Microscopical features and DNA sequence data are of great importance for separating this taxon from related species. V. michiganensis is a saprotrophic fungus that was originally described as growing on sawdust. It has only been reported from Michigan (US) and the Dominican Republic.

== Taxonomy ==
- - V. gloiocephalus
  - - V. earlei
    - - V. asiaticus
      - V. michiganensis

Phylogenetic relationships between Volvopluteus michiganensis and related species as inferred from ITS data.

This species was originally described by American mycologist Alexander H. Smith in 1934 as Pluteus michiganensis, based on collections made in Ann Arbor in October 1932. In the original description there is no mention of a volva at the base of the stipe, one of the morphological characters separating Pluteus from Volvopluteus. Smith did mention that "the large spores are unusual for the genus Pluteus". The species then disappeared from the mycological literature of the 20th century and Smith did not include his own species when he revised the type collections of North American Pluteus. Morphological revision of the type and DNA sequence data (based on Internal transcribed spacer sequences) obtained from the collection confirmed that this taxon belongs in the genus Volvopluteus, and that it is a separate species from all the other members of that genus.

The epithet michiganensis refers to the state of Michigan, where the fungus was originally described. The original holotype specimens of this species are preserved at the University of Michigan Herbarium.

== Description ==
=== Macroscopic characters ===
The cap of Volvopluteus michiganensis is between 7 and 9 cm (2.8 and 3.5 in) in diameter, more or less ovate or conical when young, then expands to convex or flat. It can have low, broad umbo at center in old specimens; the surface is markedly viscid in fresh basidiocarps and covered with radially arranged fibrills; the cap is ash gray, similar to the color of Tricholoma terreum. The gills are crowded, free from the stipe, ventricose, up to 1.5 cm (0.6 in) broad; white when young turning pink with age. The stipe is 8–11 cm (3.1–4.3 in) long and 1–1.5 cm (0.4–0.6 in) wide, club-shaped with a bulbous base; the surface is white, smooth or tomentose. The volva is sac-like, white and has a smooth surface. The context is white in the stipe and cap and it does not change when bruised or exposed to air. The smell was recorded as "earthy, fragrant"; the taste was not recorded. The spore print color was not recorded, but it is assumed to be pinkish-brown.

=== Microscopic characters ===
The basidiospores are 10.5–13.5 by 6.5–8 μm with an ellipsoid shape. The basidia (spore-bearing cells) are 35–55 by 10–15 μm, and four-spored. Pleurocystidia (cystidia on the gill faces) are 70–110 by 25–45 μm, fusiform (spindle-shaped), utriform (shaped like a leather bottle) or lageniform (flask shaped); some have an apical excrescence (outgrowth). Cheilocystidia (cystidia on the gill edge) are 60–75 by 15–27 μm, commonly fusiform or utriform; they cover completely the gill edge. The cap cuticle is an ixocutis (parallel hyphae embedded in a gelatinous matrix). The stipitipellis is a cutis (parallel hyphae not embedded in a gelatinous matrix). Caulocystidia (cystidia on the stipe surface) are sometimes present, and they are 100–360 by 10–20 μm and mostly cylindrical.

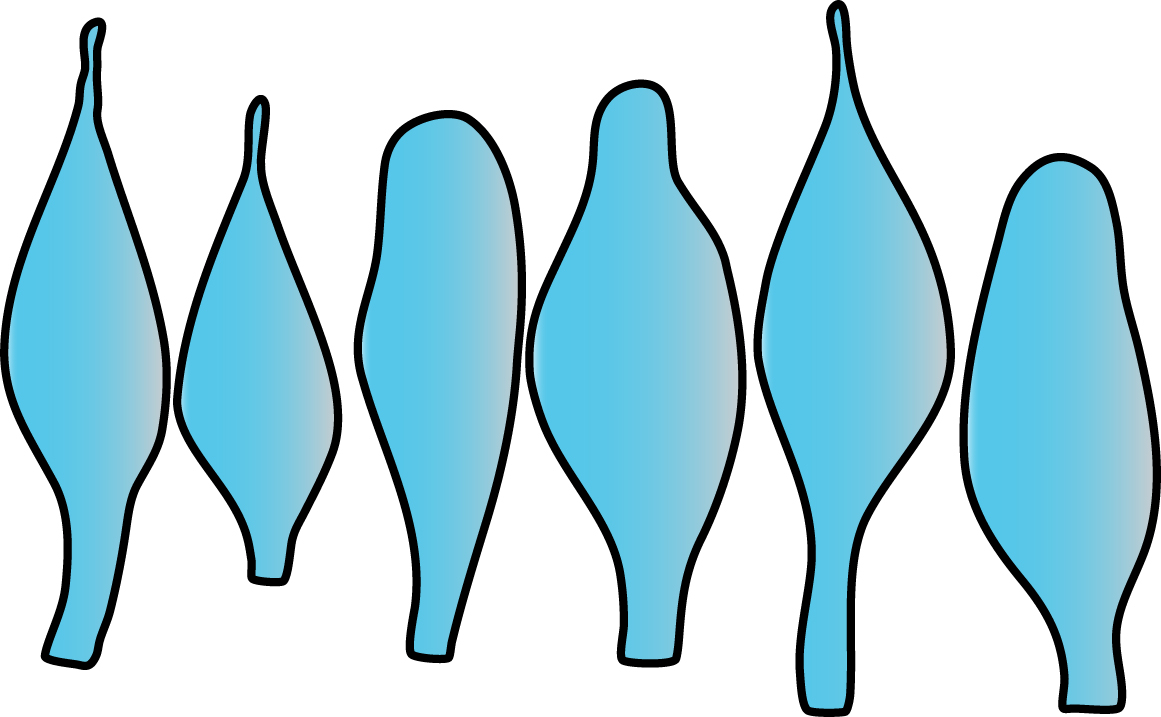
Pleurocystidia

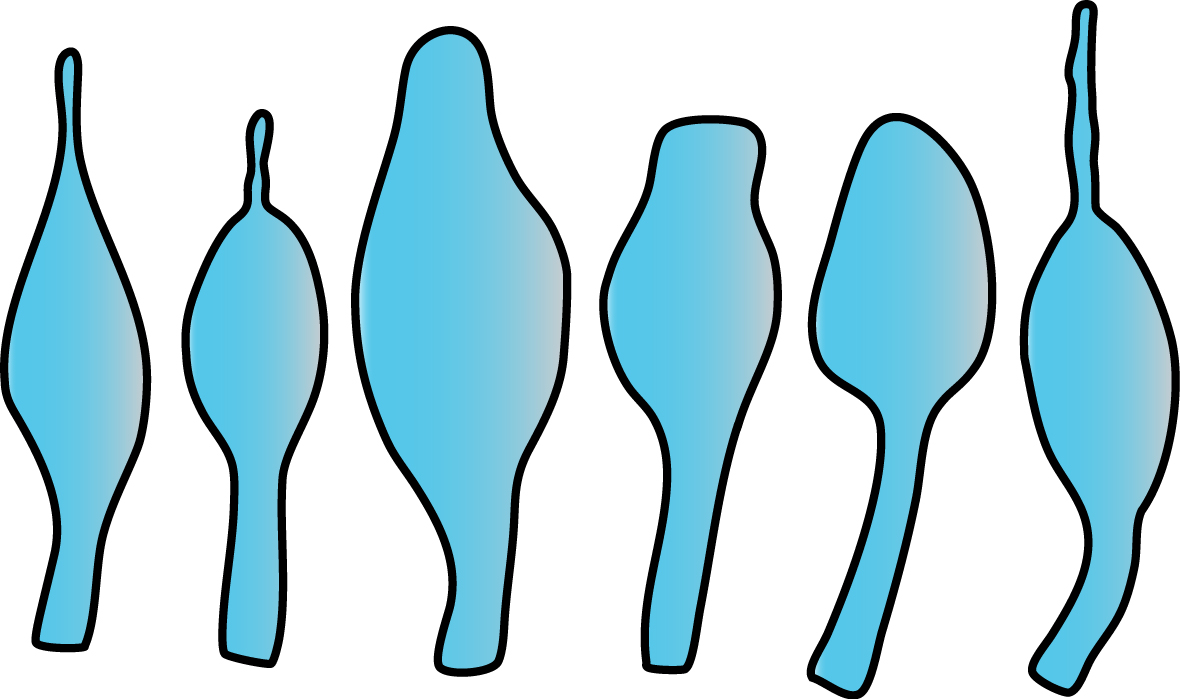
Cheilocystidia

=== Ecology and distribution ===
Volvopluteus michiganensis is a saprotrophic mushroom. The type collection was collected on sawdust. The collections from the Dominican Republic were collected on piles of vegetable matter.

This species is only known from the type locality (Ann Arbor) and a second locality in the Dominican Republic. Morphologically, the Dominican collection matches the type collection well, but no molecular comparison has been performed.

== Similar species ==
Molecular analyses of the internal transcribed spacer region clearly separate the four species currently recognized in Volvopluteus but identification can be more difficult due to the sometimes overlapping morphological variation among the species. Size of the fruit bodies, color of the cap, spore size, presence or absence of cystidia and morphology of the cystidia are the most important characters for morphological species delimitation in the genus. Volvopluteus michiganensis is distinguished from other species of Volvopluteus by its relatively shorter spores, measuring on average less than 12.5 μm long.
