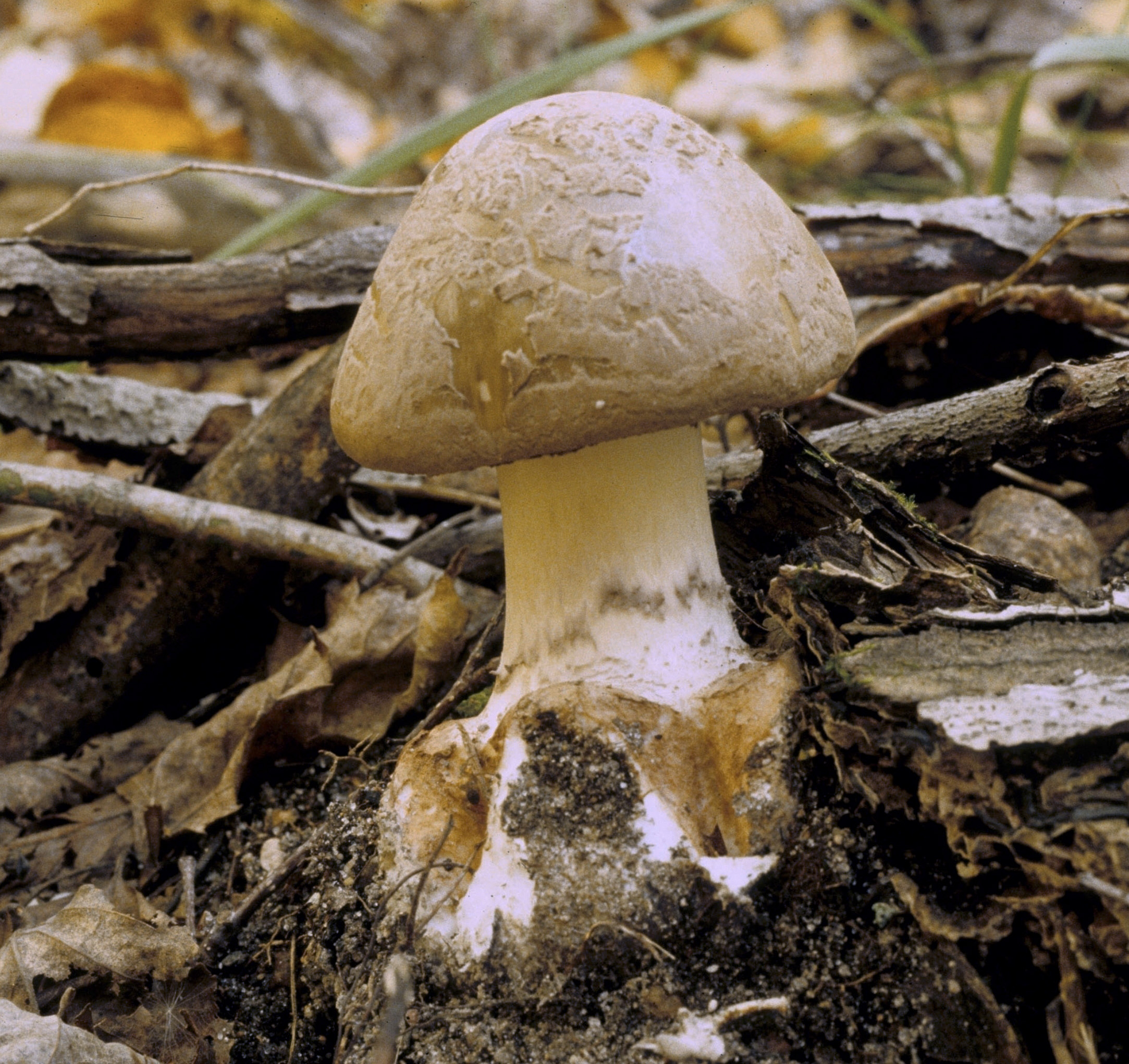

Scientific classification
- Domain: Eukaryota
- Kingdom: Fungi
- Division: Basidiomycota
- Class: Agaricomycetes
- Order: Agaricales
- Family: Amanitaceae
- Genus: Amanita
- Species: A. brunnescens

Binomial name
- Amanita brunnescens G.F.Atk. (1918)

= Amanita brunnescens =

Brown star-footed amanita

Species of fungus

Amanita brunnescens Mycological characteristics
- Gills on hymenium
- Cap is convex
- Hymenium is free
- Stipe has a ring and volva
- Spore print is white
- Ecology is mycorrhizal
- Edibility is unknown

Amanita brunnescens, also known as the brown American star-footed amanita or cleft-footed amanita is a native North American mushroom of the large genus Amanita. It differs from A. phalloides (the death cap) by its fragile volva and tendency to bruise brown.

== Taxonomy ==
Originally presumed to be the highly toxic Amanita phalloides (the death cap) by renowned American mycologist Charles Horton Peck, it was described and named by George F. Atkinson of Cornell University. He named it after the fact that it bruised brown.

== Description ==
Amanita brunnescens has a mostly brown cap, with possible tones of olive, grey, or red. At maturity the cap is often around 8–9 centimetres (3 1/4–3 1/2 inches) wide. The cap margins lack universal veil remnants. The shape of the cap can be bell-shaped to convex, becoming planar as it matures. The flesh within the cap is mostly white or cream and can bruise brown. The characteristic Amanita gills are free from the stipe and white. The stipe is also white, with a smooth basal bulb that distinctly splits into a "cleft-foot". It stains reddish-brown on the lower half, especially when handled, and averages about 9 cm tall. A partial veil is present, often white with possible brown coloration. There is no volva, but there may be volval remnants if the fruiting body is excavated carefully, that are white to brownish.

The odor, if present, is of raw potatoes. a piece of the stipe may need to be cut in order to detect the faint scent.

The spore print is white, and "the spores measure (7.0-) 8.0–9.2 (-9.5) × (6.5-) 7.2–8.5 (-9.2) μm and are globose to subglobose (occasionally broadly ellipsoid) and amyloid. Clamps are absent from bases of basidia."

=== Variations ===
Amanita brunnescens var. pallida is almost identical to the description above, but with a white cap color.

=== Similar species ===
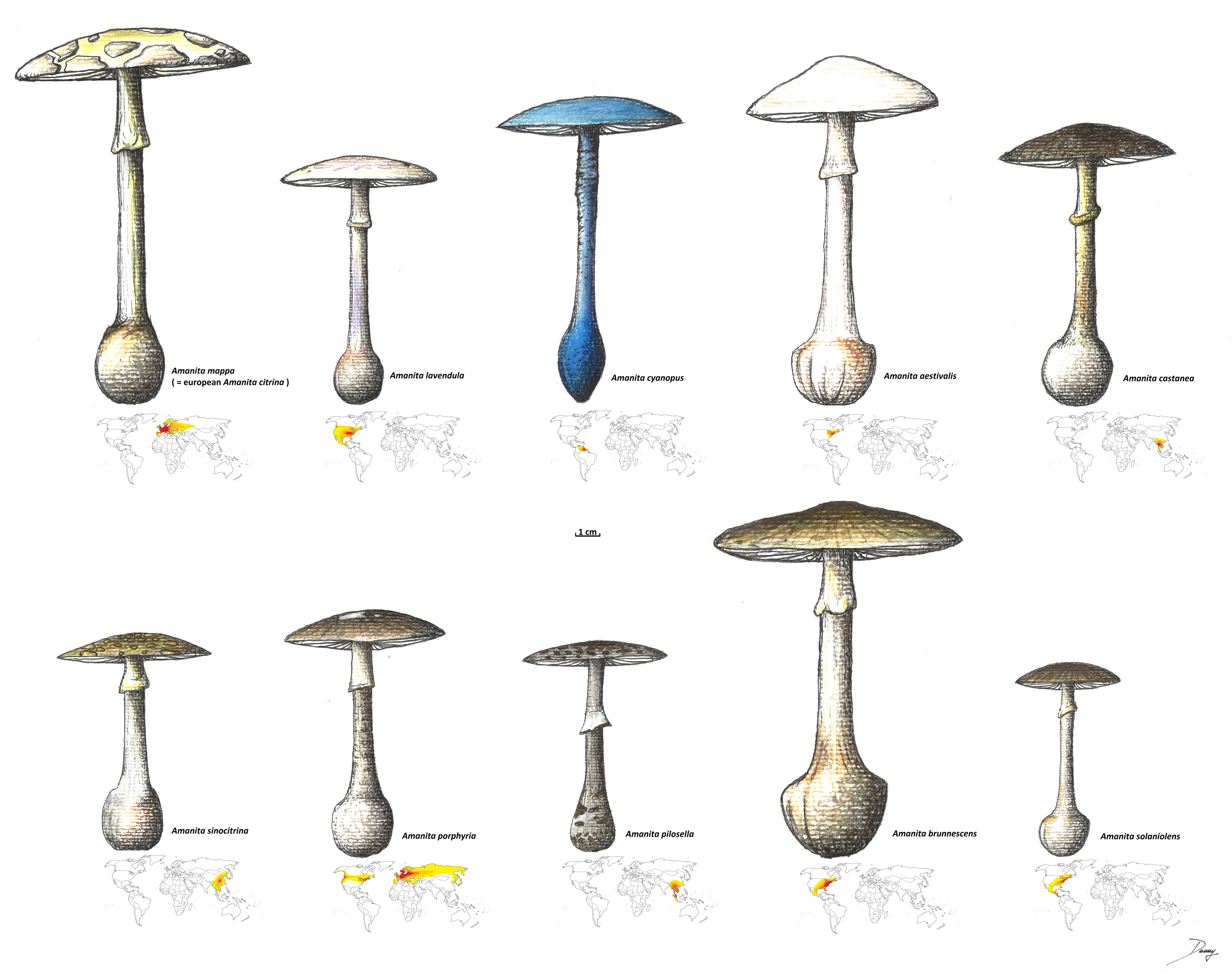
A. brunnescens (bottom, second from right) compared to other species

A. brunnescens' most distinguishing features are the characteristic Amanita stature with warts and partial veil, as well as the cleft foot and reddening base.

Successful mushroom identification relies on the collection of mature, healthy and undamaged specimens. Amanitas can be separated from other agarics by their (usually) tall and slender stature, presence of universal veil remnants and/or a volva, and sometimes a partial veil. Other genera with volvas include Volvariella and Volvopluteus which will never have a partial veil or universal veil remnants on the cap. Those genera also have pink spore prints instead of Amanita's white.

Section Validae, to which A. brunnescens belongs, can be distinguished from other Amanita sections via the smooth bulbous base without a volva, stipe with a partial veil, and no veil remnants hanging off of cap margin. Other Amanita sections have either a conspicuous volva or a concentric/scaly stipe base.

Amanita amerirubescens has an indistinct (sometimes a little swollen) stipe base, a brassy yellow to reddish cap, and when young, yellowish warts on cap. This species also reddens.

Amanita flavorubens is similar to A. amerirubescens, but has a yellower cap and warts that retain their yellow color for longer.

Amanita asteropus is the European version of A. brunnescens.

== Toxicity ==
It is of unknown edibility and may be poisonous.

== See also ==
- List of Amanita species
