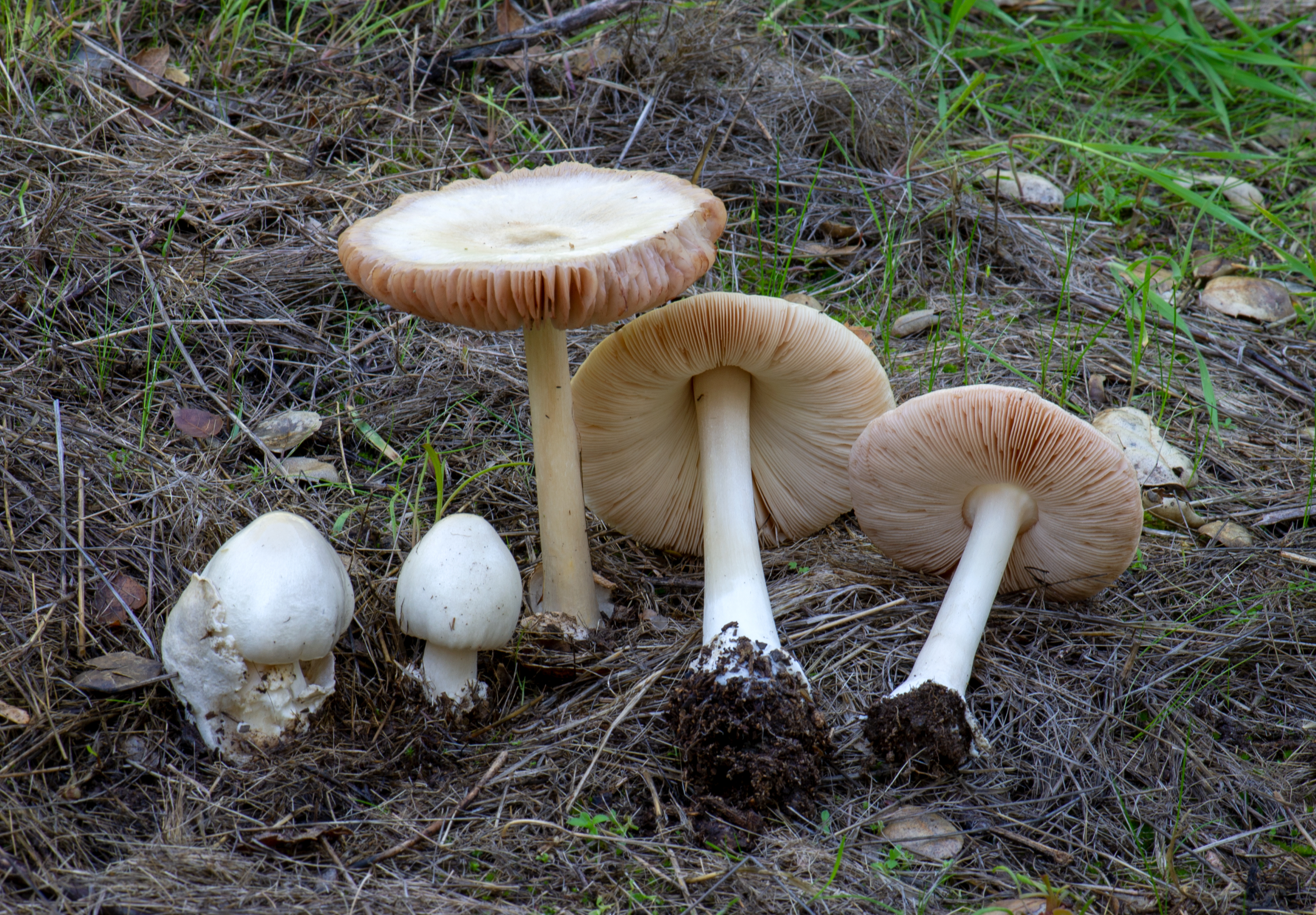

Scientific classification
- Kingdom: Fungi
- Division: Basidiomycota
- Class: Agaricomycetes
- Order: Agaricales
- Family: Pluteaceae
- Genus: Volvopluteus
- Species: V. gloiocephalus

Binomial name
- Volvopluteus gloiocephalus (DC.) Vizzini, Contu & Justo (2011)

Synonyms
- Volvariella speciosa (Fr.) P.Kumm. (1871); Volvariella gloiocephala (Fr.) Gillet (1876)

= Volvopluteus gloiocephalus =

Species of mushroom

Volvopluteus gloiocephalus
- Mycological characteristics
- Gills on hymenium
- Cap is ovate or flat
- Hymenium is free
- Stipe has a volva
- Spore print is pink to pinkish-brown
- Ecology is saprotrophic
- Edibility is edible but not recommended

Volvopluteus gloiocephalus, commonly known as the big sheath mushroom, rose-gilled grisette, or stubble rosegill, is a species of mushroom in the family Pluteaceae. For most of the 20th century it has been known under the names Volvariella gloiocephala or V. speciosa, but recent molecular studies have placed it as the type species of the genus Volvopluteus, newly created in 2011.

The cap of the mushroom is about 5–15 cm (2–6 in) in diameter, varies from white to grey or grey-brown, and is markedly sticky when fresh. The gills start out as white but they soon turn pink. The stipe is white and has a sack-like volva at the base. Microscopical features and DNA sequence data are of great importance for separating V. gloiocephalus from related species. V. gloiocephalus is a saprotrophic fungus that grows on grassy fields and accumulations of organic matter like compost or woodchip piles. It has been reported from all continents except Antarctica.

== Taxonomy ==
- - Volvopluteus gloiocephalus
  - - Volvopluteus earlei
    - - Volvopluteus asiaticus
      - Volvopluteus michiganensis

Phylogenetic relationships between Volvopluteus gloiocephalus and related species as inferred from ITS data.

This taxon has a long and convoluted nomenclatural history. It was originally described as Agaricus gloiocephalus by Swiss botanist Augustin Pyramus de Candolle in 1815 and later sanctioned under this name by Elias Magnus Fries in 1821. The French mycologist Claude Gillet transferred it in 1878 to the genus Volvaria erected by Paul Kummer just a few years earlier in 1871. The name Volvaria was already taken, as it had been coined by De Candolle for a genus of lichens in 1805. The generic name Volvariella, proposed by the Argentinean mycologist Carlos Luis Spegazzini in 1899, would eventually be adopted for this group in 1953 after a proposal to conserve Kummer's Volvaria against De Candolle's Volvaria was rejected by the Nomenclature Committee for Fungi established under the principles of the International Code of Botanical Nomenclature.

Despite the generic name Volvariella being adopted in 1953 the name Volvariella gloiocephala did not exist until 1986, when the placement of the species in that genus was formally proposed by mycologists Teun Boekhout and Manfred Enderle. The reason for this long interval is that most 20th-century mycologists working on Volvariella (e.g. Rolf Singer, Robert L. Shaffer, Robert Kühner, Henri Romagnesi) considered the epithet "gloiocephalus" to represent a variety with dark basidiocarps of another species of Volvariella, viz. Volvariella speciosa, that has white basidiocarps, and therefore would use the name Volvariella speciosa var. gloiocephala to refer to this taxon. Boekhout & Enderle showed that white and dark basidiocarps can arise from the same mycelium, and that the epithets "gloiocephalus" proposed by De Candolle in 1815 and "speciosa" proposed by Fries in 1818 should be considered to represent the same species with the former having nomenclatural priority. In 1996 Boekhout and Enderle designated a neotype to serve as a representative example of the species.

The phylogenetic study of Justo and colleagues showed that Volvariella gloiocephala and related taxa are a separate clade from the majority of the species traditionally classified in Volvariella and therefore another name change was necessary, now as the type species of the newly proposed genus Volvopluteus.

The epithet gloiocephalus comes from the Greek terms gloia (γλοία = glue or glutinous substance) and kephalē (κεφαλή = head) meaning "with a sticky head" making reference to the viscid cap surface. It is commonly known as the "big sheath mushroom", "rose-gilled grisette" or the "stubble rosegill".

== Description ==
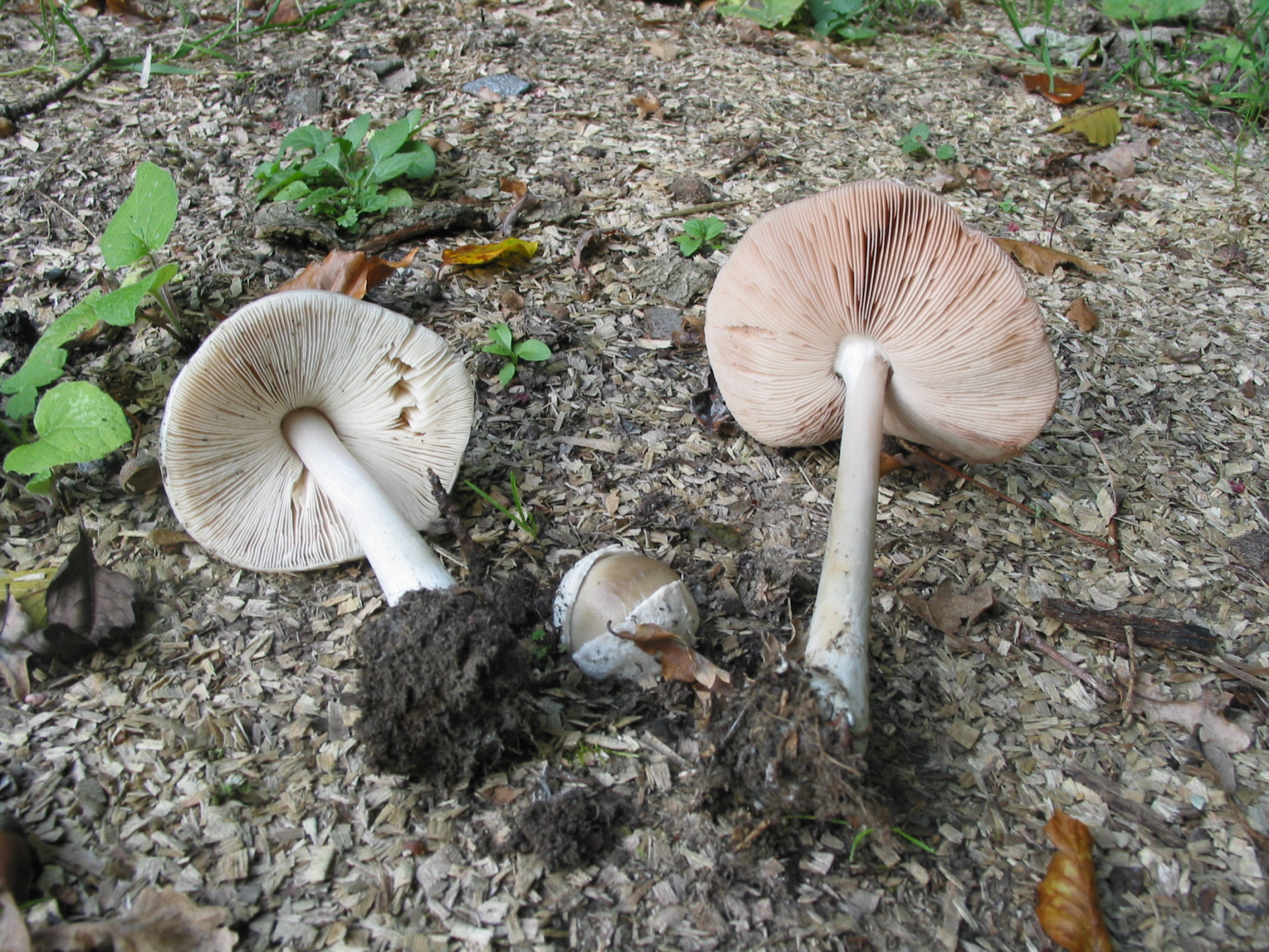
Young and mature specimens

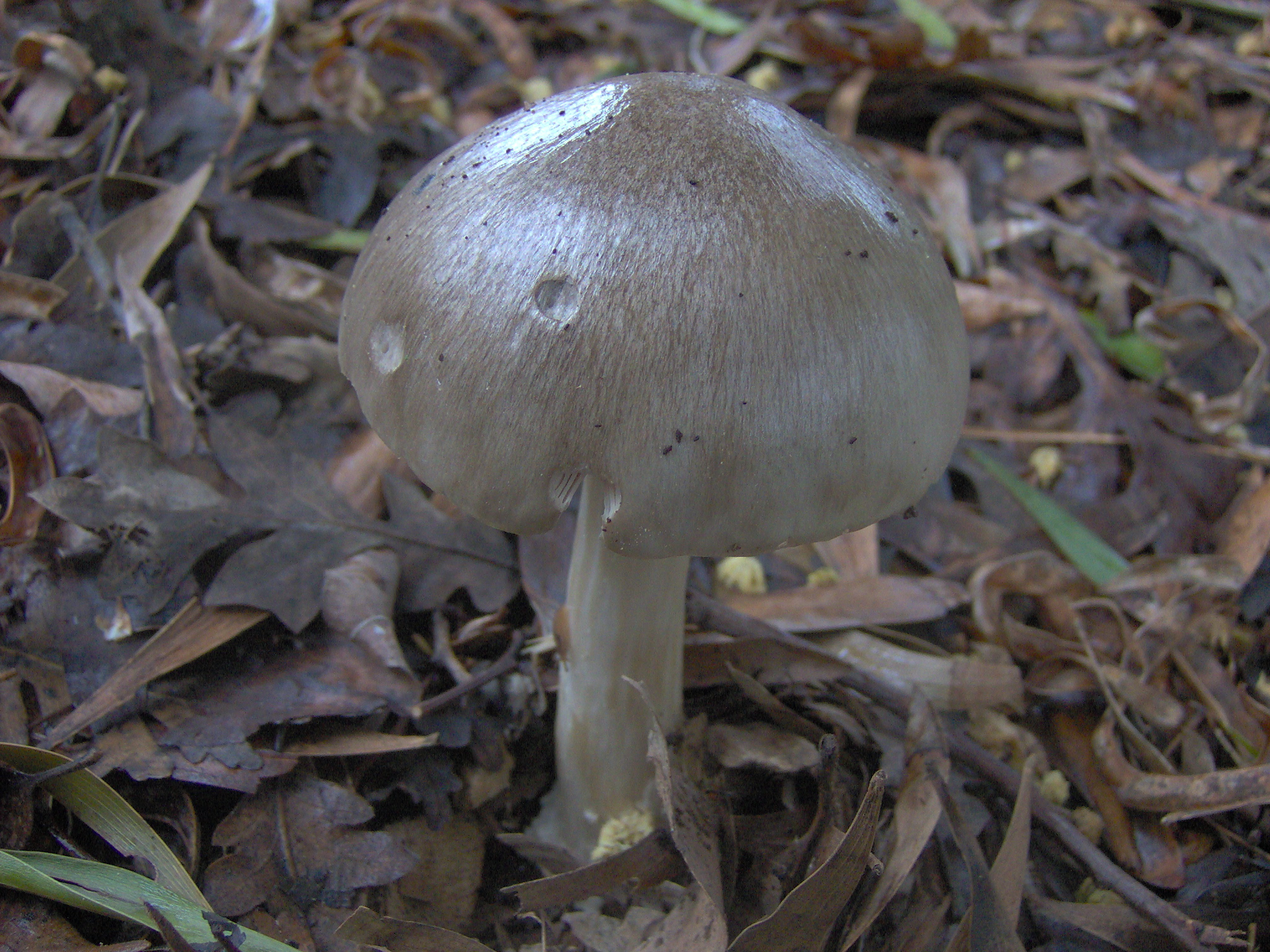
Fruit body with grey cap

The cap of V. gloiocephalus is between 5 and 15 cm (2 and 6 in) in diameter, more or less ovate or conical when young, then expands to convex or flat, sometimes with a slight central depression in old specimens. The surface is markedly viscid in fresh basidiocarps; the color ranges from pure white to grey or greyish brown. The gills are crowded, free from the stipe, ventricose (swollen in the middle), and up to 2 cm (0.8 in) broad; they are white when young but turn pink with age. The stipe is 5–22.5 cm (2–9 in) long and 0.7–2.5 cm (0.3–1.0 in) wide, cylindrical, broadening towards the base; the surface is white, smooth or slightly pruinose (covered with fine white powdery granules). The volva is 2–3 cm (0.8–1.2 in) high, sacciform (pouch-like), white and has a smooth surface. The flesh is white on stipe and cap and it does not change when bruised or exposed to air. Smell and taste vary from indistinct to raphanoid (radish-like) or similar to raw peeled potatoes. The spore print is pinkish brown.

The basidiospores are ellipsoid and measure 12–16 by 8–9.5 μm. Basidia are 20–35 by 7–15 μm and usually four-spored, but sometimes two-spored basidia can occur. Pleurocystidia are 60–90 by 20–50 μm with variable morphology: club-shaped, fusiform, ovoid, and sometimes with a small apical papilla. Cheilocystidia are 55–100 by 15–40 μm with similar morphology to the pleurocystidia; they completely cover the gill edge. The cap cuticle (pileipellis) is an ixocutis (parallel hyphae wide embedded in a gelatinous matrix). Stipitipellis is a cutis (parallel hyphae not embedded in a gelatinous matrix). Caulocystidia are sometimes present, measuring 70–180 by 10–25 μm; they are mostly cylindrical. Clamp connections are absent from the hyphae.

Microscopy
Basidiospores; small divisions are 1 μm	Pleurocystidia	Cheilocystidia

=== Similar species ===
Molecular analyses of the internal transcribed spacer region clearly separate the four species currently recognized in Volvopluteus, but morphological identification can be more difficult due to the sometimes overlapping morphological variation among the species. Size of the fruit bodies, color of the cap, spore size, presence or absence of cystidia and morphology of the cystidia are the most important characters for morphological species delimitation in the genus. V. earlei has smaller fruit bodies (cap less than 5 cm (2 in) in diameter), has no pleurocystidia (usually), and the cheilocystidia usually have a very long apical excrescence (outgrowth). In V. asiaticus the majority of the pleurocystidia have an apical excrescence up to 10–15 μm long and the cheilocystidia are predominantly lageniform (flask-shaped). V. michiganensis has smaller basidiospores, on average less than 12.5 μm long. Volvariella acystidiata, known from central Africa (Zaire) and Italy, can be distinguished by its smaller fruit bodies, with caps up to 3 cm (1.2 in) in diameter, and, microscopically, by the complete absence of cheilo- and pleurocystidia. Additionally, Volvariella taylori and Volvariella volvacea are similar.

== Habitat and distribution ==
Volvopluteus gloiocephalus is a saprotrophic mushroom that grows on the ground in gardens, grassy fields, both in and outside forest areas, and on accumulations of vegetable matter like compost or woodchip piles. It has also been reported fruiting in greenhouses. In China, it grows in bamboo thickets. It usually fruits in groups of several basidiocarps but it can also be found growing solitary. It is not unusual for a season of "spectacular" fruiting to be followed by several years with no appearance of the mushroom.

This species has been reported from all continents except Antarctica, usually under names such as Volvariella gloiocephala or V. speciosa. Molecular data have so far corroborated its occurrence in Europe and North America but records from other continents remain unconfirmed.

== Uses ==
Volvopluteus gloiocephalus is edible, although considered watery and poor in quality. It was once sold in markets in Perth, Australia. Mature fruit bodies, collected in sufficient quantity, can be used to prepare soup, or added to dishes where wild mushrooms are used, such as stews and casseroles. The mushrooms are best used fresh as they do not preserve well. Young specimens of V. gloiocephalus have white gills so it is possible to mistake them for an Amanita and vice versa. In the United States, there have been several cases of Asian immigrants collecting and eating death caps (Amanita phalloides), under the mistaken assumption that they were Volvariella. A Greek study determined the nutritional composition of fruit bodies: protein 1.49 g/100 g fresh weight (fw), 18.36 g/100 g dry weight (dw); fat 0.54 g/100 g fw, 6.65 g/100g dw; carbohydrates 5.33 g/100g fw, 65.64 g/100 g dw.
