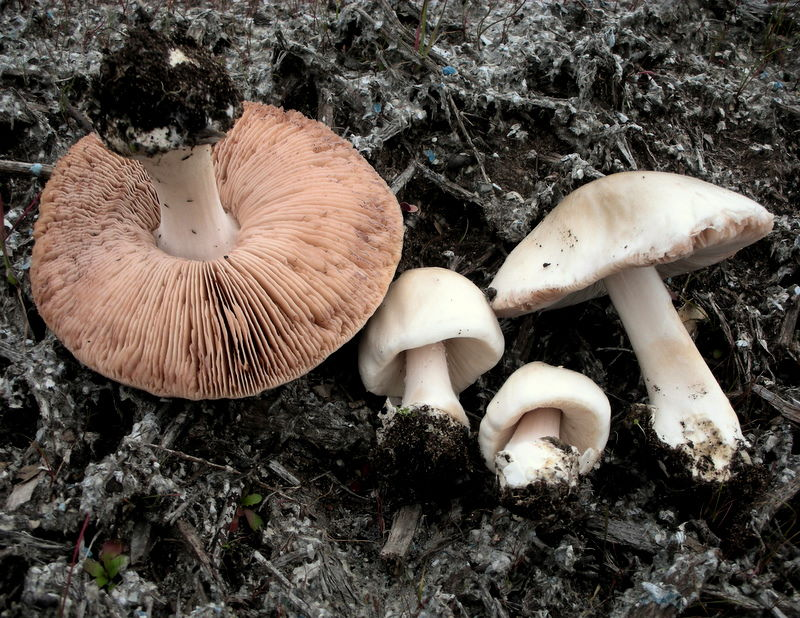
- Volvopluteus gloiocephalus

Scientific classification
- Kingdom: Fungi
- Division: Basidiomycota
- Class: Agaricomycetes
- Order: Agaricales
- Family: Pluteaceae
- Genus: Volvopluteus; Vizzini, Contu & Justo, (2011)

Type species
- Volvopluteus gloiocephalus (DC.) Vizzini, Contu & Justo (2011)

Species
- V. asiaticus V. earlei V. gloiocephalus V. michiganensis

= Volvopluteus =

Genus of fungi

Volvopluteus
- Mycological characteristics
- Gills on hymenium
- Cap is ovate or flat
- Hymenium is free
- Stipe has a volva
- Spore print is pink to pinkish-brown
- Ecology is saprotrophic
- Edibility is edible, but unpalatable or unknown

Volvopluteus is a genus of small to medium-sized or big saprotrophic mushrooms growing worldwide. The genus has been segregated from Volvariella with which it shares some morphological characteristics such as the presence of a volva and a pink to pink-brown spore print. Phylogenetic analyses of DNA data have shown that Volvopluteus is closely related to Pluteus and both genera currently are classified in the family Pluteaceae, while Volvariella is not closely related to either genus and its position in the Agaricales is still uncertain.

== Etymology ==
Volvopluteus literally means "Pluteus with a volva", making reference at the same time to the close relationship between both genera and to the presence of a volva, one of the morphological characteristics that separates them.

== Description ==
=== Macroscopic characters ===
Volvopluteus fruit bodies vary from relatively small (cap 25 mm (1.0 in) in diameter) to large (cap 150 mm (5.9 in) in diameter), are pluteoid (i.e. with free lamellae and discontinuous context of cap and stipe) and have a membranous white volva at the base of the stipe. The cap is ovate when young and then expands to convex or flat, it is always viscid to gelatinous when fresh and has white, grey or grey-brown color. The gills are free from the stipe and they start out as white but they soon change to pink and then pinkish-brown as the spores are being produced. The stipe is centrally attached to the cap, more or less cylindrical, white and with a smooth or slightly pruinose surface and it has white membranous volva at the base. The odor and taste are often reported as raphanoid (radish-like) or similar to that of raw potatoes in V. gloiocephalus. The spore print is pink or pinkish-brown.

=== Microscopic characters ===
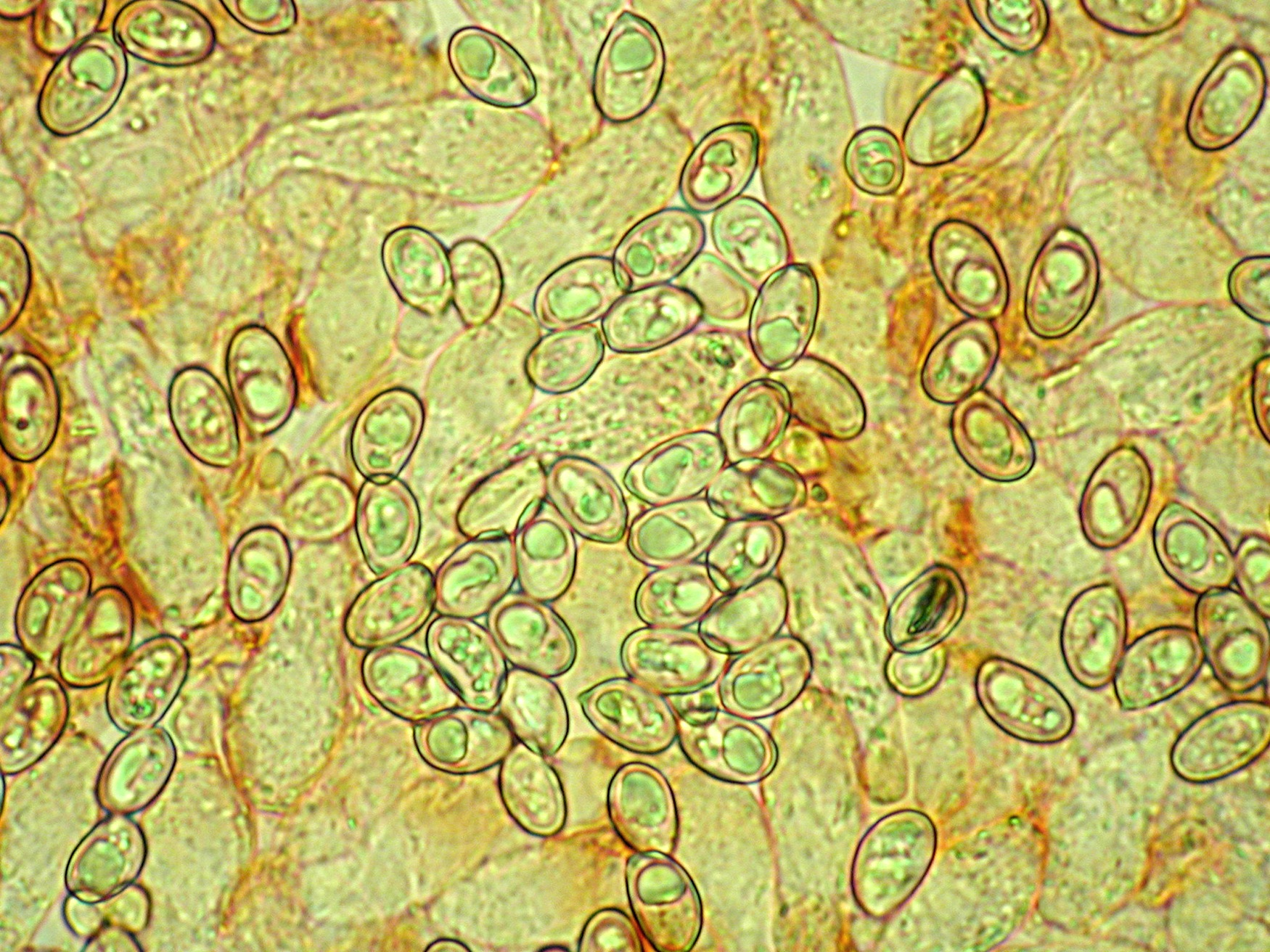
Basidiospores of Volvopluteus gloiocephalus

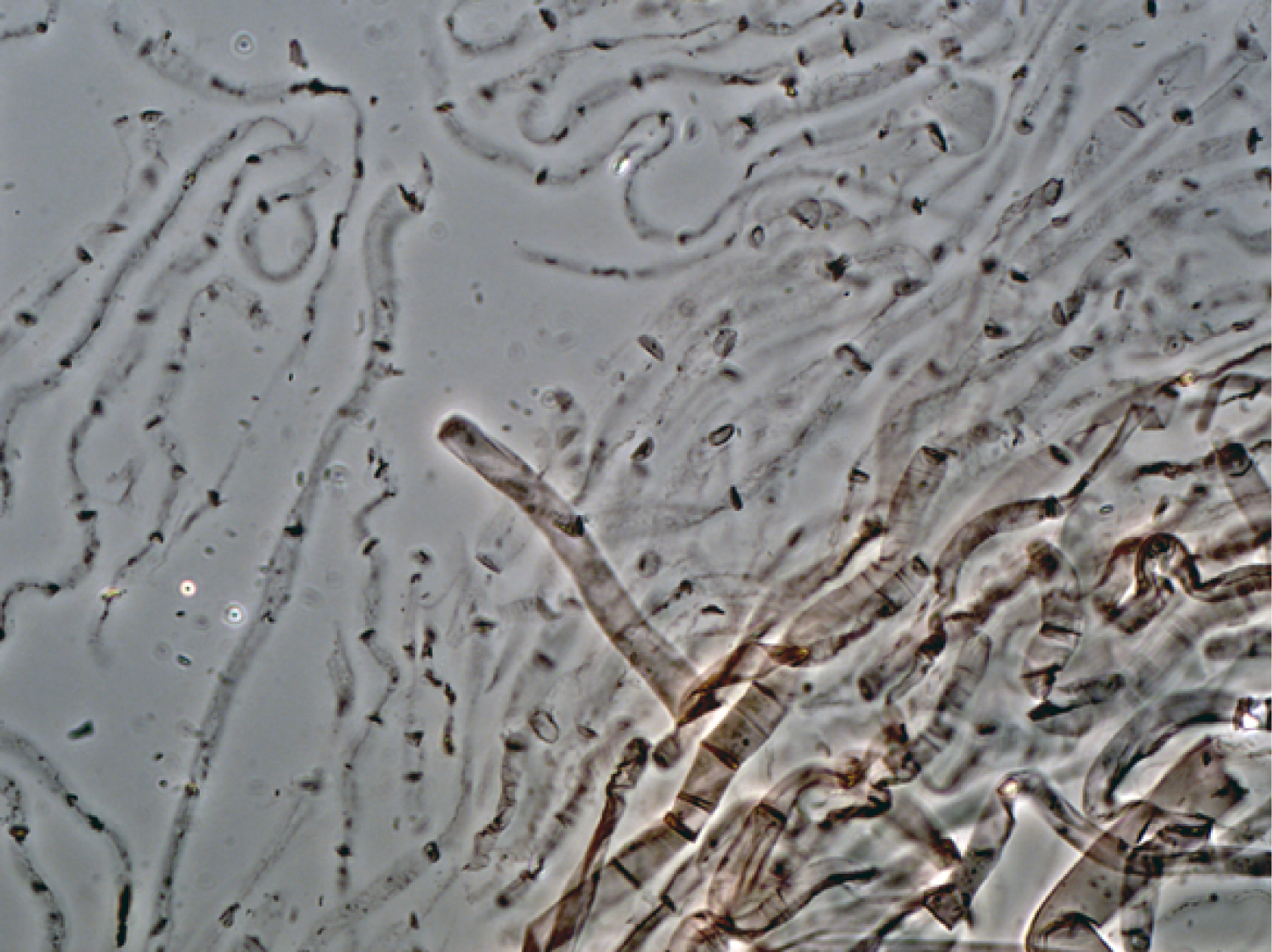
Pileipellis (ixocutis) of Volvopluteus gloiocephalus

The spores of Volvopluteus are relatively large (above 11 μm in length), ellipsoid to oblong, relatively thick-walled and not amyloid or dextrinoid. Basidia are usually 4-spored but 2- and 1-spored versions can sometimes occur. Pleurocystidia and cheilocystidia might be present or absent, and this character as well as the size and shape of these structures, can be used for morphologically separating the different species of the genus. The pileipellis is an ixocutis composed of parallel hyphae embedded in a gelatinous matrix. The stipitipellis is a cutis and can be set with cylindrical caulocystidia. Clamp connections are absent from hyphae in all parts of the fruit body.

=== Ecology ===
All species of Volvopluteus are saprotrophs, and grow terrestrially in gardens, grassy fields (in or outside forests) and on accumulations of vegetable matter (compost, wood chips).

== Classification ==
The type species, Volvopluteus gloiocephalus, has been traditionally included in the genus Volvariella. The first comprehensive molecular phylogeny of the Agaricales by Moncalvo et al. sampled two species of Volvariella (V. volvacea and V. hypophytis) that were placed in a distant position from Pluteus. The study of Matheny et al. in 2006 included Volvariella gloiocephala that was placed as the sister group of Pluteus. The 2011 study of Justo et al. included a broader sampling of Volvariella species and confirmed that the genus, as traditionally defined, was polyphyletic: (i) the bulk of the genus, including the paddy-straw mushroom Volvariella volvacea, is not closely related to Pluteus and (ii) the group of species around Volvariella gloiocephala forms a separate lineage that constitutes the sister group of Pluteus. The name Volvopluteus was then proposed to accommodate the latter group.

Volvopluteus differs from Volvariella morphologically by the average spore length over 11 μm and the pileipellis composed of relatively thin hyphae embedded in a conspicuous gelatinous matrix. The same characters and the presence of a volva separate Volvopluteus from Pluteus. All three genera are characterized by the pink to pink-brown spore prints and inverse hymenophoral trama.

== Distribution ==
The genus is cosmopolitan and has been reported from all continents except Antarctica.

== Edibility ==
Volvopluteus gloiocephalus is edible although is cited as mediocre or of poor quality. Young specimens of V. gloiocephalus have white gills so it is possible to mistake them for an Amanita and vice versa.

The edibility of other species of the genus is not known.

== Species ==
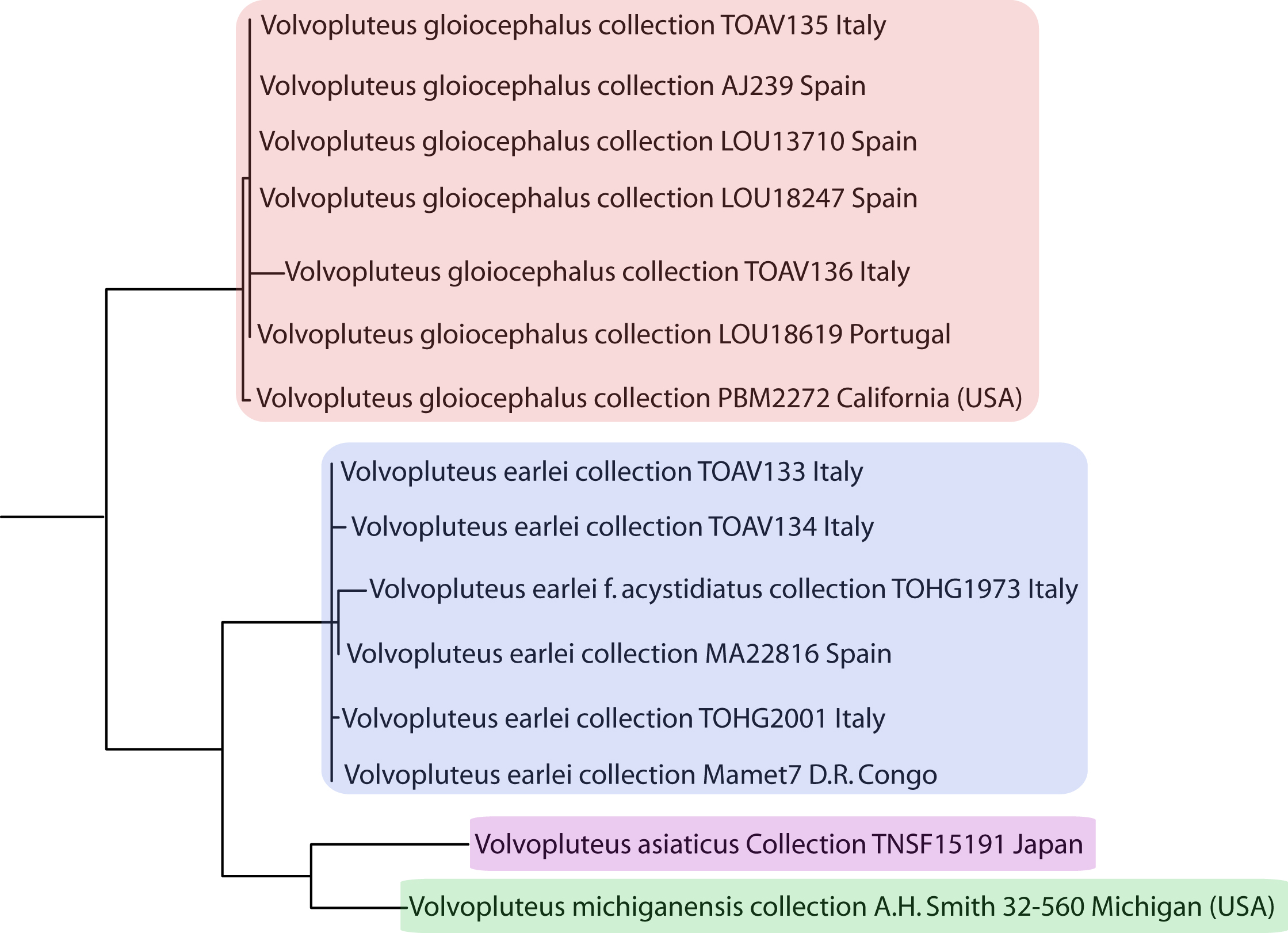
Phylogenetic relationships among the species Volvopluteus as inferred from ITS data. Based on the results presented by Justo et al.

Four species are currently accepted in the genus:

- Volvopluteus asiaticus Justo & Minnis
- Volvopluteus earlei (Murrill) Vizzini, Contu & Justo
- Volvopluteus gloiocephalus (DC) Vizzini, Contu & Justo
- Volvopluteus michiganensis (A.H. Sm.) Justo & Minnis

Other species that probably belong in Volvopluteus based on their morphological characteristics:

- Volvaria microchlamida (Speg.) Sacc. Originally described from Argentina.
- Volvariella alabamensis (Murrill) Shaffer. Originally described from Alabama (USA).
- Volvariella arenaria (Pat.) Singer. Originally described from the Arabian Desert.
- Volvariella californica (Earle) Singer. Originally described from California (USA).
- Volvariella canalipes (Murrill) Shaffer. Originally described from Florida (USA).
- Volvariella cnemidophora (Mont.) Singer. Originally described from Brazil.
- Volvariella insignis Heinem. Originally described from the Democratic Republic of Congo
- Volvariella macrospora Singer. Originally described from Brazil.
- Volvariella stercoraria (Peck) Singer. Originally described from Kansas (USA).

All these species are only known from their respective original descriptions, making it very difficult to establish if they represent independent taxa. For this reason they have not been formally reclassified in the genus Volvopluteus.
