= Volvariella leucocalix =

Scientific classification
- Domain: Eukaryota
- Kingdom: Fungi
- Division: Basidiomycota
- Class: Agaricomycetes
- Order: Agaricales
- Family: Pluteaceae
- Genus: Volvariella
- Species: V. leucocalix

Binomial name
- Volvariella leucocalix Sá and Wartchow (2016)

Species of fungus

Volvariella leucocalix Mycological characteristics
- Gills on hymenium
- Cap is umbonate
- Hymenium is free
- Stipe has a volva
- Spore print is salmon
- Ecology is saprotrophic
- Edibility is unknown

Volvariella leucocalix is a species of fungus in the family Pluteaceae. Its name is attributed to the white volva pertaining to the species. More specifically, the name comes from the Greek words, ‘leuco’, meaning a whitish color, and ‘calix’, meaning cup. First described by Sa MCA and Felipe Wartchow in 2016 as a species of Volvariella.

== Description ==
The sporocarp is small and has a fuliginous brown umbonate cap with a diameter of 26 mm. The stem is white and becomes narrower the further up it is and is hollow at its apex. Based on a sample of 30 basidiospores, it was found that their length ranged from 5–5.6 × 2.6–3.6 μm, with an average length 5.2 μm for a single basidiome, the spores are also ellipsoid to elongate and pinkish/salmon in color.
