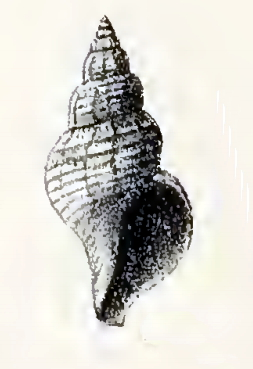
- Original image of a shell of Pleurotomella lucasii

Scientific classification
- Kingdom: Animalia
- Phylum: Mollusca
- Class: Gastropoda
- Subclass: Caenogastropoda
- Order: Neogastropoda
- Superfamily: Conoidea
- Family: Raphitomidae
- Genus: Pleurotomella
- Species: P. lucasii

Binomial name
- Pleurotomella lucasii (Melvill, 1904)

Synonyms
- Daphnella lucasii Melvill, 1904

= Pleurotomella lucasii =

Species of gastropod

Pleurotomella lucasii is a species of sea snail, a marine gastropod mollusk in the family Raphitomidae.

== Description ==
The length of the shell attains 10 mm, its diameter 4.5 mm.

This fusiform species is more effuse and inflated than its congeners. The shell contains 9 whorls including 4 apical whorls. The apical whorls are beautifully decussate. The whorls of the teleoconch are ventricose. The conspicuous spiral, raised lirae (7 at the penultimate whorl, 18 on the body whorl) extend at unequal intervals over the whole surface of the lower whorls. They are almost unbroken on the ventricose body whorl, while crossed frequently above by irregular liral riblets on the upper whorls. The aperture is rotund-ovate. The outer lip is very effuse. The recurved siphonal canal is slightly produced. The shell is hardly shining and shows dark brown spots.

== Distribution ==
{This marine species occurs in the Gulf of Oman
