= Volvopluteus asiaticus =

Scientific classification
- Kingdom: Fungi
- Division: Basidiomycota
- Class: Agaricomycetes
- Order: Agaricales
- Family: Pluteaceae
- Genus: Volvopluteus
- Species: V. asiaticus

Binomial name
- Volvopluteus asiaticus Justo & Minnis (2011)
- Hokkaido in Japan, where the species was originally found

Species of fungus

Volvopluteus asiaticus Mycological characteristics
- Gills on hymenium
- Cap is ovate or flat
- Hymenium is free
- Stipe has a volva
- Spore print is pink to pinkish-brown
- Ecology is saprotrophic
- Edibility is unknown

Volvopluteus asiaticus is a species of mushroom in the Pluteaceae family. The cap of this mushroom is about 70–90 mm (2.8–3.5 in) in diameter, greyish brown to brown. The gills start out white but they soon turn pink. The stipe is white and has a volva at the base. Microscopical features and DNA sequence data are of great importance for separating this taxon from related species. V. asiaticus is a saprotrophic fungus that was originally described as growing on the ground, in the humus layer. It is only known from Hokkaido (Japan).

== Taxonomy ==
The type collection of this species was originally reported under the name Volvariella gloiocephala by Takehashi and colleagues in 2010. Morphological revision and DNA sequence data obtained from these specimens showed that this taxon belongs in the genus Volvopluteus and that is a separate species from all the other members of that genus.

The epithet asiaticus makes reference to the fact that this species was originally described, and thus far only known, from Asia. The type collection of this species is preserved at the National Museum of Nature and Science.

== Description ==
=== Macroscopic characters ===
The cap of Volvopluteus asiaticus is between 70 and 90 mm (2.8 and 3.5 in) in diameter, more or less ovate or conical when young, then expands to convex or flat, it can have an umbo at center in mature specimens; the surface is markedly viscid in fresh basidiocarps and rugose, with powdery, minute, whitish scales. The color varies from greyish brown to brown, with a dark brown center. The gills are crowded, free from the stipe, ventricose, up to 9 mm (0.35 in) broad; white when young and turning pink with age. The stipe is 85–99 mm (3.3–3.9 in) long and 9–21 mm (0.35–0.83 in) wide, clavate with a bulbous base; the surface is white, smooth or striate. The volva is sacciform, white and with a smooth surface, up to 40 mm (1.6 in) high. The context is white on stipe and pileus, and it does not change when bruised or exposed to air, but it is dark grey-brown right under the pileipellis. Data on smell, taste and spore print were not recorded.

=== Microscopic characters ===
The basidiospores are 12–14.5 by 7–8.5 μm and ellipsoid. Basidia are 29–45 by 10–15 μm and four-spored. Pleurocystidia are 45–85 by 12–30 μm, fusiform or utriform, and commonly have an apical excrescence up to 10–15 μm long. Cheilocystidia are 45–70 by 14–25 μm, mostly lageniform, a few clavate, utriform or ovate; they completely cover the gill edge. The pileipellis is an ixocutis (parallel hyphae wide embedded in a gelatinous matrix), while the Stipitipellis is a cutis (parallel hyphae not embedded in a gelatinous matrix). Caulocystidia are sometimes present, and they measure 100–250 by 10–15 μm, mostly cylindrical.

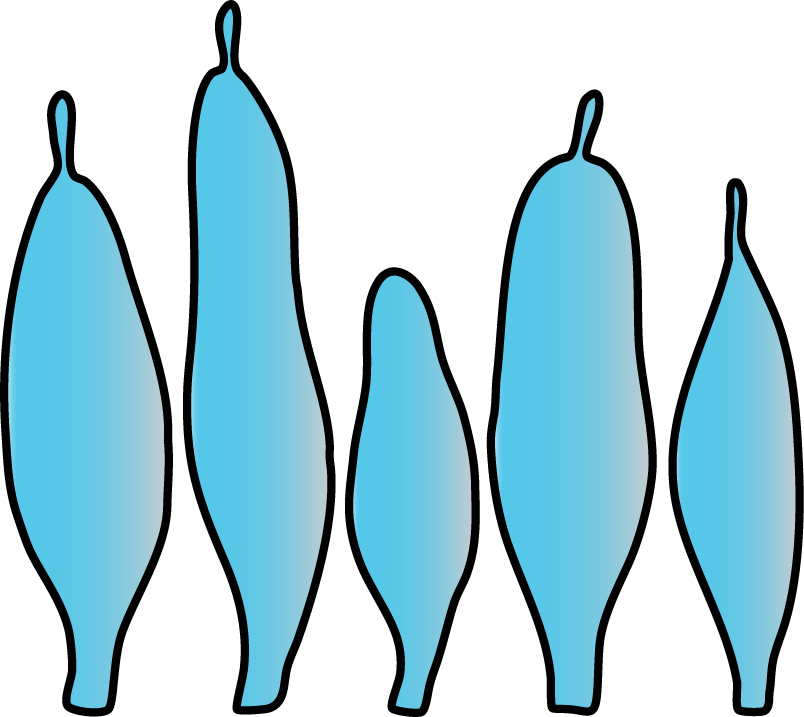
Pleurocystidia of Volvopluteus asiaticus

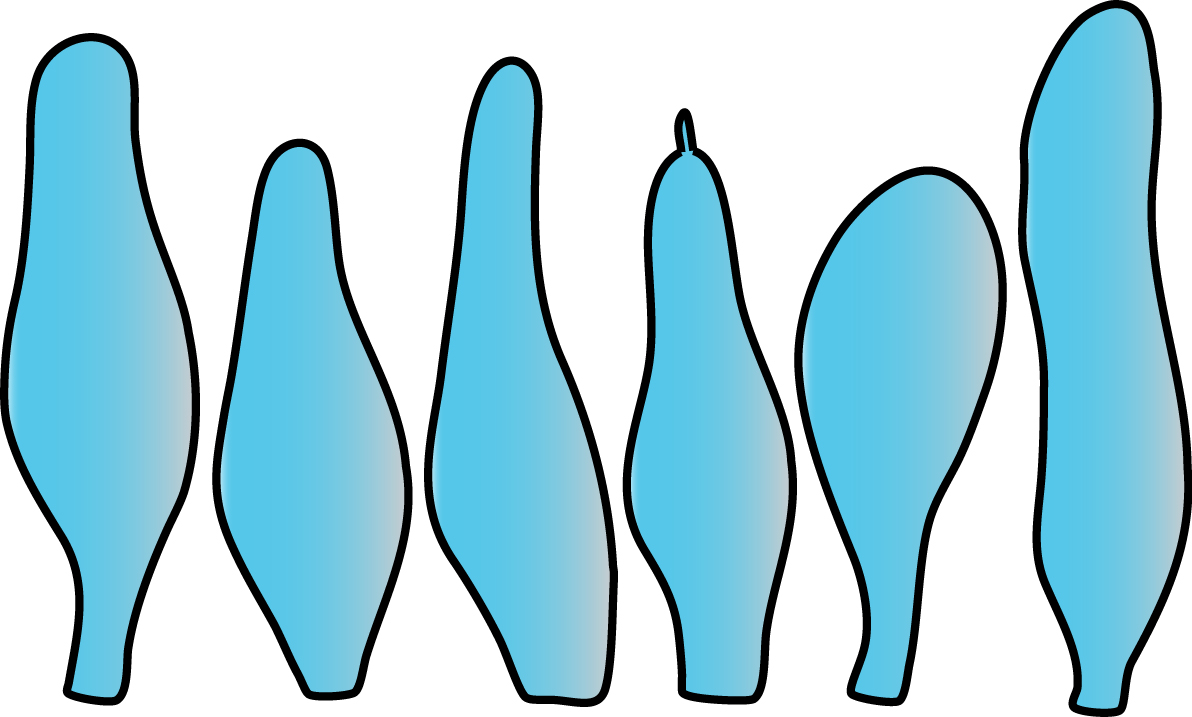
Cheilocystidia of Volvopluteus asiaticus

=== Ecology ===
Volvopluteus asiaticus is a saprotrophic mushroom. The type collection was collected on the ground, in a forest area.

== Distribution ==
This species is only known from the type locality: Tonebetsu Nature Park in Hokkaido, Japan.

== Similar species ==
Molecular analyses of the internal transcribed spacer region clearly separate the four species currently recognized in Volvopluteus but morphological identification can be more difficult due to the sometimes overlapping morphological variation among the species. Size of the basidiocarps, color of the pileus, spore size, presence or absence of cystidia and morphology of the cystidia are the most important characters for morphological species delimitation in the genus. Volvopluteus asiaticus stands apart from other species by the pleurocystidia provided with apical excrescences and the cheilocystidia that are predominantly lageniform.

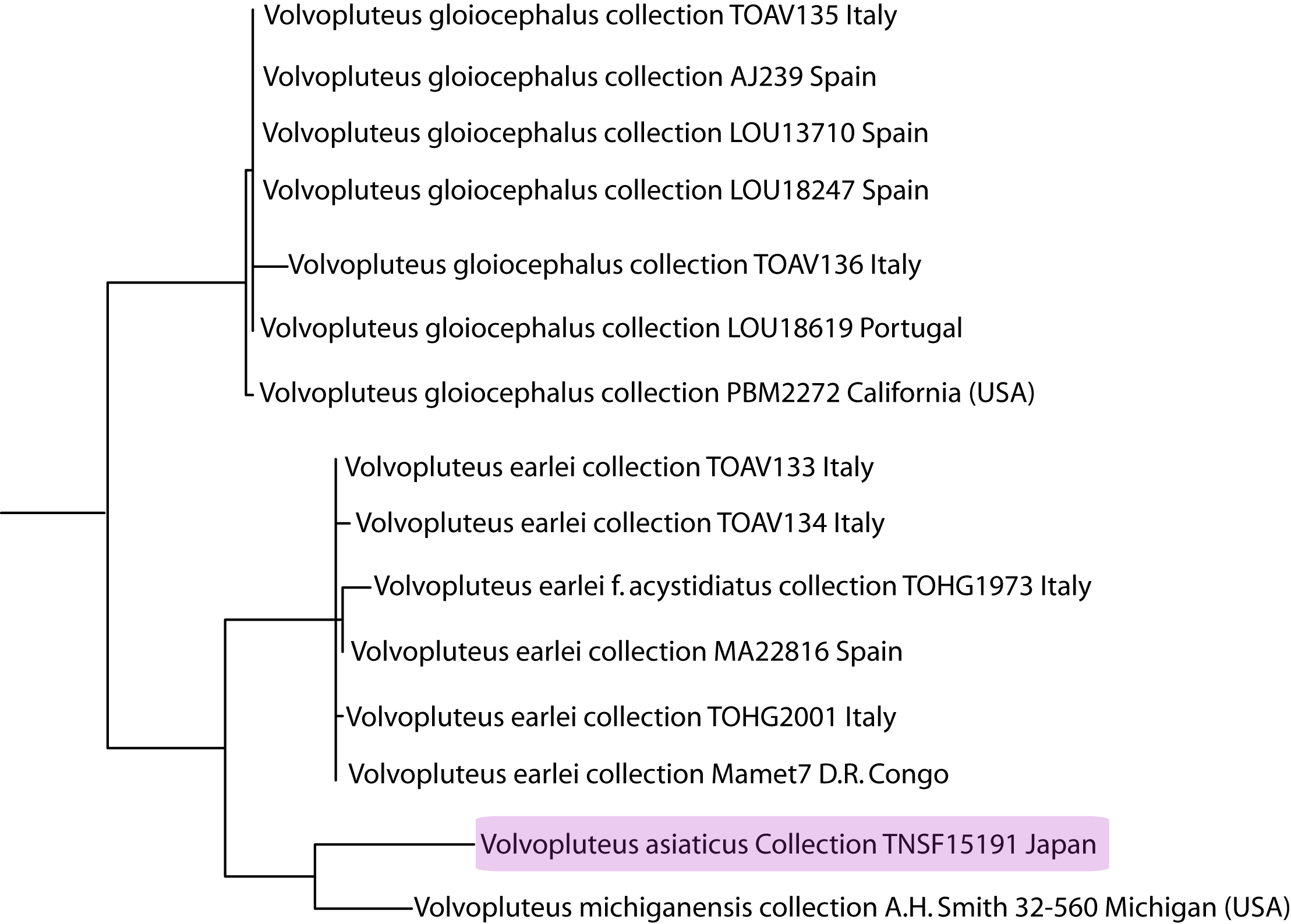
Phylogenetic relationships between Volvopluteus asiaticus and the other species of the genus as inferred from ITS data, based on the results presented by Justo et al.
