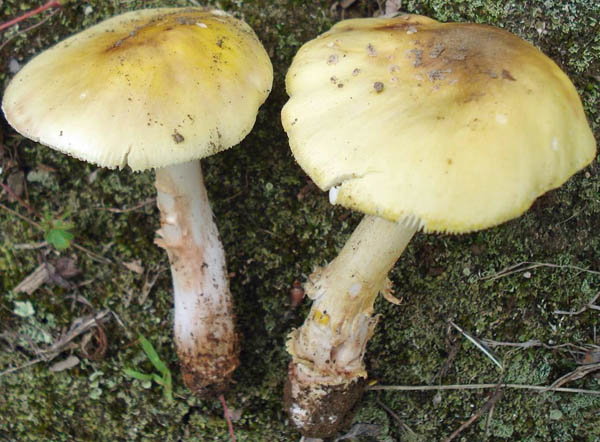

Scientific classification
- Kingdom: Fungi
- Division: Basidiomycota
- Class: Agaricomycetes
- Order: Agaricales
- Family: Amanitaceae
- Genus: Amanita
- Species: A. flavorubens

Binomial name
- Amanita flavorubens E.-J. Gilbert (1941)

Synonyms
- Agaricus flavorubens (Berk. & Mont.) Berk. & Mont. (1856); Amplariella flavorubens (Berk. & Mont.) E.-J. Gilbert (1940)

= Amanita flavorubens =

Species of fungus

Amanita flavorubens
- Mycological characteristics
- Gills on hymenium
- Cap is umbonate
- Hymenium is free
- Stipe has a volva
- Spore print is white
- Ecology is mycorrhizal
- Edibility is unknown

Amanita flavorubens, also known as the yellow American blusher or the yellow American blushing amanita, is a species of fungus in the family Amanitaceae.

== Description ==
The cap of is 3.5–10.5 centimetres (1 1/2–4 inches) wide, yellow to brassy yellow to lemon yellow, sometimes dark orange brown, sometimes with pigment entirely washed out by rain becoming pallid, sometimes very deep wine red in its entirety due to bruising during development, subovoid to hemispheric to plano-convex to convex, depressed in the center, slightly tacky to dull to subviscid to subvelvety, with an incurved or downcurved, rimose, and nonstriate margin (may become slightly striate with age). It is adorned with conspicuous, woolly to felty, yellow warts; bald underneath the warts; the margin not lined, or only faintly lined at maturity.

The volva is present as yellow to orange to bright orange-yellow flocculent to confluent warts, friable, sparsely and irregularly distributed, easily removable, pulverulent, splotchy brown around the center, yellow at the edge. The flesh is 3–7 millimetres (1/8–1/4 in) thick over the stem, thinning evenly to the margin, white or yellowish, bright yellow just under the cap skin. The gills are free to very narrowly adnate, subcrowded to crowded, creamy ivory to cream to off-white, 3–8 mm broad, with a white pulverulent edge and also a small decurrent tooth. The short gills are truncate to subtruncate to subattenuate to attenuate to attenuate in steps, unevenly distributed, of diverse lengths, and plentiful. The stem is 5.2–15 cm × 0.7–1.4 cm, usually narrowing upward, infrequently narrowing downward, flaring at the top, yellow to white or very pale yellowish white and pruinose to finely powdery above the ring, white to yellow or occasionally with scattered yellowish surface fibrils and fibrillose below the ring, sometimes silky longitudinally striate.

The bulb is 15–25 × 15–21 mm, more or less turnip-shaped, with light red-pinkish stains; interior of the bulb is often the place where wine-red staining first appears intensely. The ring is membranous, superior, skirt-like, flaring then collapsing, pale yellowish white to cream to white, slightly more yellow underneath, with a thickened edge. The volva is absent or present as rings of yellow-brown warts on the bulb or brilliant yellow loose patches appressed to the stem and are large, friable, detersile, sometimes lost during collecting. The flesh is white or slightly pink, hollow or partially hollowed in the middle to stuffed.

The spores measure 7.8–11 × 5.4–7 μm and are ellipsoid to elongate (infrequently broadly ellipsoid) and amyloid. Clamps are not present at bases of basidia.

Rain will quickly wash pigment away from the yellow-orange pileus. Bruising is sometimes reported only from the stem base for this species, but it commonly bruises throughout the fruiting body. Occasionally, especially in areas with dense root mats, specimens will be found in which the entire pileus is wine-colored from bruising during expansion through the root mat. A researcher has found one specimen with the cap intensely bruised before expansion. The cap had a dark red brown color in the center and elsewhere ranged from brown to pale yellow brown at the cap margin. The cap warts were in concentric rings and somewhat concolorous with the surrounding cap skin, but always with a distinct yellow tint. The odor is of clean laundry.

== Distribution and habitat ==
A. flavorubens was originally described from the U.S. state of Ohio, and is also known from forests associated with beech (Fagus grandifolia), oak (Quercus), pine (Pinus), birch (Betula), and Canadian hemlock (Tsuga canadensis) from south-eastern Canada to the state of Alabama in eastern North America, central Mexico, and south-eastern Arizona.

A. flavorubens is one of the few taxa in North America that are known to have a western population disjunct from an eastern primary area of distribution.
