= Conocybe corneri =

Scientific classification
- Domain: Eukaryota
- Kingdom: Fungi
- Division: Basidiomycota
- Class: Agaricomycetes
- Order: Agaricales
- Family: Bolbitiaceae
- Genus: Conocybe
- Species: C. corneri

Binomial name
- Conocybe corneri Watling (1979)

Species of fungus

Conocybe corneri Mycological characteristics
- Gills on hymenium
- Cap is conical or flat
- Hymenium is free or adnexed
- Stipe has a volva
- Spore print is brown
- Ecology is saprotrophic
- Edibility is unknown

Conocybe corneri is a species of mushroom-producing fungus in the family Bolbitiaceae.

== Taxonomy ==
It was described in 1979 by the Scottish mycologist Roy Watling who classified it as Conocybe corneri.

It is notable as being one of the few Conocybe species which has a volva and subsequently was placed in Conocybe sect. Singerella along with the other volvate species.

== Description ==
Conocybe corneri is a small volvate mushroom.

Cap: 2-6cm wide and 1.5-2.5cm high starting conical then umbonate before flattening with age. The surface is dark purple with fine striations when young but it becomes wine red or reddish grey as it ages. It is hygrophanous and smooth with finely pubescent white hairs. The flesh is 1-1.5mm thick in the centre of the cap and is concolorous with the exterior surface. Stem: 10-16cm long and 2-3mm thick tapering upwards from a 5-7mm base. The surface is covered in fine pubescent hairs with spiraling striations up its length and is white towards the apex and base. The white floccose-membranous volva measures 8-12 x 7-9mm and splits irregularly or splits in half. Gills: Free or slightly adnexed, crowded and initially white turning pale ochre-cinnamon from the margins towards the stem. Spore print: Brown. Spores: 8.5-11 x 6-6.5 μm. Broadly ellipsoid to angular in face view and slightly flattened on one side in side view. Smooth with a very distinct apiculus and germ pore. Basidia: 26-30 x 11-12 μm. 4 spored, clavate and hyaline in water or alkaline mounts.

== Etymology ==
The specific epithet corneri is named for the English mycologist E. J. H. Corner who collected the holotype specimen in 1940.

== Habitat and distribution ==
The specimens studied by Watling were found on elephant dung in Malaya and on the forest floor in New Guinea. It was also cultivated for study in the Singapore Botanic Gardens by incubating elephant dung from the forest in under bell jars demonstrating that the growth of the mushroom is first visible in the early morning with the cap opening after dark whilst the volva remains immersed in the dung where it is inconspicuous.
