= Conocybe anthuriae =

Scientific classification
- Domain: Eukaryota
- Kingdom: Fungi
- Division: Basidiomycota
- Class: Agaricomycetes
- Order: Agaricales
- Family: Bolbitiaceae
- Genus: Conocybe
- Species: C. anthuriae

Binomial name
- Conocybe anthuriae Watling & Hauskn. (1997)

Species of fungus

Conocybe anthuriae Mycological characteristics
- Gills on hymenium
- Cap is campanulate or convex
- Hymenium is adnate
- Stipe has a volva
- Spore print is brown
- Ecology is saprotrophic
- Edibility is unknown

Conocybe anthuriae is a species of mushroom-producing fungus in the family Bolbitiaceae.

== Taxonomy ==
It was described in 1997 by the Scottish mycologist Roy Watling and the Austrian mycologist Anton Hausknecht who classified it as Conocybe anthuriae.

It is notable as being one of the few Conocybe species which has a volva and subsequently was placed in Conocybe sect. Singerella along with the other volvate species.

== Description ==
Conocybe anthuriae is a small brown volvate mushroom.

Cap: 0.6-1.5cm wide and up to 1cm high starting campanulate to convex and not expanding much with age. The surface is hygrophanous and brown but becomes paler or dirty yellow-orange in the centre with a yellowish white colour at the cap margins. It is smooth and lacking in striations when young but is radially sulcate when older with a pubescent coating when dry. Gills: Adnate, distant and pale cream coloured becoming pale yellowish brown with age. Slightly ventricose. Stem: 1.5-3cm long and 1-1.5mm thick tapering up from a bulbous base of up to 3mm wide. The surface is white to cream, not darkening with age and has a pruinose to pubescent coating with a striate texture. The volva is distinct, white and membranous with an uneven margin that is slightly denticulate. Spores: 10.5-13 x 7-8.3 μm. Ellipsoid with a prominent germ pore that measures 1-1.5 μm and a thick wall of up to 1.5 μm. The spores are yellow in water turning dark reddish brown in KOH with a wine red wall. Basidia: 18-25 x 10-14 μm. 4 spored with clamp connections.

== Etymology ==
The specific epithet anthuriae is in reference to the cultivated Anthurium plants that the species was found growing with.

== Habitat and distribution ==
The specimens studied by Watling and Hausknecht were found in Mauritius where they were growing in an open glass house on an Anthurium plantation in soil mixed with composted sugar cane.
