= Conocybe volvata =

Scientific classification
- Domain: Eukaryota
- Kingdom: Fungi
- Division: Basidiomycota
- Class: Agaricomycetes
- Order: Agaricales
- Family: Bolbitiaceae
- Genus: Conocybe
- Species: C. volvata

Binomial name
- Conocybe volvata K.A. Thomas, Hauskn. & Manim. (2001)

Species of fungus

Conocybe volvata Mycological characteristics
- Gills on hymenium
- Cap is campanulate or convex
- Hymenium is adnexed
- Stipe has a volva
- Spore print is brown
- Ecology is saprotrophic
- Edibility is unknown

Conocybe volvata is a species of mushroom-producing fungus in the family Bolbitiaceae.

== Taxonomy ==
It was described in 2001 by the K. Agregtitous Thomas, Anton Hausknecht and P. Manimohan who classified it as Conocybe volvata.

It is notable as being one of the few Conocybe species which has a volva and subsequently was placed in Conocybe sect. Singerella along with the other volvate species.

== Description ==
Conocybe volvata is a small brown volvate mushroom.

Cap: 1.5-5.5 cm wide and campanulate, conical or conico-convex sometimes with an obtuse umbo. The surface is brown and may be concolorous all over or present with reddish brown colouration towards the centre disc and light brown colours towards the margin. It is hygrophanous and becomes greyish orange as the moisture content changes. The surface is smooth with fine striations visible when moist and the flesh is brownish white and up to 1.5mm thick at the centre. Gills: Adnexed to adnate, light brown to brown and close to crowded. Up to 3.5mm wide with lamellulae (partial gills) of different lengths. Stem: 5–14 cm long and 1.5-6mm thick becoming narrower at the apex. The surface has fine striations along its length and is white towards the apex with a pruinose coating visible with a lens and reddish brown towards the base. The volva is split in half when open and has a cottony texture. Spores: 9.5-14.5 x 7-9 x 6-8 μm. Ellipsoid to oviform-ellipsoid and frequently subhexagonal in face view. Smooth, thick walled and with an apically truncated broad germ pore. Pale brown to brown in KOH. Basidia: 19–26.5 x 11.5-15.5 μm. Clavate, 4 spored.

== Habitat and distribution ==
The specimens studied by Thomas, Hausknecht and Manimohan were found in Kerala State, India where they were growing on elephant dung.
