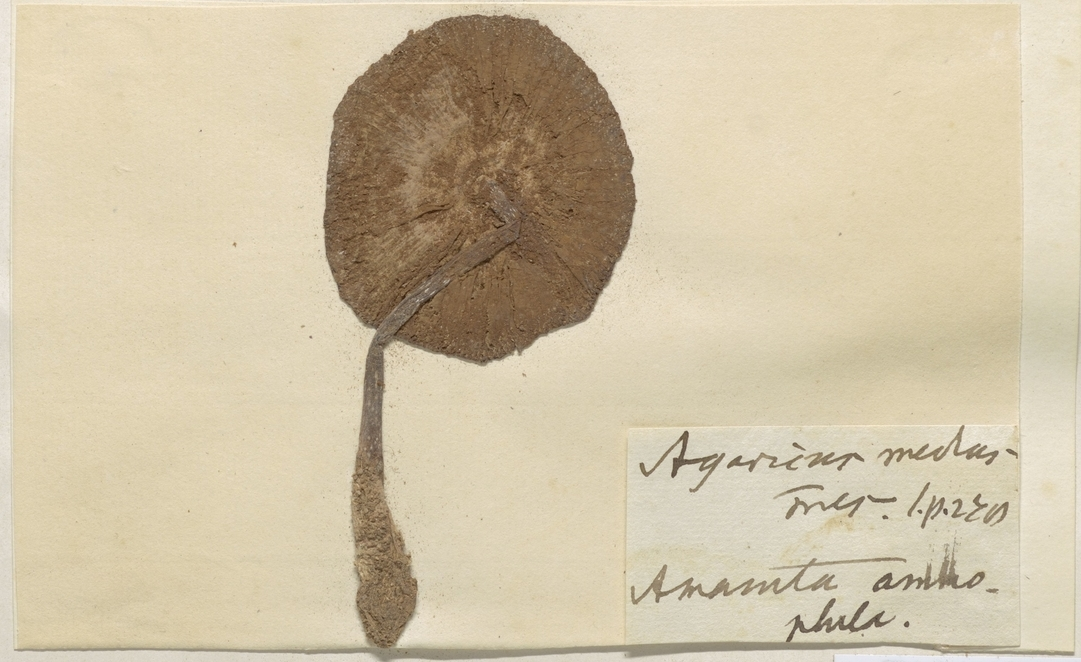
- Dried specimen of Volvariella media

Scientific classification
- Domain: Eukaryota
- Kingdom: Fungi
- Division: Basidiomycota
- Class: Agaricomycetes
- Order: Agaricales
- Family: Pluteaceae
- Genus: Volvariella
- Species: V. media

Binomial name
- Volvariella media (Pers.) Singer

= Volvariella media =

Species of fungus

Volvariella media, is a species of agaric fungus in the family Pluteaceae, described by Rolf Singer in 1951.

== Distribution and habitat ==
It was noted in Asia and Europe, with the most sightings in Europe. It grows in grass.
