= Conocybe vaginata =

Scientific classification
- Domain: Eukaryota
- Kingdom: Fungi
- Division: Basidiomycota
- Class: Agaricomycetes
- Order: Agaricales
- Family: Bolbitiaceae
- Genus: Conocybe
- Species: C. vaginata

Binomial name
- Conocybe vaginata Watling (1979)

Species of fungus

Conocybe vaginata Mycological characteristics
- Gills on hymenium
- Cap is conical or ovate
- Hymenium is free or adnexed
- Stipe has a volva
- Spore print is brown
- Ecology is saprotrophic
- Edibility is unknown

Conocybe vaginata is a species of mushroom-producing fungus in the family Bolbitiaceae.

== Taxonomy ==
It was described in 1979 by the Scottish mycologist Roy Watling who classified it as Conocybe vaginata.

It is notable as being one of the few Conocybe species which has a volva and subsequently was placed in Conocybe sect. Singerella along with the other volvate species.

== Description ==
Conocybe vaginata is a small volvate mushroom.

Cap: 1.4-2cm wide starting hemispherical to ovoid to campanulate before expanding with age. The hygrophanous surface is smooth, dry and very striated with a brownish or greyish beige colour. Stem: 7-7.6cm long and 1-2mm thick. The surface is white and smooth with a pubescent coating all over but no striations. It is very fragile and hollow with a swollen base that sits inside the persistent, membranous white volva. Gills: Free to adnexed, greyish beige to pale rust coloured becoming more rust brown with age. They are narrow and ventricose. Spores: (11) 11.5-12.5 (13) x 8.5-10 x 6.5-8 μm. Broadly ellipsoid and smooth with a thick wall and large germ pore. Yellow-brown in water turning red-brown in KOH. Basidia: (17.5) 20-24 x 12-15 μm. Clavate and hyaline in water or alkaline mounts.

== Habitat and distribution ==
The specimens studied by Watling were found under bamboo in Castanopsis and Araucaria woodland and on rotten wood in Castanopsis forests in New Guinea.
