= Conocybe volviornata =

Scientific classification
- Domain: Eukaryota
- Kingdom: Fungi
- Division: Basidiomycota
- Class: Agaricomycetes
- Order: Agaricales
- Family: Bolbitiaceae
- Genus: Conocybe
- Species: C. volviornata

Binomial name
- Conocybe volviornata E. Horak, Hauskn. & Desjardin (2002)

Species of fungus

Conocybe volviornata Mycological characteristics
- Gills on hymenium
- Cap is conical
- Hymenium is adnexed
- Stipe has a volva
- Spore print is brown
- Ecology is saprotrophic
- Edibility is unknown

Conocybe volviornata is a species of mushroom-producing fungus in the family Bolbitiaceae.

== Taxonomy ==
It was described in 2002 by the Egon Horak, Anton Hausknecht and Dennis E. Desjardin who classified it as Conocybe volviornata.

It is notable as being one of the few Conocybe species which has a volva and subsequently was placed in Conocybe sect. Singerella along with the other volvate species.

== Description ==
Conocybe volviornata is a small volvate mushroom.

Cap: 1–2.5 cm wide and conical. The surface is pinkish-beige with a reddish-brown centre and a white fluffy to velvety coating from the pileicystidia. It is membranous, dry, thin and brittle and very strongly hygrophanous with the striations being visible from the margin to centre when moist. Stem: 4.5–9 cm long and 1.5-2mm thick tapering upwards slightly from a 6mm wide base. The surface is the same colour or paler than the cap with a dense covering of caulocystidia. It is fragile but solid rather than hollow with a membranous, persistent white volva at the base. Gills: Adnexed, crowded, pale rust brown. Spore print: Rusty ochre. Spores: 12.5-15 x 9.5-12 x 7.5-9.5 μm. Sublimoniform to broadly amygdaliform in side view, sublimoniform to subhexagonal to submitriform in front view. Smooth with a thick wall of up to 1.2 μm with a distinctive germ pore. Rusty ochre-brown in colour. Basidia: 15-24 x 10-12 μm. 2 spored, broadly clavate.

== Habitat and distribution ==
The specimens studied by Horak, Hausknecht and Desjardin were found growing on soil in Indonesian rainforests dominated by Fagaceae trees.
