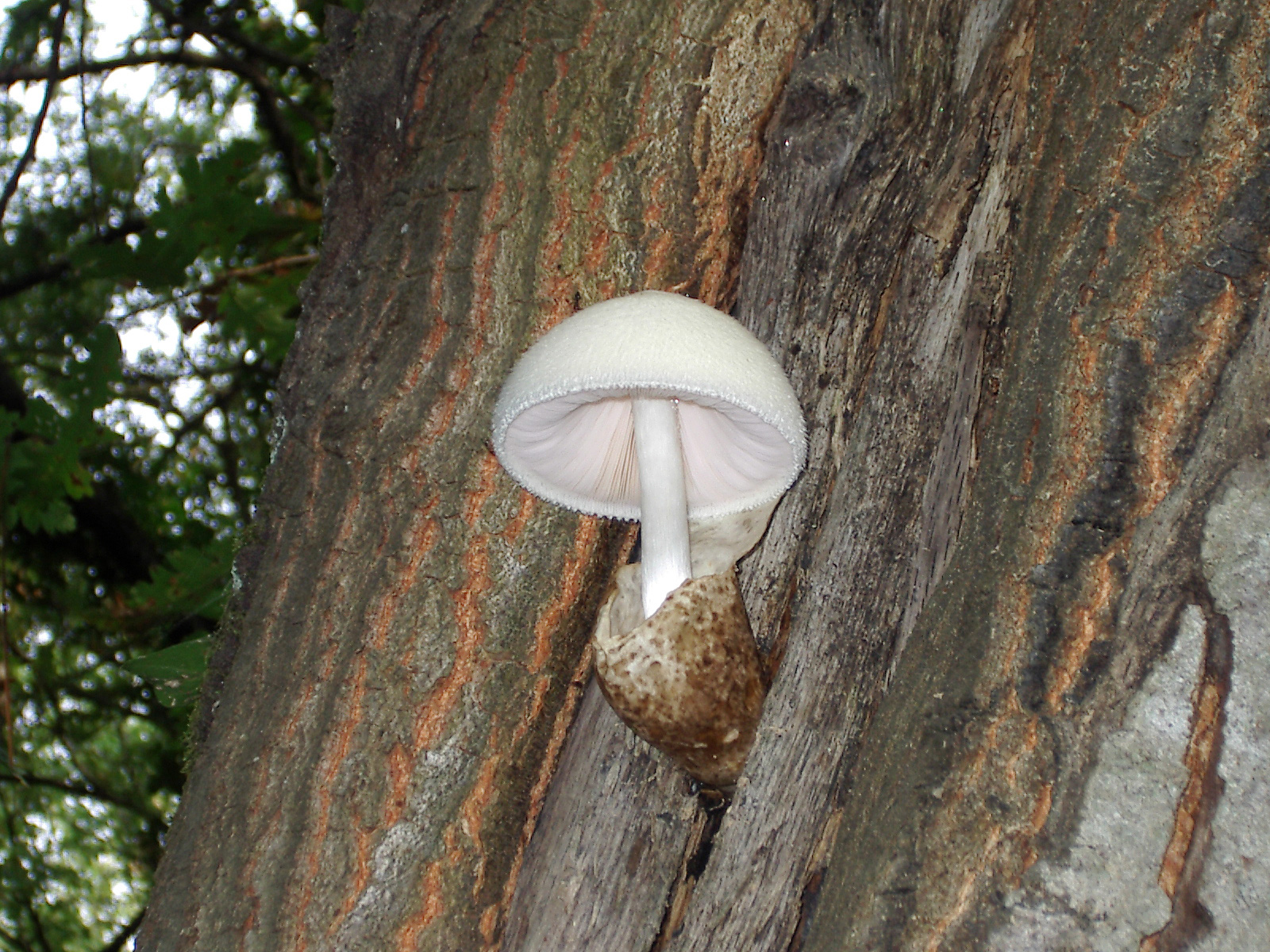
- V. bombycina

Scientific classification
- Domain: Eukaryota
- Kingdom: Fungi
- Division: Basidiomycota
- Class: Agaricomycetes
- Order: Agaricales
- Family: Pluteaceae
- Genus: Volvariella; Speg. (1898)

Type species
- Volvariella argentina Speg. (1898)

= Volvariella =

Genus of fungi

Volvariella is a genus of fungi with deep salmon-pink gills and spore prints.

== Description ==
The mushrooms lack a ring, and have an Amanita-like volva at the stem base. Some species of Amanita look similar, but Amanita has white spores and often have a ring. Since the gills of young Volvariella are white at first, they are more easily mistaken for Amanita. The genus is estimated to contain about 50 species.

== Taxonomy ==
Many sources list Volvariella as a member of the Pluteaceae family, but recent DNA studies have revealed that Pluteus and Volvariella evolved separately and have very different DNA. These studies show that Volvariella is very closely related to "schizophylloid" mushrooms like Schizophyllum commune.

=== Species ===
Image	Scientific name	Distribution
	Volvariella bombycina	Iran, China, India, Korea, and Pakistan
	Volvariella caesiotincta	Europe
	Volvariella gloiocephala	Australia
	Volvariella hypopithys	
	Volvariella indica	India
	Volvariella iranica	Iran
	Volvariella jamaicensis	
	Volvariella lepiotospora	
	Volvariella leucocalix	Brazil
	Volvariella media	Asia and Europe
	Volvariella peckii	
	Volvariella pusilla	Asia and Europe, North America, Africa and Australia
	Volvariella sathei	India
	Volvariella surrecta	North America north of Mexico, Northern Africa, Europe, New Zealand, and Asia
	Volvariella variicystidiosa	Pakistan
	Volvariella volvacea	East and Southeast Asia

== Uses ==
Volvariella volvacea, well known as the "paddy straw mushroom", is cultured in rice straw in the Philippines and Southeast Asia. This species also favors wood chip piles. It is easy to confuse with Amanita species such as A. phalloides (the death cap). This mistake is the leading cause of lethal mushroom poisoning in the United States. Volvariella and Amanita cannot be distinguished in the early "button stage", that, for many, is considered the best stage to collect Volvariella for consumption. Like Amanita, the paddy straw mushroom has a volva, or universal veil, so called because it is a membrane that encapsulates the entire mushroom when it is young; this structure breaks apart as the mushroom expands, leaving parts that can be found at the base of the stalk as a cup-like structure.

Some species of Volvariella are popular edibles in Europe, accounting for 16% of total production of cultivated mushrooms in the world.
