= Ventricose =

Swollen, distended, or inflated especially on one side

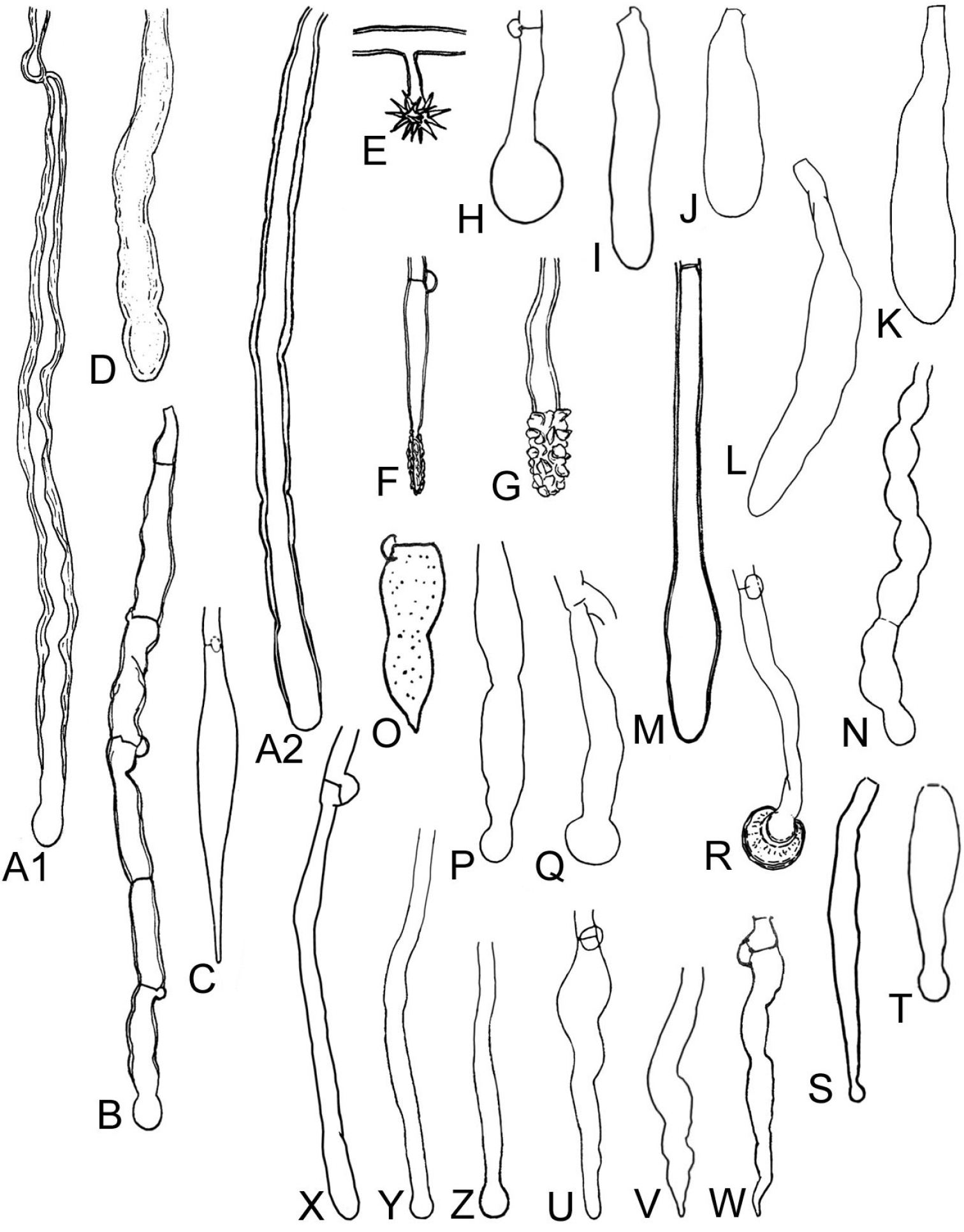
Types and shapes of cystidial elements in Hyphodontia s.l.: O is ventricose submucronate

Ventricose is an adjective describing the condition of a mushroom, gastropod or plant that it is "swollen, distended, or inflated especially on one side".

== Mycology ==
In mycology, ventricose is a condition in which the cystidia, lamella or stipe of a mushroom is swollen in the middle.

== Gastropods ==
In gastropods, if the shell of a snail is ventricose or subventricose, it means the whorl of the shell is swollen.
