= Pellis =

The term pellis refers to the cellular cortical layers of a mushroom. The term was introduced by Dutch mycologist Cornelis Bas in 1969, who distinguished different layers of the pellis as suprapellis, mediopellis and subpellis. He also distinguished various topographies of the pellis. For example, pileipellis refers to the cuticle of the mushroom pileus (or cap), while stipitipellis is the cuticle of the stipe (the stem).
