= Volva (mycology) =

Cup-like structure at the base of a mushroom

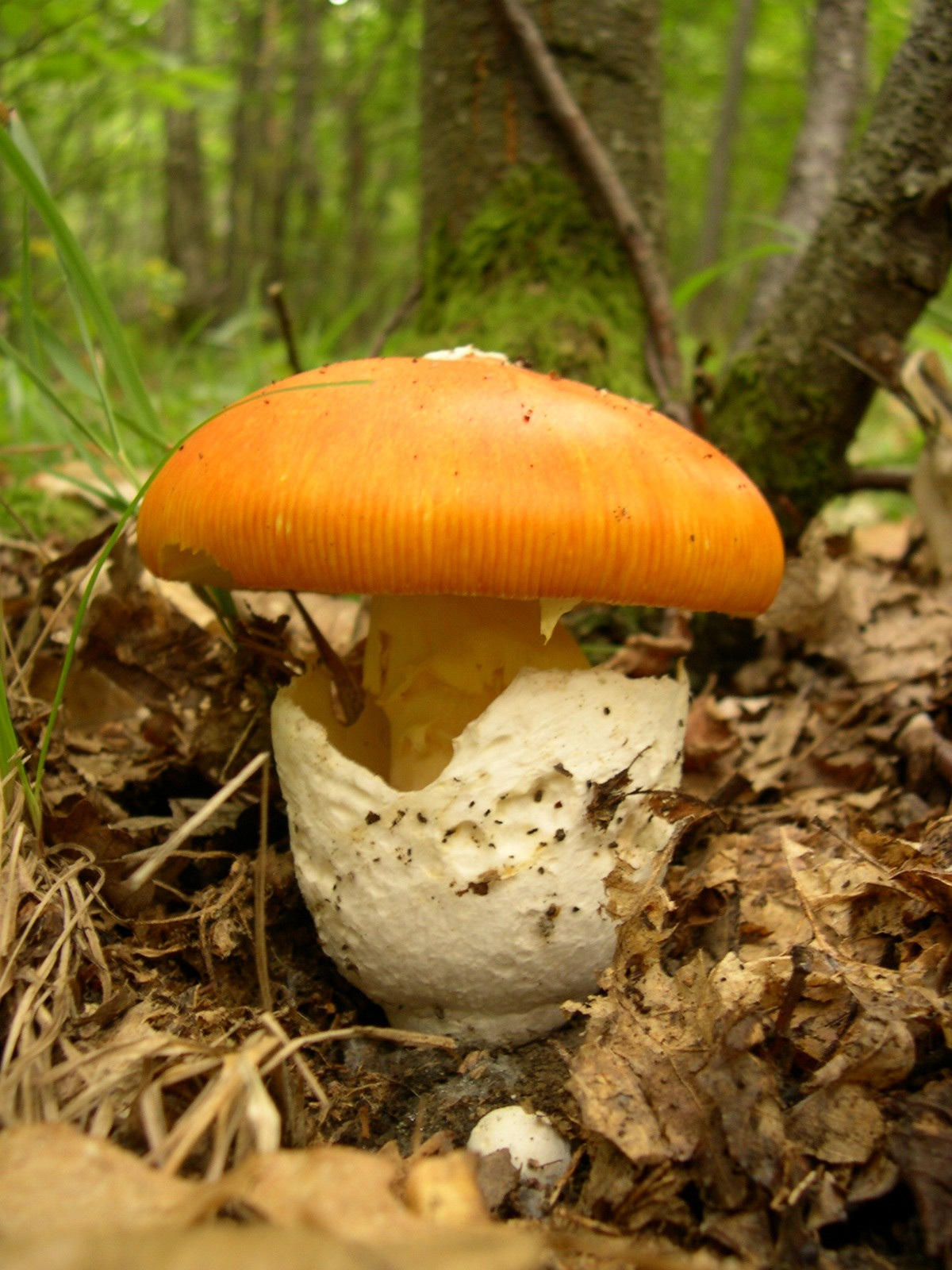
The volva is the prominent cup-shaped feature at the base of this Amanita caesarea.

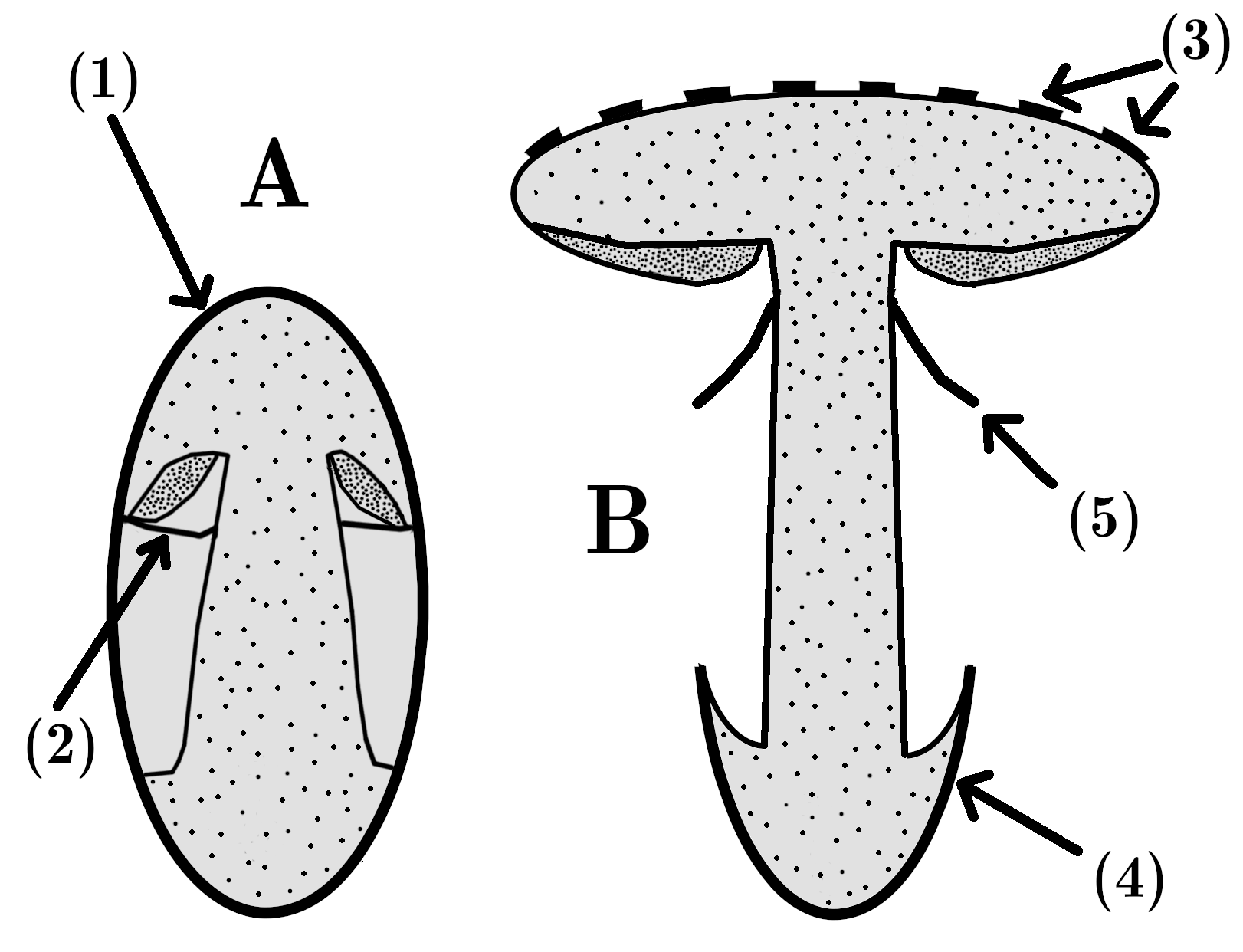
A simplified diagram of an agaric-type basidioma in (A) the early development stage, and (B) after the body is fully expanded. (1) is the universal veil, the outer layer protecting the developing basidioma; (4) is the volva, the remnant of the universal veil at the base of the basidioma.

In mycology, a volva is a cup-like structure at the base of a mushroom that is a remnant of the universal veil, or the remains of the peridium that encloses the immature fruit bodies of gasteroid fungi. This macrofeature is important in wild mushroom identification because it is an easily observed, taxonomically significant feature that frequently signifies a member of Amanitaceae. This has particular importance due to the disproportionately high number of deadly poisonous species contained within that family.

A mushroom's volva is often partially or completely buried in the ground, and therefore care must be taken to check for its presence when identifying mushrooms. Cutting or pulling mushrooms and attempting to identify them later without having noted this feature could be a fatal error.

Whilst a volva is a feature best known from Amanita species and stinkhorns such as the Phallaceae family and others in the Phallales order, it may also occur with other genera including:

- Volvariella
- Volvopluteus
- Volvanarius
- Battarrea

Some other species such as Leucocoprinus amanitoides, Leucoagaricus volvatus and Leucoagaricus bivelatus also display a volva despite this not being a typical trait for these genera.

The majority of the almost 300 species described In the Conocybe genus do not have a volva but there are a small number of species in Conocybe section Singerella which possess a small volva, though in some it may not be immediately evident as they can remain buried in dung. Conocybe species with a volva include: C. anthuriae, C. corneri, C hornana, C. locellina, C. vaginata, C. volvata, C. volviornata, C. volviradicata.

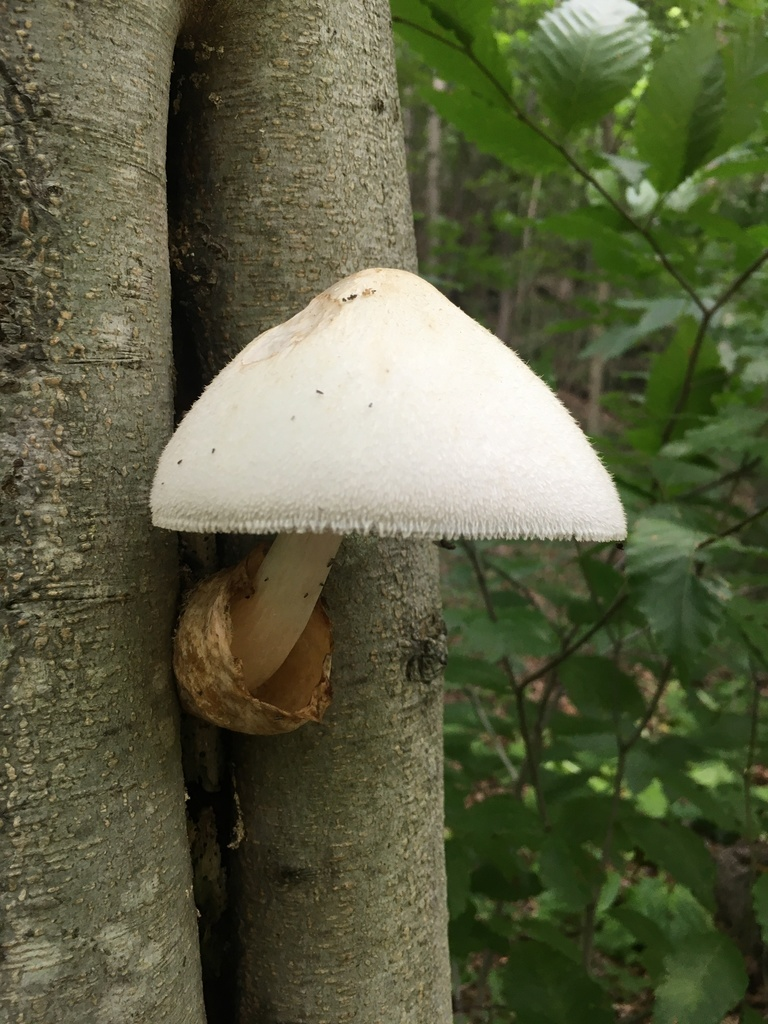
Volvariella bombycina

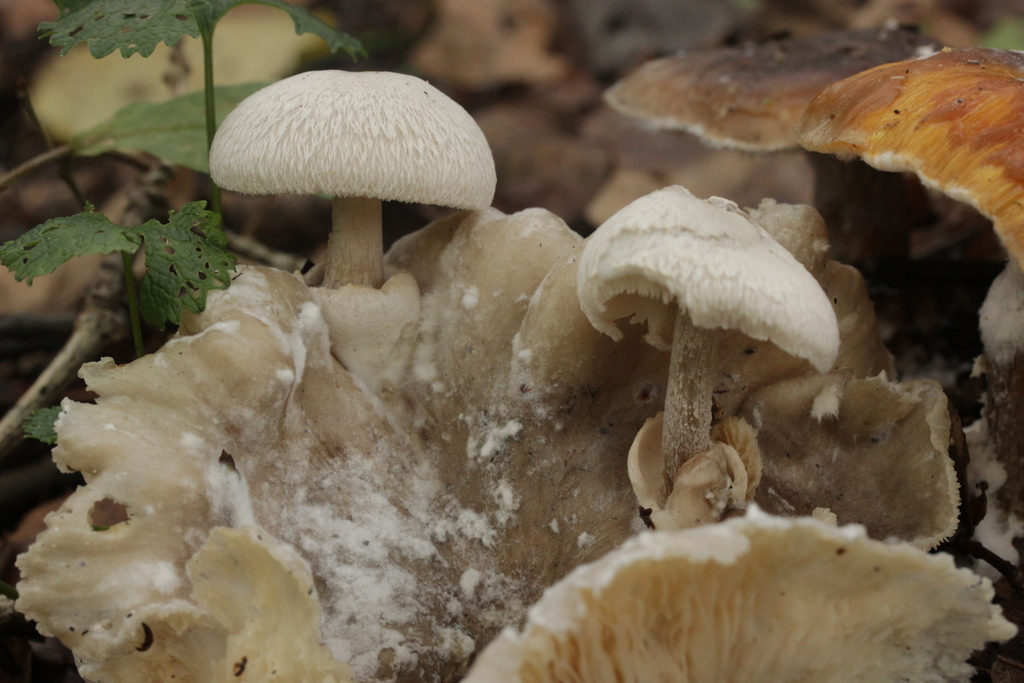
Volvariella surrecta growing parasitically

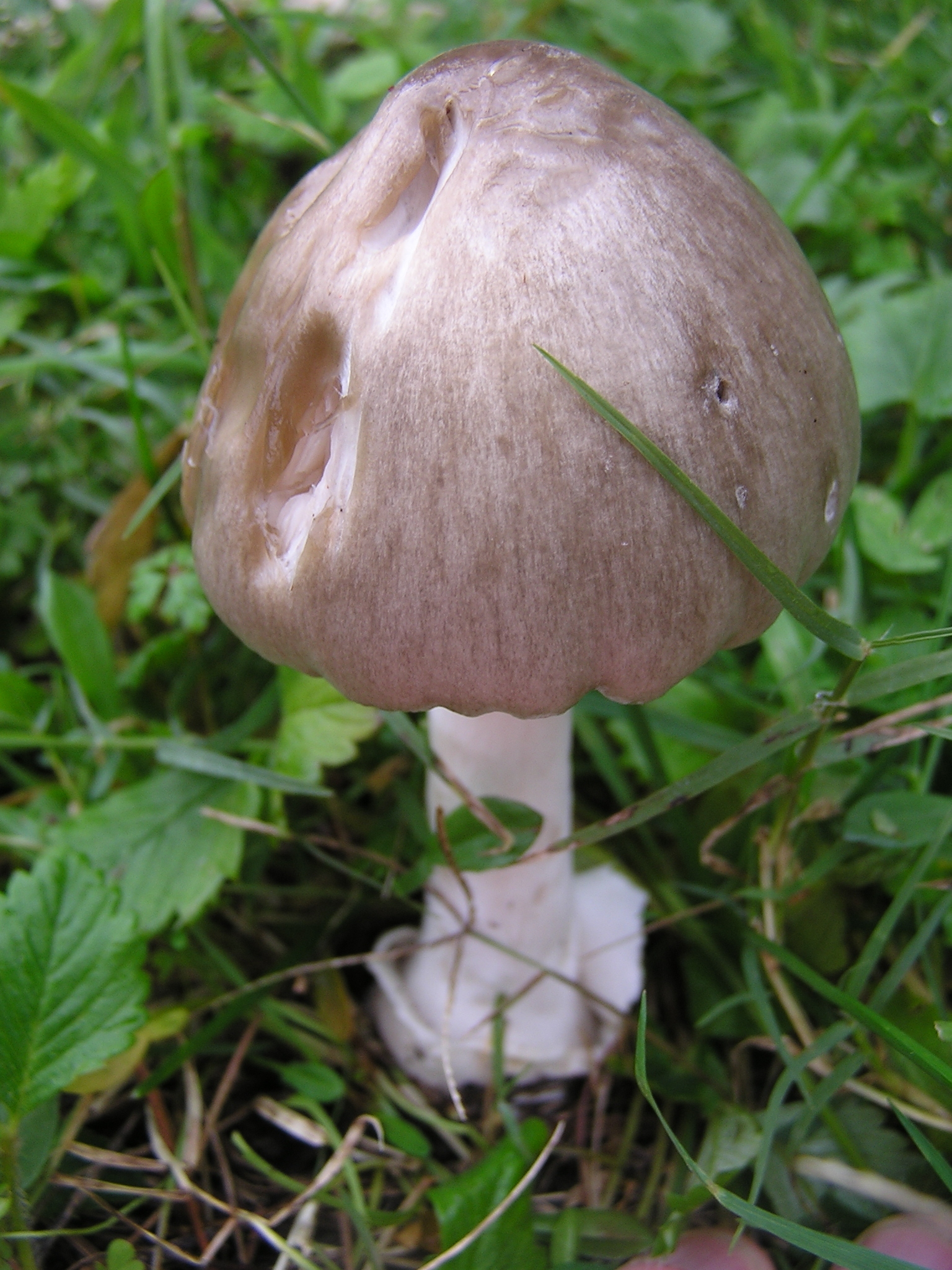
Volvopluteus gloiocephalus

== See also ==
- Annulus
- Partial veil
