= List of Pholiota species =

This is a list of species in the fungal genus Pholiota. As of January 2016, Index Fungorum accepts 370 species in Pholiota.

A B C D E F G H I J K L M N O P Q R S T U V U W X Y Z

== A ==
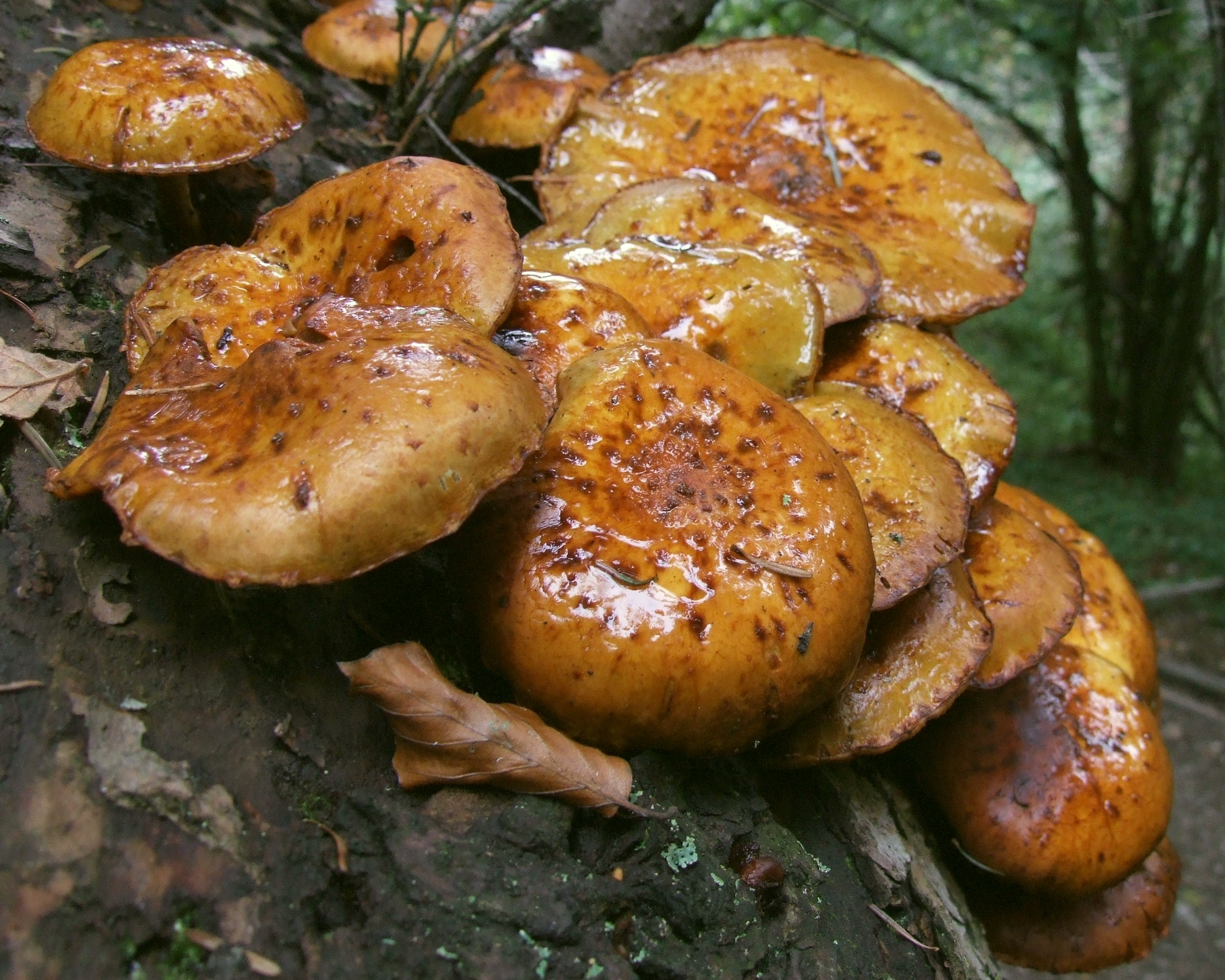
P. adiposa

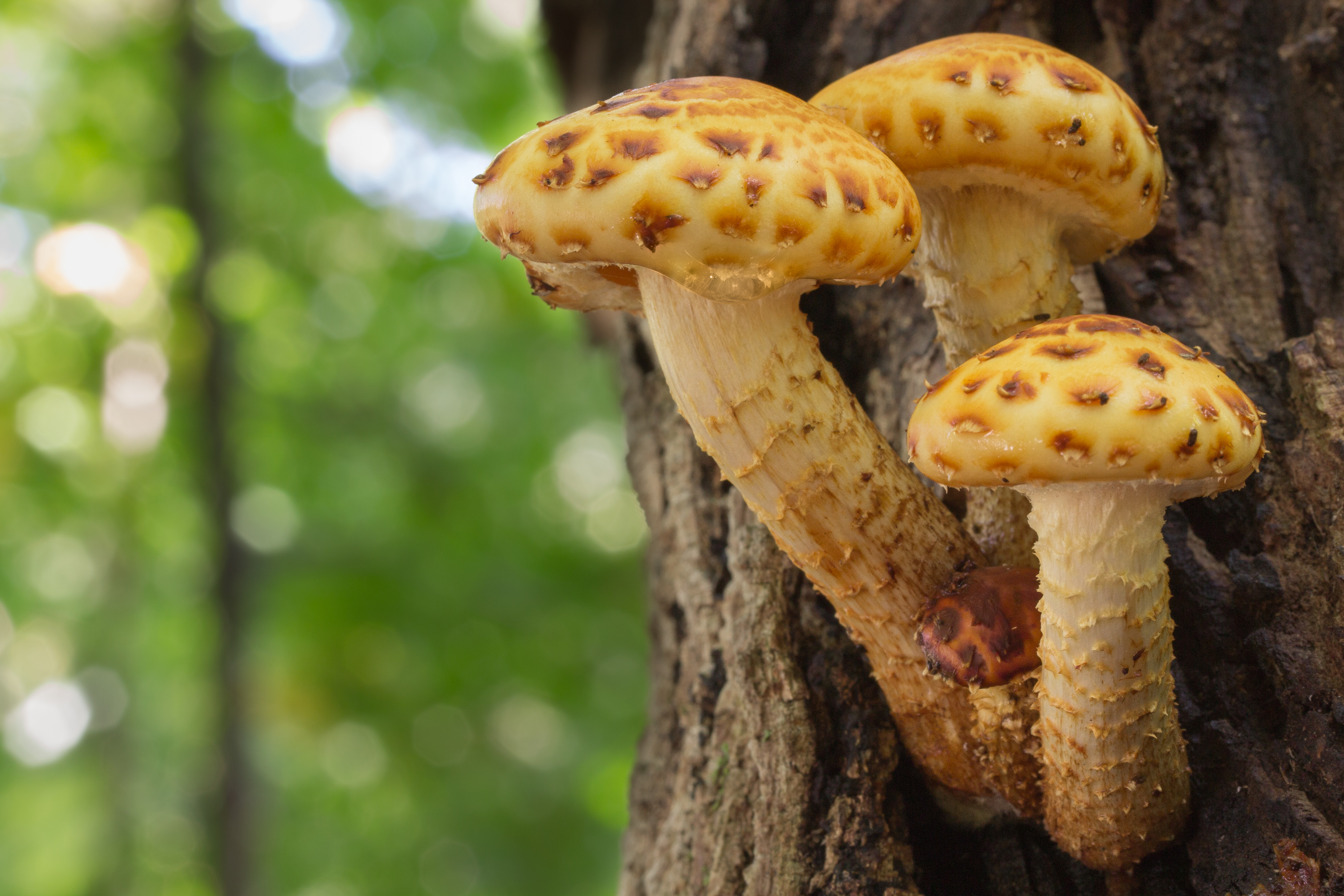
P. aurivella

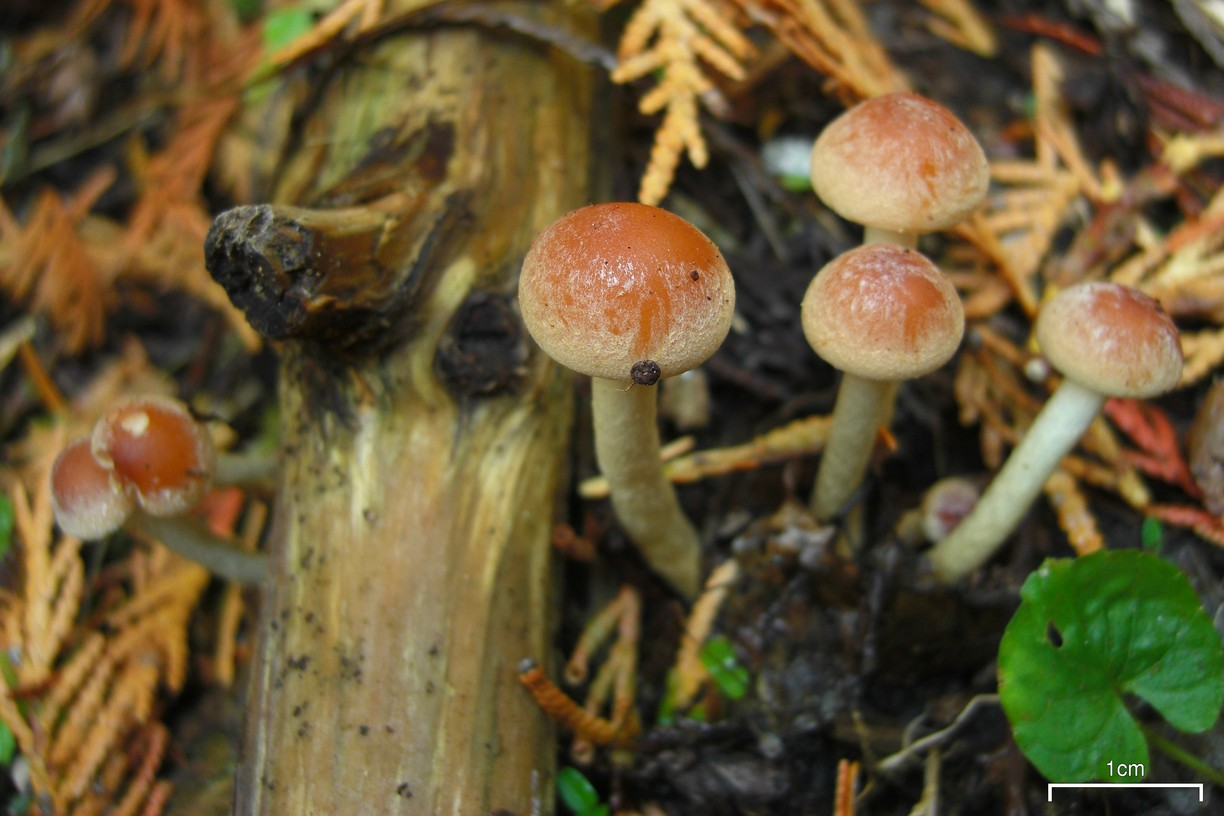
P. astragalina

- Pholiota aberrans A.H.Sm. & Hesler 1968 – United States
- Pholiota abieticola A.H.Sm. & Hesler 1968 – United States
- Pholiota abietis A.H.Sm. & Hesler 1968 – United States
- Pholiota abstrusa (Fr.) Singer 1951
- Pholiota acutoconica A.H.Sm. & Hesler 1968 – United States
- Pholiota adiposa (Batsch) P.Kumm. 1871 – Czech Republic; Great Britain
- Pholiota adirondackensis A.H.Sm. & Hesler 1968 – United States
- Pholiota aggericola (Peck) Sacc. 1887
- Pholiota agglutinata A.H.Sm. & Hesler 1968 – United States
- Pholiota aggregata Beeli 1928 – Congo
- Pholiota agrocybiformis Singer 1969
- Pholiota alabamensis (Murrill) A.H.Sm. & Hesler 1968 – United States
- Pholiota alachuana Murrill 1943 – United States
- Pholiota albo-olivasens A.H.Sm. & Hesler 1968 – United States
- Pholiota albovirescens A.H.Sm. & Hesler 1968 – United States
- Pholiota alexandrina Reichert 1921
- Pholiota alnea Singer 1952 – Great Britain
- Pholiota alnicola (Fr.) Singer 1951 – Czech Republic; Great Britain; Northern Ireland
- Pholiota alniphila (Zeller) Redhead 1984
- Pholiota angustifolia A.H.Sm. & Hesler 1968 – United States
- Pholiota angustipes (Peck) Sacc. 1887
- Pholiota anomala Peck 1895
- Pholiota apiahyna Speg. 1919
- Pholiota appendiculata Peck 1905
- Pholiota arenariobulbosa (Cleland) Grgur. 1997
- Pholiota armeniaca A.H.Sm. & Hesler 1968 – United States
- Pholiota arragonis Rick 1930
- Pholiota aschersoniana Henn. & Ruhland 1901
- Pholiota ascophora (Peck) Singer 1969
- Pholiota astragalina (Fr.) Singer 1951 – Czech Republic; Great Britain; Norway; Switzerland
- Pholiota atripes A.H.Sm. & Hesler 1968 – United States
- Pholiota aurantiaca Thesleff 1920
- Pholiota aurantioalbida Singer 1969
- Pholiota aurantioflava A.H.Sm. & Hesler 1968 – United States
- Pholiota aurivella (Batsch) P.Kumm. 1871 – Czech Republic; Great Britain; Tasmania
- Pholiota aurivelloides Overh. 1927
- Pholiota austrospumosa Hongo 1977
- Pholiota autumnalis Peck 1908
- Pholiota avellaneifolia A.H.Sm. & Hesler 1968 – United States

== B ==
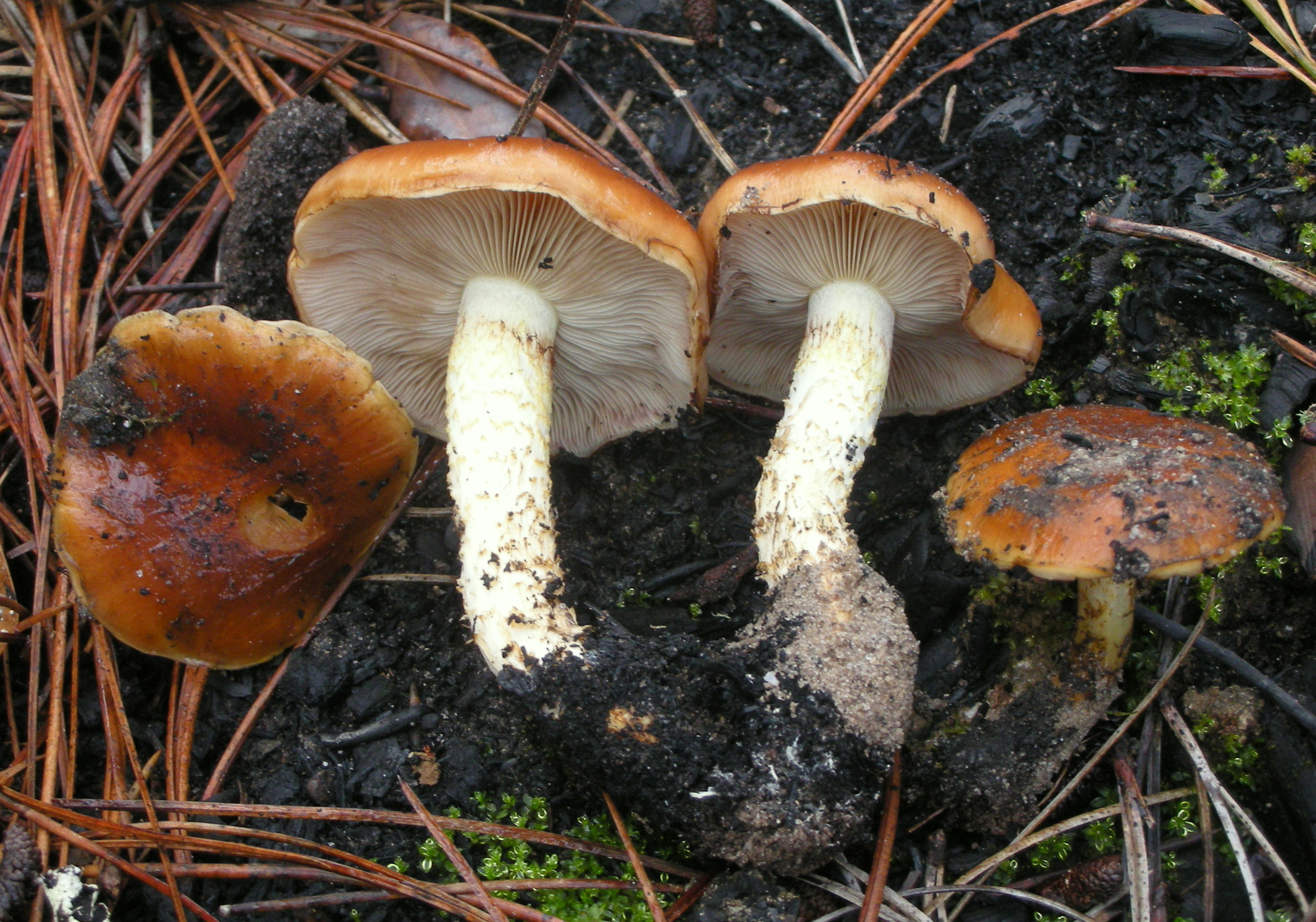
P. brunnescens

- Pholiota baeosperma Singer 1953
- Pholiota bakerensis A.H.Sm. & Hesler 1968 – United States
- Pholiota bambusina K.A.Thomas & Manim. 2001
- Pholiota baptisiae A.H.Sm. & Hesler 1968 – United States
- Pholiota barrowsii A.H.Sm. & Hesler 1968 – United States
- Pholiota basilei Mattir. 1932
- Pholiota bicincta (Kalchbr.) McAlpine 1895
- Pholiota bicolor (Speg.) Singer 1951
- Pholiota bigelowii A.H.Sm. & Hesler 1968 – United States
- Pholiota blechni Singer 1965
- Pholiota brevipes Z.S.Bi 1989
- Pholiota bridgei A.H.Sm. & Hesler 1968 – United States
- Pholiota brunnea A.H.Sm. & Hesler 1968 – United States
- Pholiota brunneoatra Rick 1930
- Pholiota brunneodisca (Peck) A.H.Sm. & Hesler 1968 – United States
- Pholiota brunnescens A.H.Sm. & Hesler 1968 – United States – Great Britain
- Pholiota burkei A.H.Sm. & Hesler 1968 – United States

== C ==
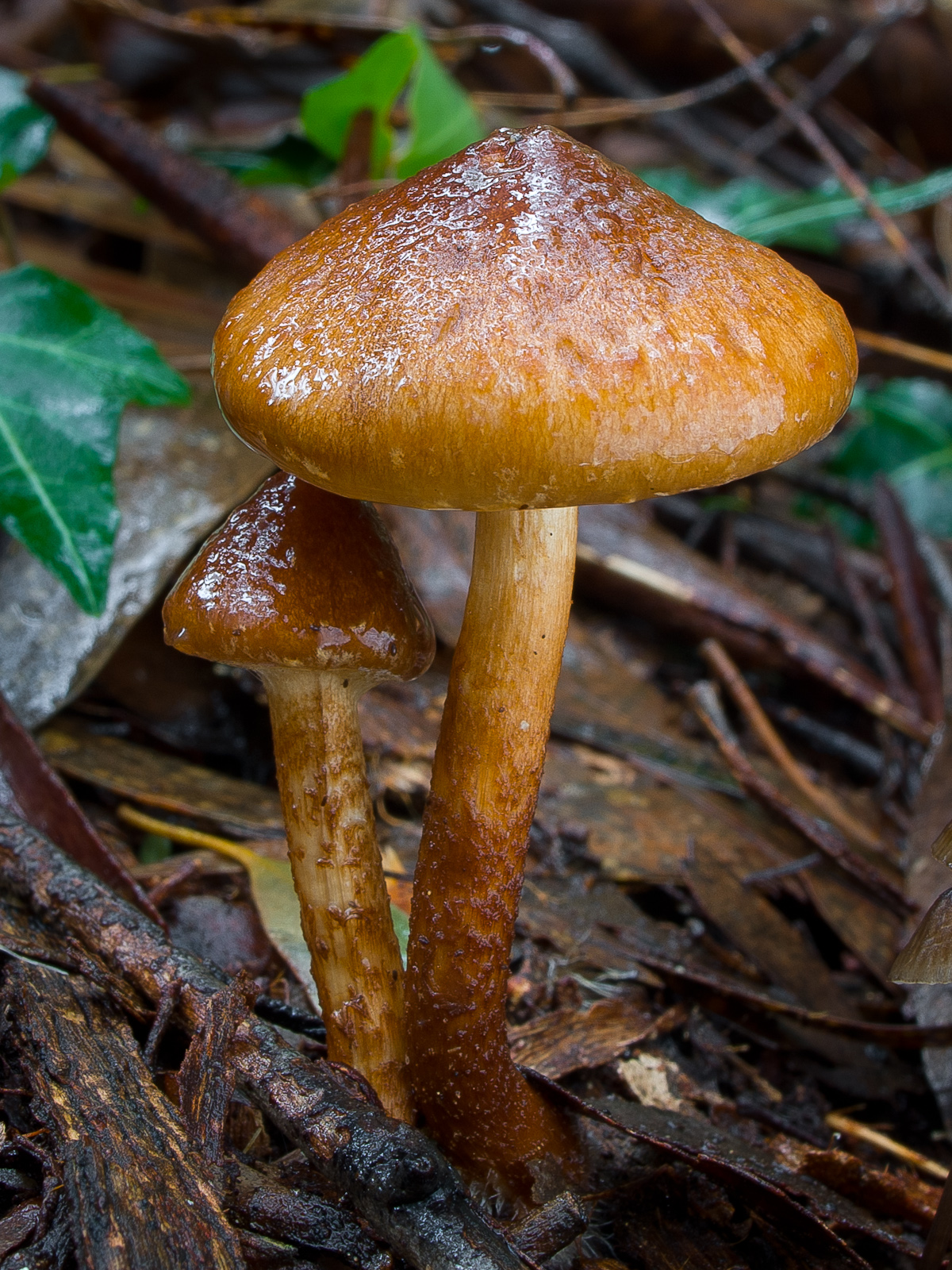
P. communis

- Pholiota caespitosa A.H.Sm. & Hesler 1968 – United States
- Pholiota calendulina Singer 1952 – Argentina
- Pholiota californica (Earle) A.H.Sm. & Hesler 1968 – United States
- Pholiota calvinii A.H.Sm. & Hesler 1968 – United States
- Pholiota canescens A.H.Sm. & Hesler 1968 – United States
- Pholiota capocystidia J.Bao Wang 1992
- Pholiota carbonaria A.H.Sm. 1944 – Great Britain; Victoria
- Pholiota carbonicola Singer 1962
- Pholiota carneola Rick 1930
- Pholiota castanea A.H.Sm. & Hesler 1968 – United States
- Pholiota catervaria (Lév.) Manjula 1983
- Pholiota cerasina Peck 1908
- Pholiota chacoensis Speg. 1926
- Pholiota chromocystis A.H.Sm. & Hesler 1968 – United States
- Pholiota chrysmoides Soop 2001 – New Zealand
- Pholiota chrysocystidiata Singer 1986
- Pholiota cinchonensis Murrill 1913
- Pholiota cincta (Cleland) Grgur. 1997
- Pholiota citrinofolia Métrod 1962
- Pholiota coloradensis A.H.Sm. & Hesler 1968 – United States
- Pholiota communis (Cleland & Cheel) Grgur. 1997 – Victoria
- Pholiota condensa (Peck) A.H.Sm. & Hesler 1968 – United States
- Pholiota conica A.H.Sm. & Hesler 1968 – United States
- Pholiota conissans (Fr.) M.M.Moser 1986 – France; Great Britain; Italy; Ontario
- Pholiota connata A.H.Sm. & Hesler 1968 – United States
- Pholiota contorta A.H.Sm. & Hesler 1968 – United States
- Pholiota corticola (Murrill) A.H.Sm. & Hesler 1968 – United States
- Pholiota cortinata (DC.) Singer 1989
- Pholiota crassipedes A.H.Sm. & Hesler 1968 – United States
- Pholiota crassivela (Speg.) Speg. 1887
- Pholiota cubensis Earle 1906 – São Paulo
- Pholiota curcuma (Berk. & M.A. Curtis) A.H.Sm. & Hesler 1968 – United States
- Pholiota cyathicola (Murrill) A.H.Sm. & Hesler 1968 – United States
- Pholiota cystidiata Natarajan & C. Ravindran 2003 – India

== D ==
- Pholiota davidsonii A.H.Sm. & Hesler 1968 – United States
- Pholiota deceptiva A.H.Sm. & Hesler 1968 – United States
- Pholiota decorata (Murrill) A.H.Sm. & Hesler 1968 – United States
- Pholiota decurrens Velen. 1921
- Pholiota decussata (Fr.) M.M.Moser 1967 – Great Britain
- Pholiota depauperata (Singer & A.H.Sm.) A.H.Sm. & Hesler 1968 – United States
- Pholiota destruens Gillet (edible)
- Pholiota dinghuensis Z.S.Bi 1985
- Pholiota disrupta (Cooke & Massee) McAlpine 1895
- Pholiota drummondii (Berk.) Pegler 1965
- Pholiota duroides Peck 1908

== E ==
- Pholiota ealaensis Beeli 1928 – Congo
- Pholiota elegans Jacobsson 1991 – Czech Republic; Sweden
- Pholiota engleriana Henn. 1893
- Pholiota eucalyptorum (Cleland) Singer 1952

== F ==
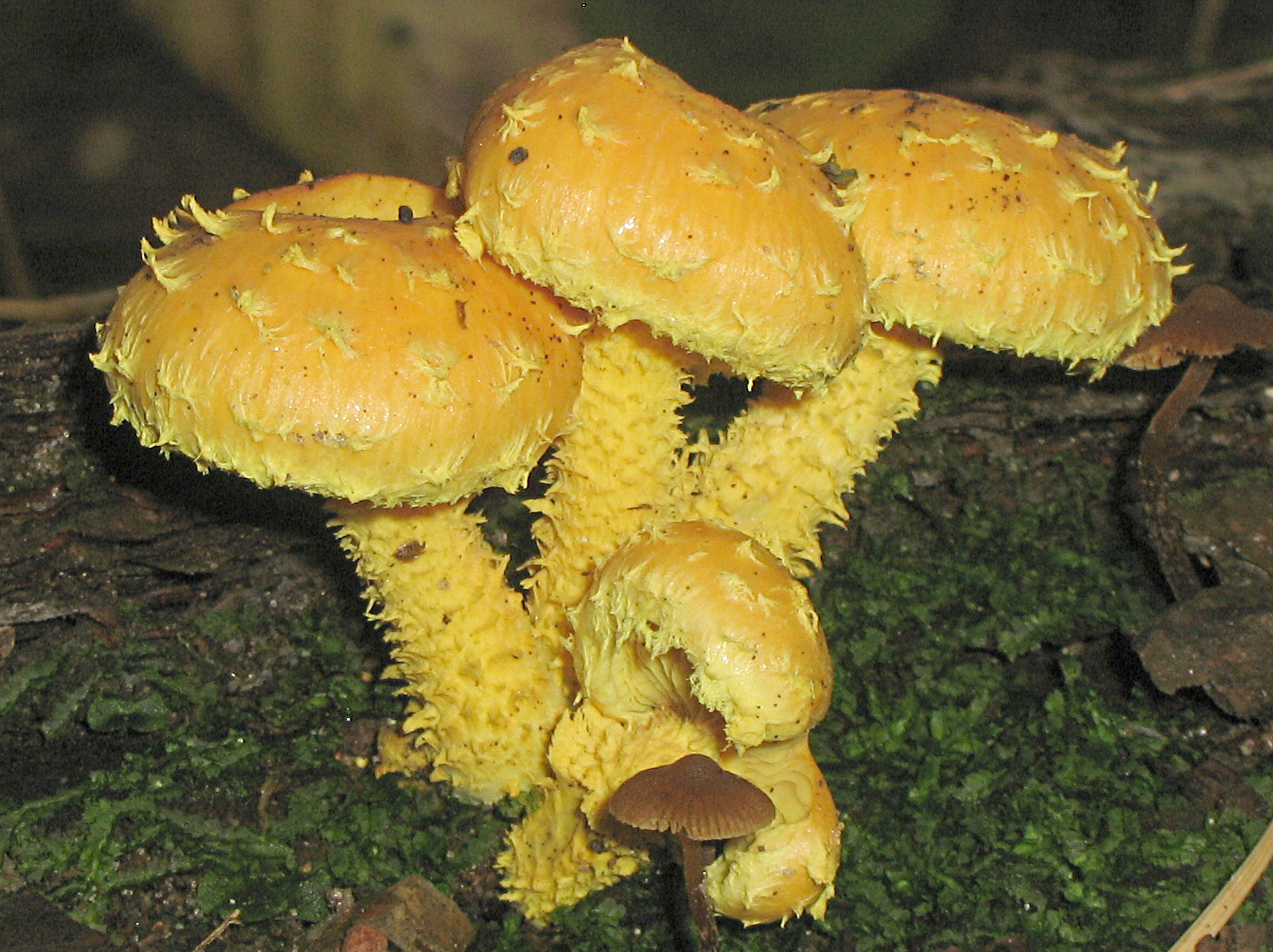
P. flammans

- Pholiota fallax Velen. 1921
- Pholiota ferruginea A.H.Sm. & Hesler 1968 – United States
- Pholiota ferrugineolutescens A.H.Sm. & Hesler 1968 – United States
- Pholiota fibrillosipes (Murrill) A.H.Sm. & Hesler 1968 – United States
- Pholiota fieldiana Y.S.Chang & A.K.Mills 2006 – Australia
- Pholiota flammans (Batsch) P.Kumm. 1871 – Germany; Great Britain; Northern Ireland; Switzerland
- Pholiota flavescens A.H.Sm. & Hesler 1968 – United States
- Pholiota flavida (Schaeff.) Singer 1951
- Pholiota flavopallida A.H.Sm. & Hesler 1968 – United States
- Pholiota floridana Murrill 1943
- Pholiota foedata (Peck) A.H.Sm. & Hesler 1968 – United States
- Pholiota foetans Bat. & A.F.Vital 1955
- Pholiota formosa Speg. 1926
- Pholiota fragilissima Rick 1926
- Pholiota freindlingiae (Singer) Singer 1951
- Pholiota frusticola (Berk.) Pegler 1965
- Pholiota fulvella (Peck) A.H.Sm. & Hesler 1968 – United States
- Pholiota fulviconica (Murrill) A.H.Sm. & Hesler 1968 – United States
- Pholiota fulvodisca A.H.Sm. & Hesler 1968 – United States
- Pholiota fulvosquamosa Peck 1903
- Pholiota fulvozonata A.H.Sm. & Hesler 1968 – United States
- Pholiota furcata Overh. 1924

== G ==
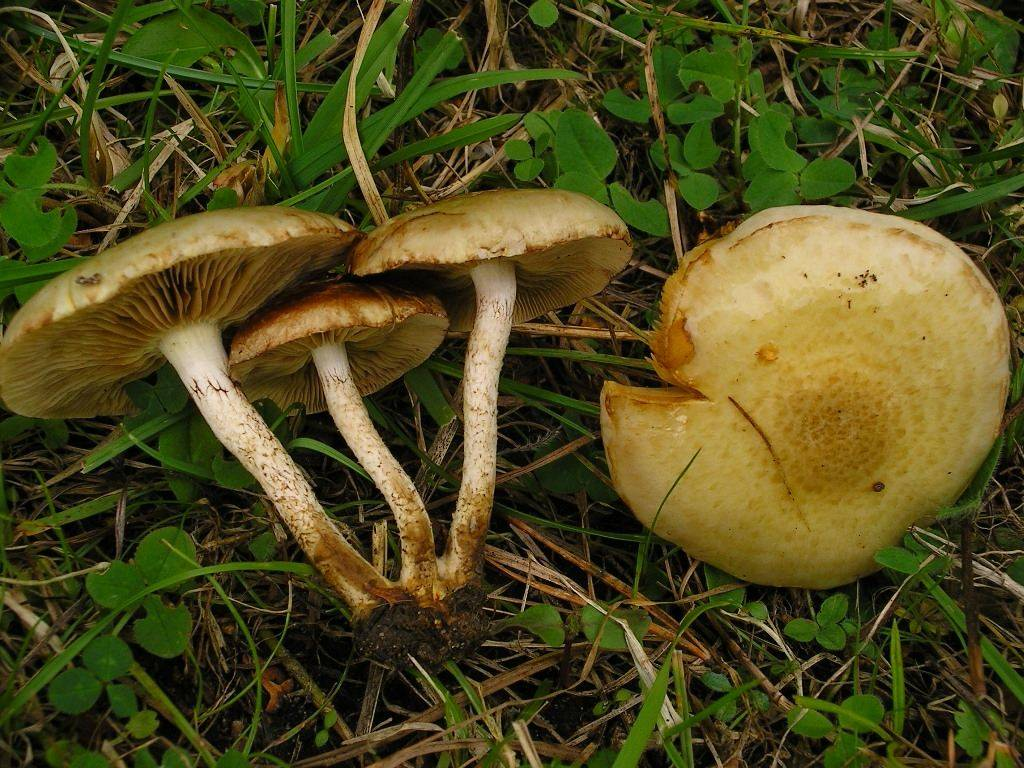
P. gummosa

- Pholiota galapagensis Pegler 1981 – Galapagos Islands
- Pholiota galerinoides A.H.Sm. & Hesler 1968 – United States
- Pholiota gigantea Naveau 1923
- Pholiota glaucellae Vouaux 1914
- Pholiota glutinigera Singer 1960
- Pholiota glutinosa (Massee) E.Horak 1971
- Pholiota glutinosipes Singer 1961
- Pholiota gollani Henn. 1901
- Pholiota goossensiae Beeli 1928 – Congo
- Pholiota graminum Cleland 1933 – Australia
- Pholiota granulosa (Peck) A.H.Sm. & Hesler 1968 – United States
- Pholiota granulosoverrucosa Henn. 1901
- Pholiota graveolens (Peck) A.H.Sm. & Hesler 1968 – United States
- Pholiota gregariiformis (Murrill) A.H.Sm. & Hesler 1968 – United States
- Pholiota gruberi A.H.Sm. & Hesler 1968 – United States
- Pholiota gummosa (Lasch) Singer 1951 – Great Britain; Northern Ireland; Portugal; Switzerland
- Pholiota gymnopiloides Raithelh. 1974
- Pholiota gymnopodia (Bull.) A.F.M.Reijnders 1998

== H ==
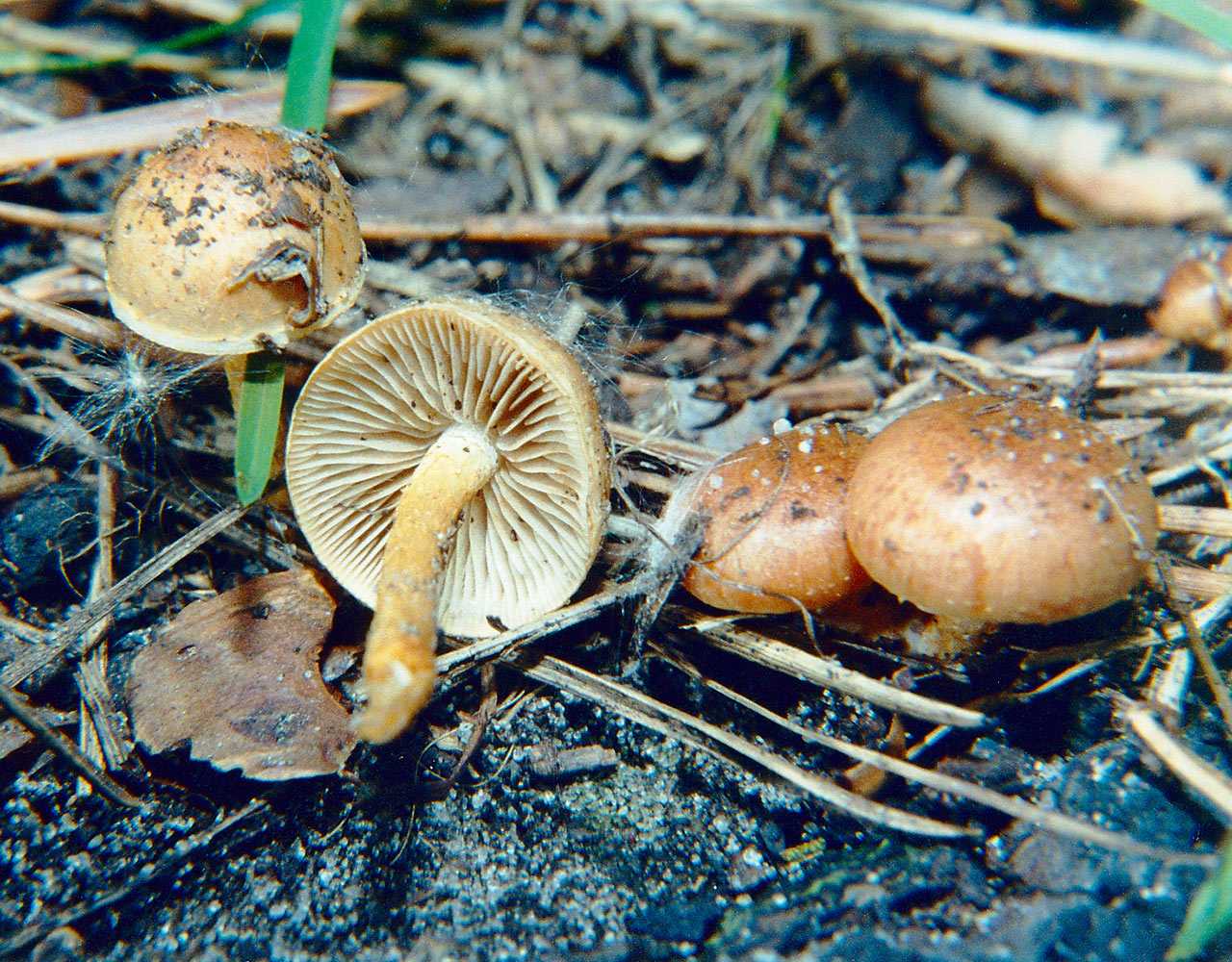
P. highlandensis

- Pholiota harenosa A.H.Sm. & Hesler 1968 – United States
- Pholiota henningsii (Bres.) P.D.Orton 1960
- Pholiota hepatica Massee 1914
- Pholiota heteroclita (Fr.) Quél. 1872
- Pholiota hiemalis A.H.Sm. & Hesler 1968 – United States
- Pholiota humii A.H.Sm. & Hesler 1968 – United States
- Pholiota hymaeneicola Beeli 1928 – Congo
- Pholiota hypholomoides (Murrill) A.H.Sm. & Hesler 1968 – United States

== I ==
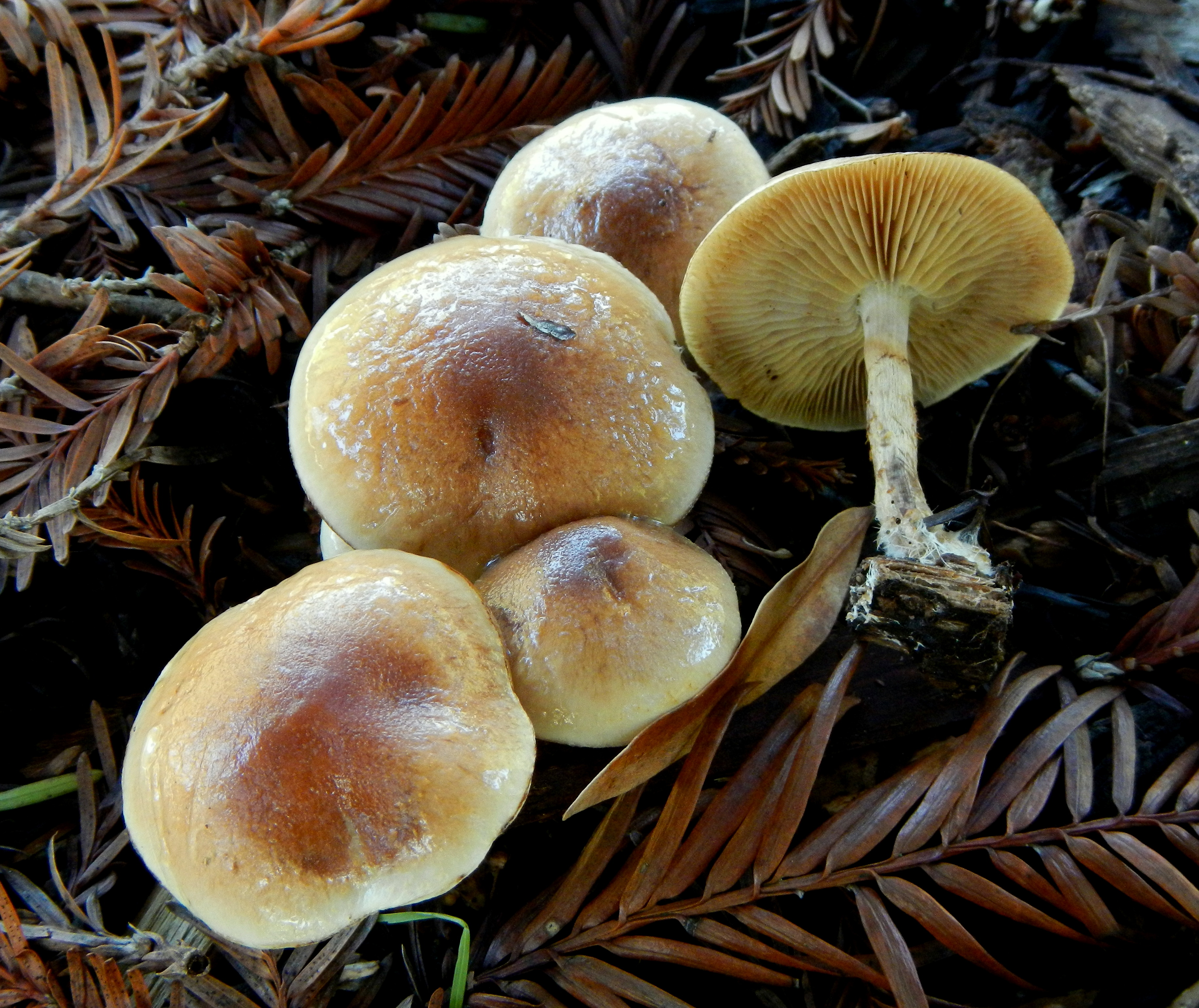
P. iterata

- Pholiota imperfecta Cleland 1933 – Australia
- Pholiota impudica Speg. 1889
- Pholiota indecens (Peck) Sacc. 1887
- Pholiota indica Massee 1901
- Pholiota innocua A.H.Sm. & Hesler 1968 – United States
- Pholiota irazuensis Singer 1989
- Pholiota iterata A.H.Sm. & Hesler 1968 – United States

== J ==
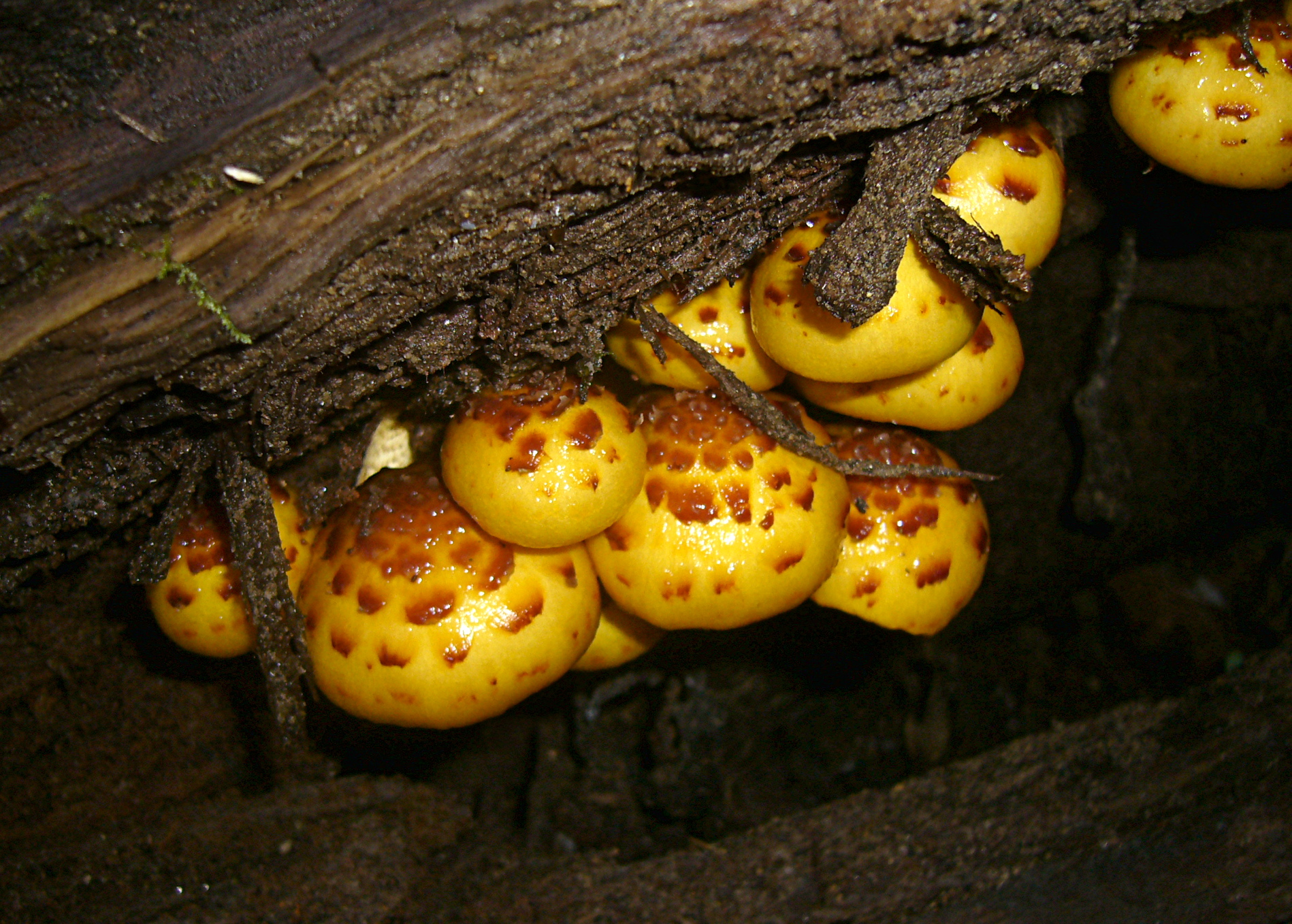
P. jahnii

- Pholiota jahnii Tjall.-Beuk. & Bas 1986 – Great Britain
- Pholiota jalapensis (Murrill) A.H.Sm. & Hesler 1968 – United States
- Pholiota johnsoniana (Peck) G.F.Atk. 1918

== K ==
- Pholiota kalmicola (Murrill) A.H.Sm. & Hesler 1968 – United States
- Pholiota kauffmaniana A.H.Sm. 1944
- Pholiota kodiakensis A.H.Sm. & Hesler 1968 – United States
- Pholiota kubickae Singer & Clémençon 1971
- Pholiota kummeriana Henn. 1900 – Africa

== L ==
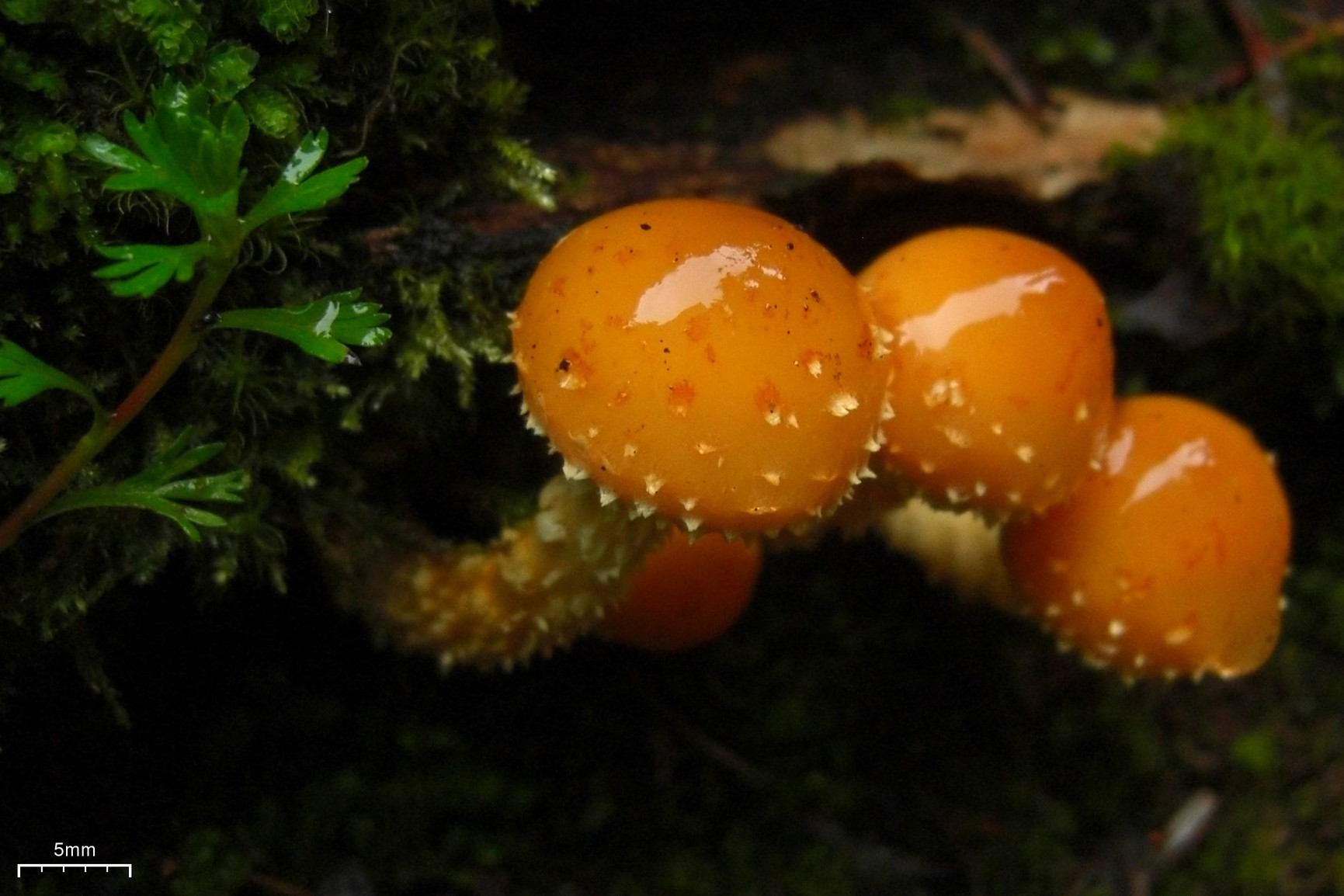
P. limonella

- Pholiota lactea A.H.Sm. & Hesler 1968 – United States
- Pholiota lanaripes Rick 1961
- Pholiota langei Singer 1945
- Pholiota lapponica (Fr.) Singer 1951
- Pholiota lenta (Pers.) Singer 1951 – Czech Republic; Great Britain; Italy; Spain
- Pholiota leptographa Sacc. 1914
- Pholiota leptopoda Speg. 1889
- Pholiota limonella (Peck) Sacc. 1887 – Czech Republic; Great Britain
- Pholiota linicola Bubák 1914
- Pholiota livistonae S.Ito & S.Imai 1940 – Japan
- Pholiota lubrica (Pers.) Singer 1951 – Great Britain
- Pholiota lucifera (Lasch) Quél. 1872 – Czech Republic; Great Britain
- Pholiota lundbergii Jacobsson 1997
- Pholiota lurida A.H.Sm. & Hesler 1968 – United States
- Pholiota lutaria (Maire) Kuyper & Tjall.-Beuk. 1986
- Pholiota luteobadia A.H.Sm. & Hesler 1968 – United States
- Pholiota luteola A.H.Sm. & Hesler 1968 – United States
- Pholiota lutescens A.H.Sm. & Hesler 1968 – United States

== M ==
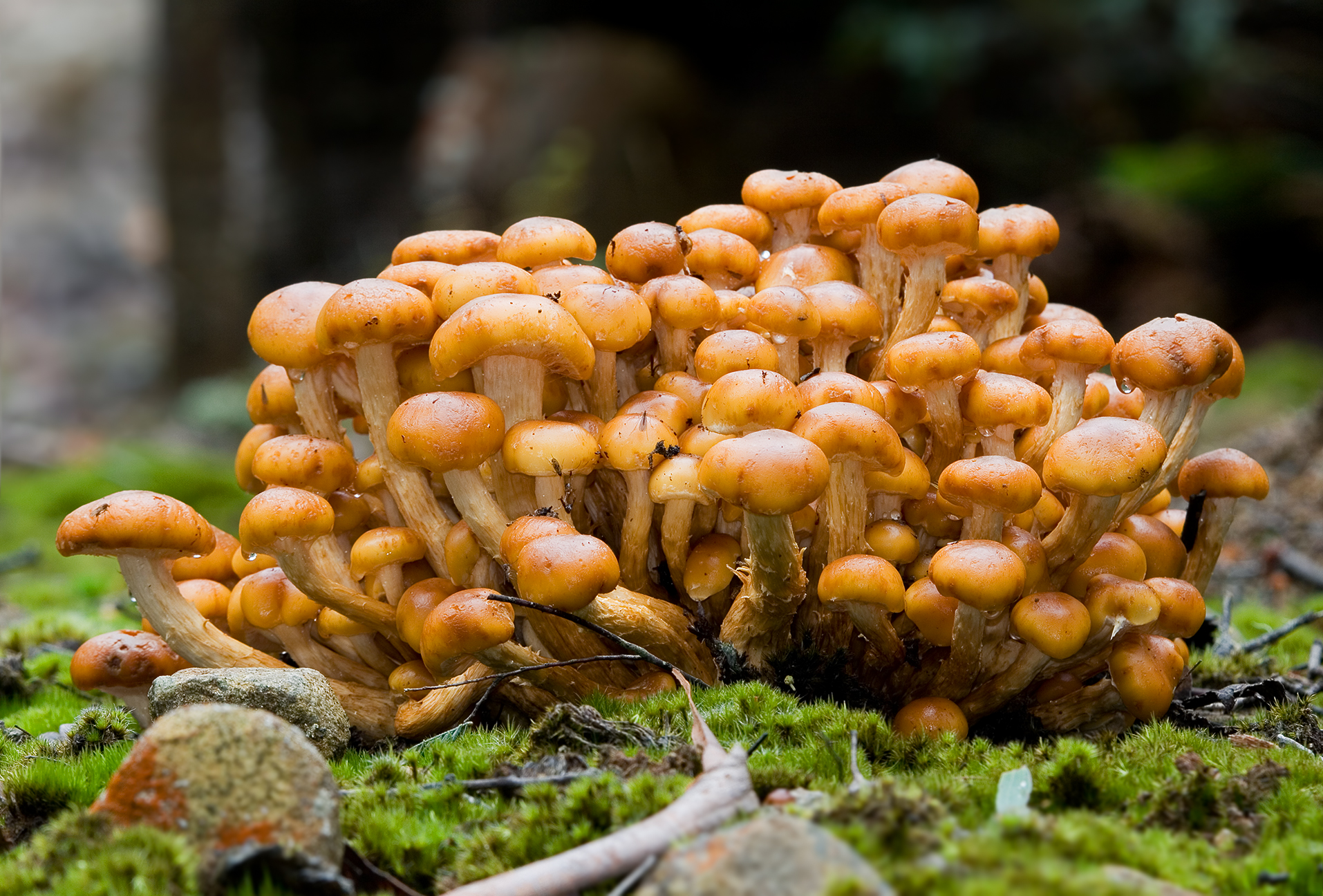
P. malicola

- Pholiota maackiae Singer 1948
- Pholiota macmurphyi Murrill 1912
- Pholiota macrocystis A.H.Sm. & Hesler 1968 – United States
- Pholiota mahabaleshwarensis Sathe & S.D.Deshp. 1980
- Pholiota majalis Singer 1969
- Pholiota malicola (Kauffman) A.H.Sm. 1934 – Tasmania
- Pholiota mammillata Velen. 1921
- Pholiota marangania (Grgur.) Matheny & Bougher 2010
- Pholiota marginella Peck 1898
- Pholiota marthae Singer 1969
- Pholiota martinicensis Pat. 1903
- Pholiota maximovici Velen. 1921
- Pholiota megalosperma Singer 1953
- Pholiota melaphila Raithelh. 1974
- Pholiota melliodora A.H.Sm. & Hesler 1968 – United States
- Pholiota metallica Donoso 1981
- Pholiota microcarpa Singer 1969
- Pholiota milleri A.H.Sm. & Hesler 1968 – United States
- Pholiota mixta (Fr.) Kuyper & Tjall.-Beuk. 1986
- Pholiota molesta A.H.Sm. & Hesler 1968 – United States
- Pholiota mollicula Banning & Peck 1891
- Pholiota molliscorium (Cooke & Massee) Sacc. 1891
- Pholiota montana Singer 1965
- Pholiota montevideensis Speg. 1926
- Pholiota mucigera Holec & Niemelä 2000 – Finland
- Pholiota mucosa Velen. 1921
- Pholiota multicingulata E.Horak 1983 – Tasmania; Victoria
- Pholiota muricella (Fr.) Bon 1985
- Pholiota mutabilis, an alternate name for Kuehneromyces mutabilis
- Pholiota myosotis Singer
- Pholiota myxacioides Singer 1969

== N ==
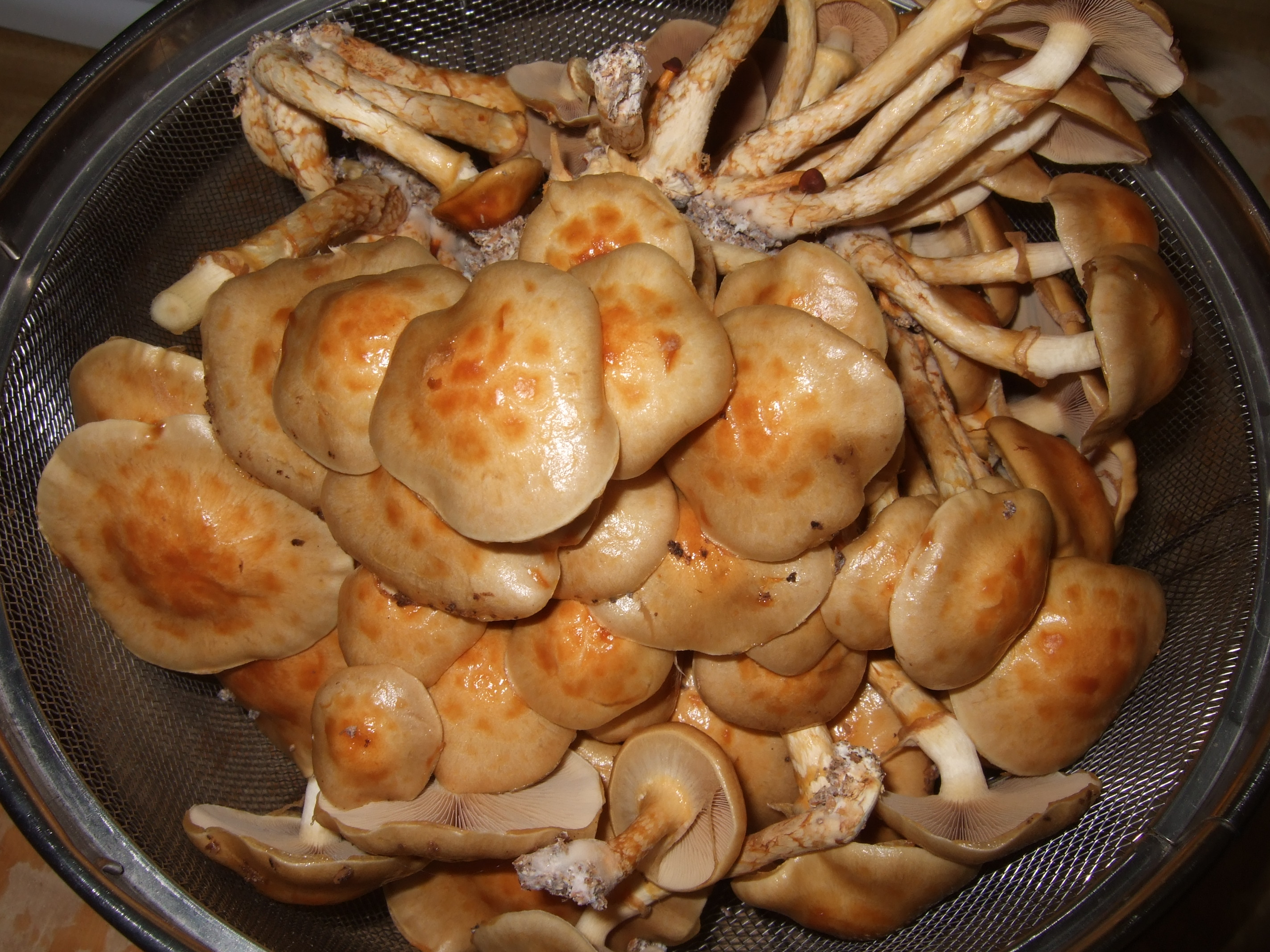
P. nameko

- Pholiota nameko (T.Itô) S.Ito & S.Imai 1933
- Pholiota nana E.Horak 1962
- Pholiota naucorioides Singer 1955
- Pholiota nguelensis Henn. 1900 – Africa
- Pholiota nigripes A.H.Sm. & Hesler 1968 – United States
- Pholiota nigrosetosa Velen. 1930
- Pholiota novembris Singer 1969
- Pholiota nymaniana (Henn.) Sacc. & P.Syd. 1902

== O ==
- Pholiota obscura A.H.Sm. & Hesler 1968 – United States
- Pholiota occidentalis A.H.Sm. & Hesler 1968 – United States
- Pholiota ochrochlora (Fr.) P.D.Orton 1960 – Great Britain
- Pholiota ochropallida Romagn. ex Bon 1986
- Pholiota ochrospora Raithelh. 1974
- Pholiota odoratissima A.Blytt 1905
- Pholiota olivaceocoriacea Rick 1930
- Pholiota olivaceodisca A.H.Sm. & Hesler 1968 – United States
- Pholiota olivaceophylla A.H.Sm. & Hesler 1968 – United States
- Pholiota olympiana (A.H.Sm.) A.H.Sm. & Hesler 1968 – United States
- Pholiota oregonensis (Murrill) Murrill 1912
- Pholiota ornatula (Murrill) A.H.Sm. & Hesler 1968 – United States

== P ==
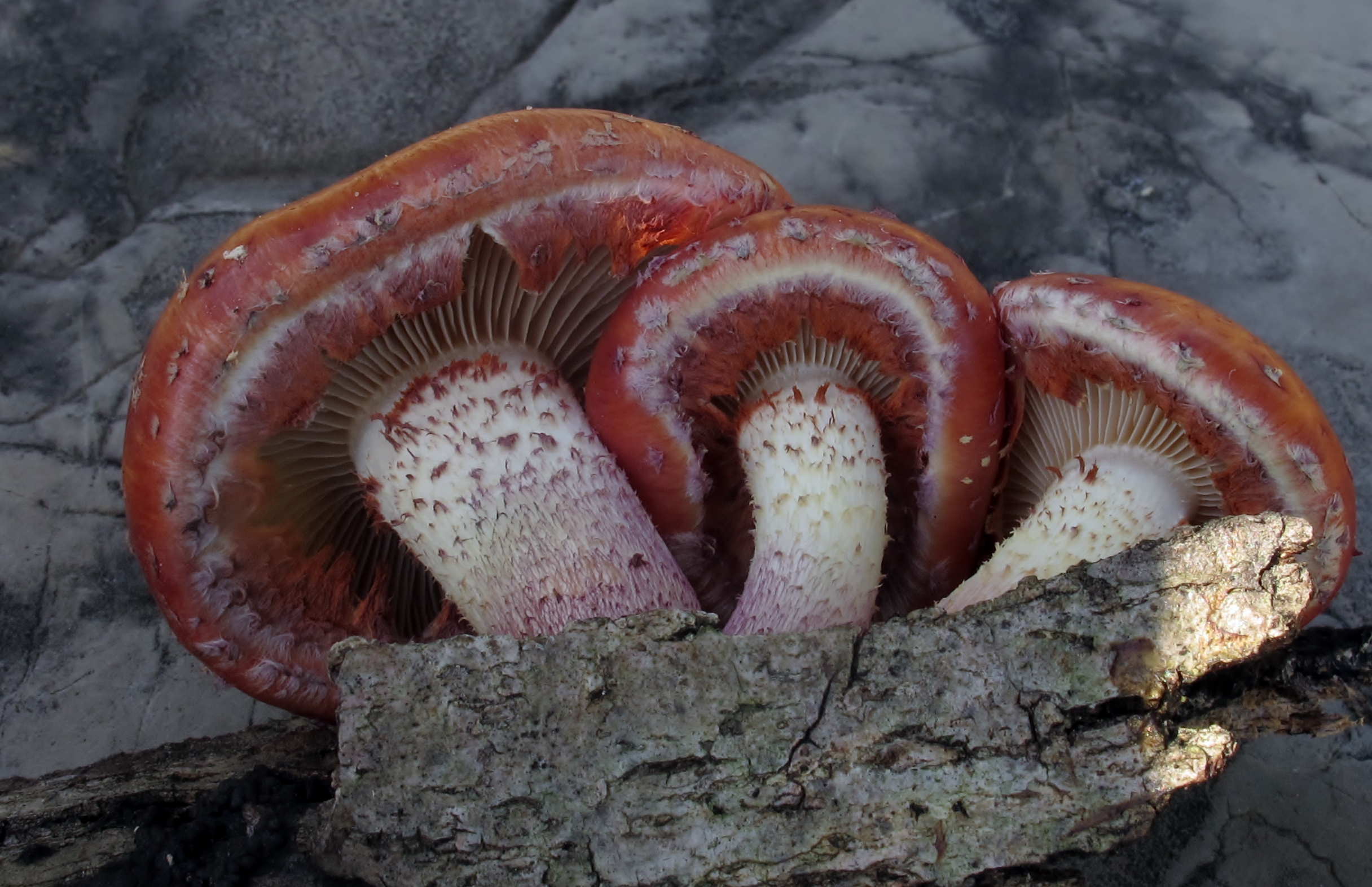
Pholiota polychroa

- Pholiota pallida A.H.Sm. & Hesler 1968 – United States
- Pholiota paludosella (G.F.Atk.) A.H.Sm. & Hesler 1968 – United States
- Pholiota paradoxa Naveau 1923
- Pholiota parva A.Pearson 1950
- Pholiota parvula W.F.Chiu 1968
- Pholiota pattersoniae (Murrill) Redhead 1984
- Pholiota paulensis Henn. 1908
- Pholiota peleae E.Horak & Desjardin 1996 – Hawaii
- Pholiota penningtoniana A.H.Sm. & Hesler 1968 – United States
- Pholiota perniciosa A.H.Sm. & Hesler 1968 – United States
- Pholiota phlebophora Pat. 1909
- Pholiota phlegmatica (Berk.) Manjula 1983 – Sikkim
- Pholiota phoenicis Sacc. 1917
- Pholiota piceina (Murrill) A.H.Sm. & Hesler 1968 – United States
- Pholiota pityrodes (F.Brig.) Holec 2001
- Pholiota platensis Speg. 1898
- Pholiota polychroa (Berk.) A.H.Sm. & H.J.Brodie 1935
- Pholiota populicola A.H.Sm. & Hesler 1968 – United States
- Pholiota privigna (Speg.) Singer 1961
- Pholiota proba Herp. 1912 – Europe
- Pholiota prolixa A.H.Sm. & Hesler 1968 – United States
- Pholiota psathyrelloides Singer 1969
- Pholiota pseudoblattaria Speg. 1898
- Pholiota pseudoerebia A.Pearson 1950
- Pholiota pseudofascicularis Speg. 1898
- Pholiota pseudograveolens A.H.Sm. & Hesler 1968 – United States
- Pholiota pseudohypholoma Velen. 1921
- Pholiota pseudolimulata A.H.Sm. & Hesler 1968 – United States
- Pholiota pseudomarginata Hruby 1930 – Europe
- Pholiota pseudopulchella A.H.Sm. & Hesler 1968 – United States
- Pholiota pseudosiparia A.H.Sm. & Hesler 1968 – United States
- Pholiota pudica (Bull.) Gillet 1876
- Pholiota pulchella A.H.Sm. & Hesler 1968 – United States
- Pholiota punctata (Cleland) Grgur. 1997
- Pholiota pusilla Rick 1919

== R ==
- Pholiota retiphylla G.F.Atk. 1918
- Pholiota rhombifolia Herp. 1912 – Europe
- Pholiota rigelliae Velen. 1921
- Pholiota rigidipes Peck 1912
- Pholiota rivulosa A.H.Sm. & Hesler 1968 – United States
- Pholiota romagnesiana A.H.Sm. & Hesler 1968 – United States
- Pholiota rosea Rick 1919
- Pholiota rostrata Velen. 1921
- Pholiota rubecula Banning & Peck 1891
- Pholiota rubra C.S.Bi & Loh 1985 – China
- Pholiota rubronigra A.H.Sm. & Hesler 1968 – United States
- Pholiota rudis Rick 1961
- Pholiota rufodisca A.H.Sm. & Hesler 1968 – United States

== S ==
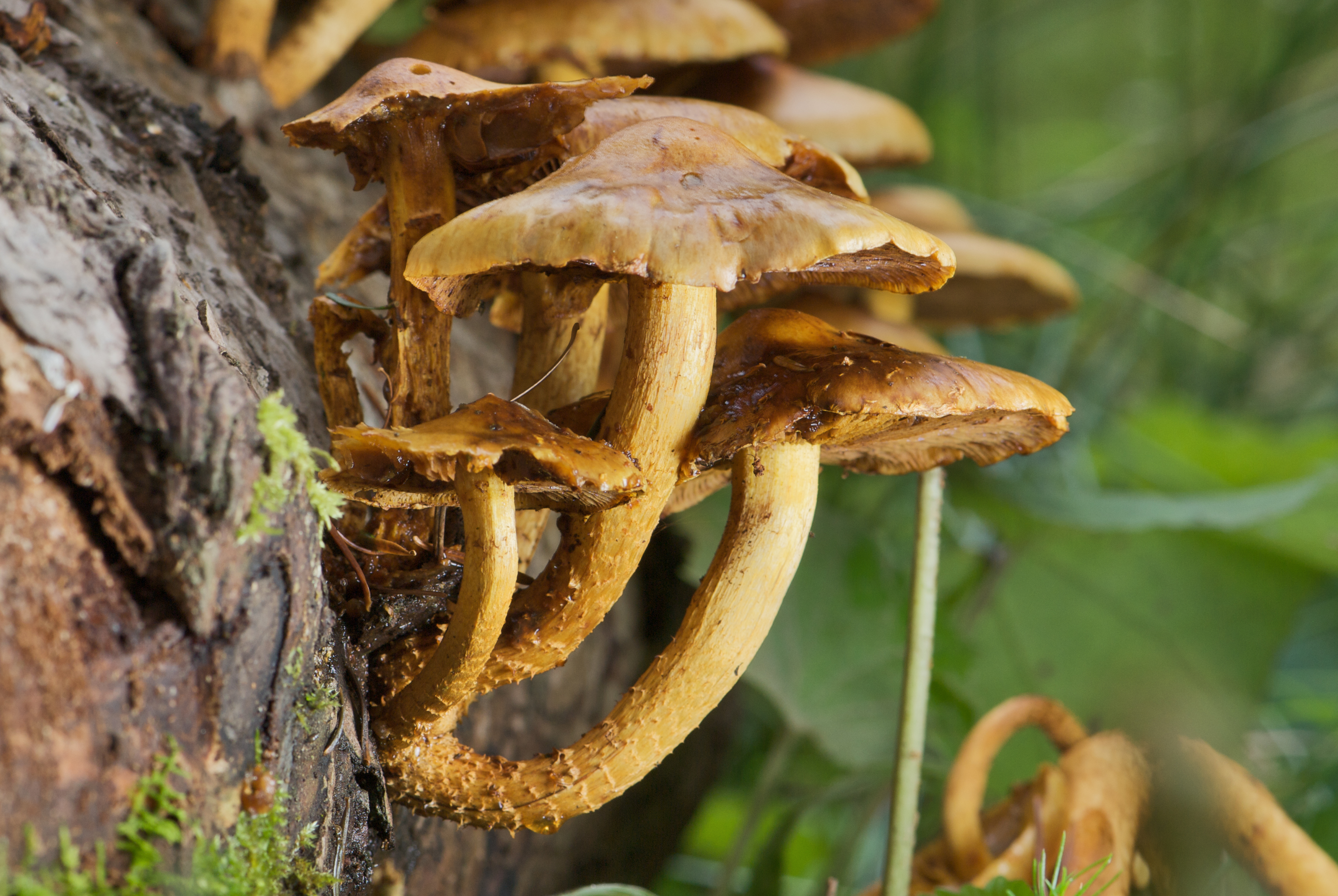
P. spumosa

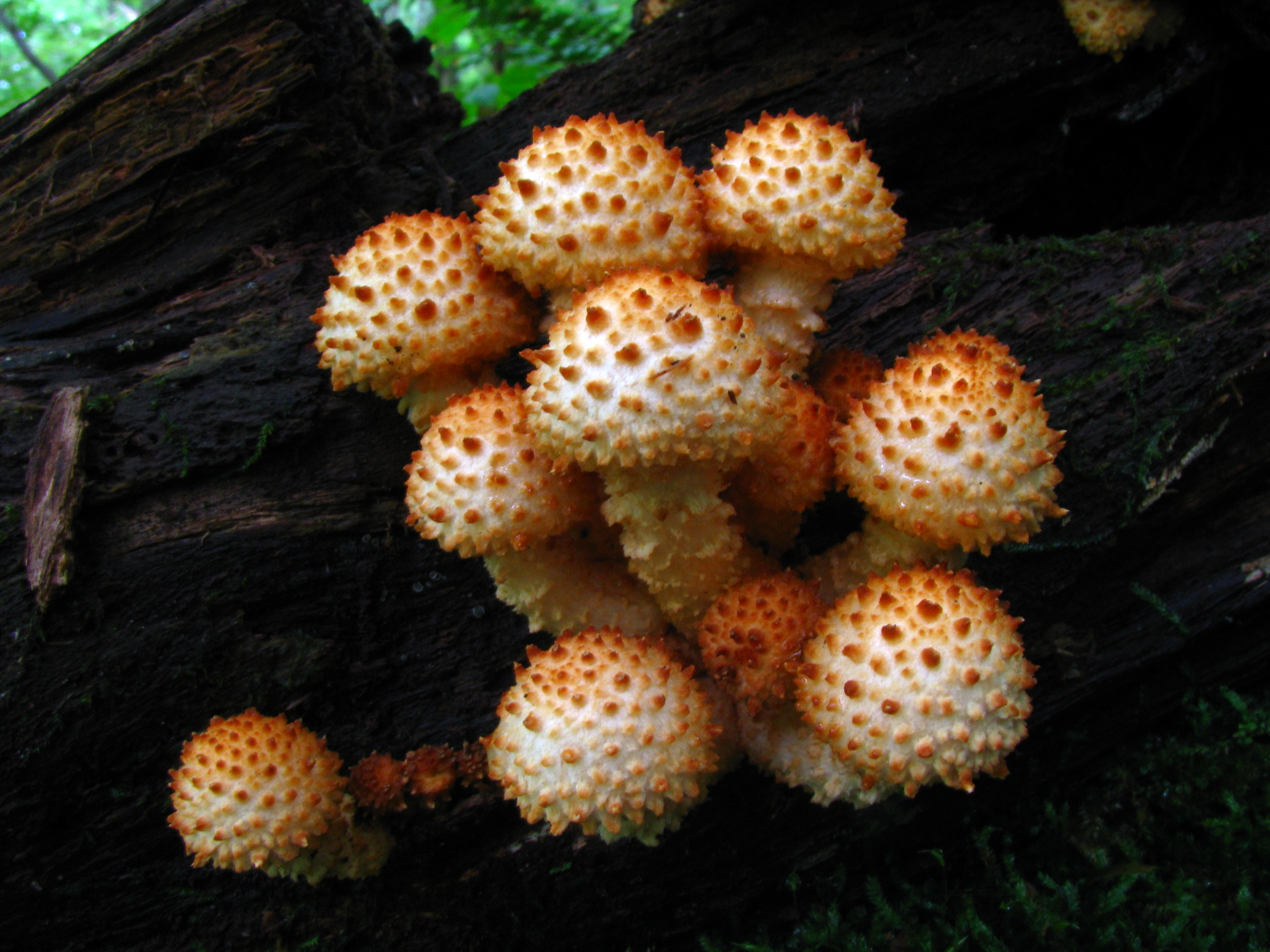
P. squarrosoides

- Pholiota sabulosa Peck 1896
- Pholiota salicina Velen. 1921
- Pholiota sanguineomaculans Höhn. 1914
- Pholiota scabella Zeller 1933 – United States
- Pholiota scamba (Fr.) M.M.Moser 1986 – Czech Republic; Great Britain
- Pholiota scamboides A.H.Sm. & Hesler 1968 – United States
- Pholiota schraderi (Peck) Overh. 1924
- Pholiota scobifera (Berk. & M.A.Curtis) Pat. 1903
- Pholiota semi-imbricata (Singer) Singer 1951
- Pholiota sequoiae A.H.Sm. & Hesler 1968 – United States
- Pholiota serotina A.H.Sm. & Hesler 1968 – United States
- Pholiota sienna (Kauffman) A.H.Sm. & Hesler 1968 – United States
- Pholiota siennaecolor (Petch) Pegler 1986 – Sri Lanka
- Pholiota silvatica (A.H.Sm.) A.H.Sm. & Hesler 1968 – United States
- Pholiota simulans A.H.Sm. & Hesler 1968 – United States
- Pholiota sipei A.H.Sm. & Hesler 1968 – United States
- Pholiota socotrana Henn. 1891
- Pholiota sola A.H.Sm. & Hesler 1968 – United States
- Pholiota sordida Rick 1920
- Pholiota sphaerospora Beeli 1928 – Congo
- Pholiota sphagnicola (Peck) A.H.Sm. & Hesler 1968 – United States
- Pholiota sphagnophila (Peck) A.H.Sm. & Hesler 1968 – United States
- Pholiota spinulifera (Murrill) Singer 1973
- Pholiota spumosa (Fr.) Singer 1951 – Great Britain
- Pholiota squalida (Peck) A.H.Sm. & Hesler 1968 – United States
- Pholiota squarrosa (Vahl) P.Kumm. 1871 – Alberta; Austria; Great Britain; Ireland; Northern Ireland
- Pholiota squarrosipes Cleland 1933 – Australia
- Pholiota squarrosoadiposa J.E.Lange 1940
- Pholiota squarrosoides (Peck) Sacc. 1887 – Czech Republic; Great Britain; Sweden
- Pholiota stratosa A.H.Sm. & Hesler 1968 – United States
- Pholiota stropharioides Rick 1930
- Pholiota subamara A.H.Sm. & Hesler 1968 – United States
- Pholiota subcaerulea A.H.Sm. & Hesler 1968 – United States
- Pholiota subcarbonaria (Murrill) A.H.Sm. & Hesler 1968 – United States
- Pholiota subcastanea A.H.Sm. & Hesler 1968 – United States
- Pholiota subdefossa A.H.Sm. & Hesler 1968 – United States
- Pholiota suberebia (Britzelm.) Sacc. & Traverso 1911
- Pholiota subflammans (Speg.) Sacc. 1891
- Pholiota subflavida (Murrill) A.H.Sm. & Hesler 1968 – United States
- Pholiota subfulva (Peck) A.H.Sm. & Hesler 1968 – United States
- Pholiota subgelatinosa A.H.Sm. & Hesler 1968 – United States
- Pholiota sublubrica A.H.Sm. & Hesler 1968 – United States
- Pholiota subminor A.H.Sm. & Hesler 1968 – United States
- Pholiota submutabilis Henn. 1899
- Pholiota subnigra Murrill 1912
- Pholiota subochracea (A.H.Sm.) A.H.Sm. & Hesler 1968 – United States – Czech Republic
- Pholiota subpapillata A.H.Sm. & Hesler 1968 – United States
- Pholiota subpumila Cleland 1927 – Australia
- Pholiota subsaponacea A.H.Sm. & Hesler 1968 – United States
- Pholiota subtestacea (Murrill) A.H.Sm. & Hesler 1968 – United States
- Pholiota subtogularis Cleland 1933 – Australia
- Pholiota subvelutina A.H.Sm. & Hesler 1968 – United States
- Pholiota subvelutipes A.H.Sm. & Hesler 1968 – United States
- Pholiota sulphurea Velen. 1921
- Pholiota sylva Natarajan & C.Ravindran 2003 – India

== T ==
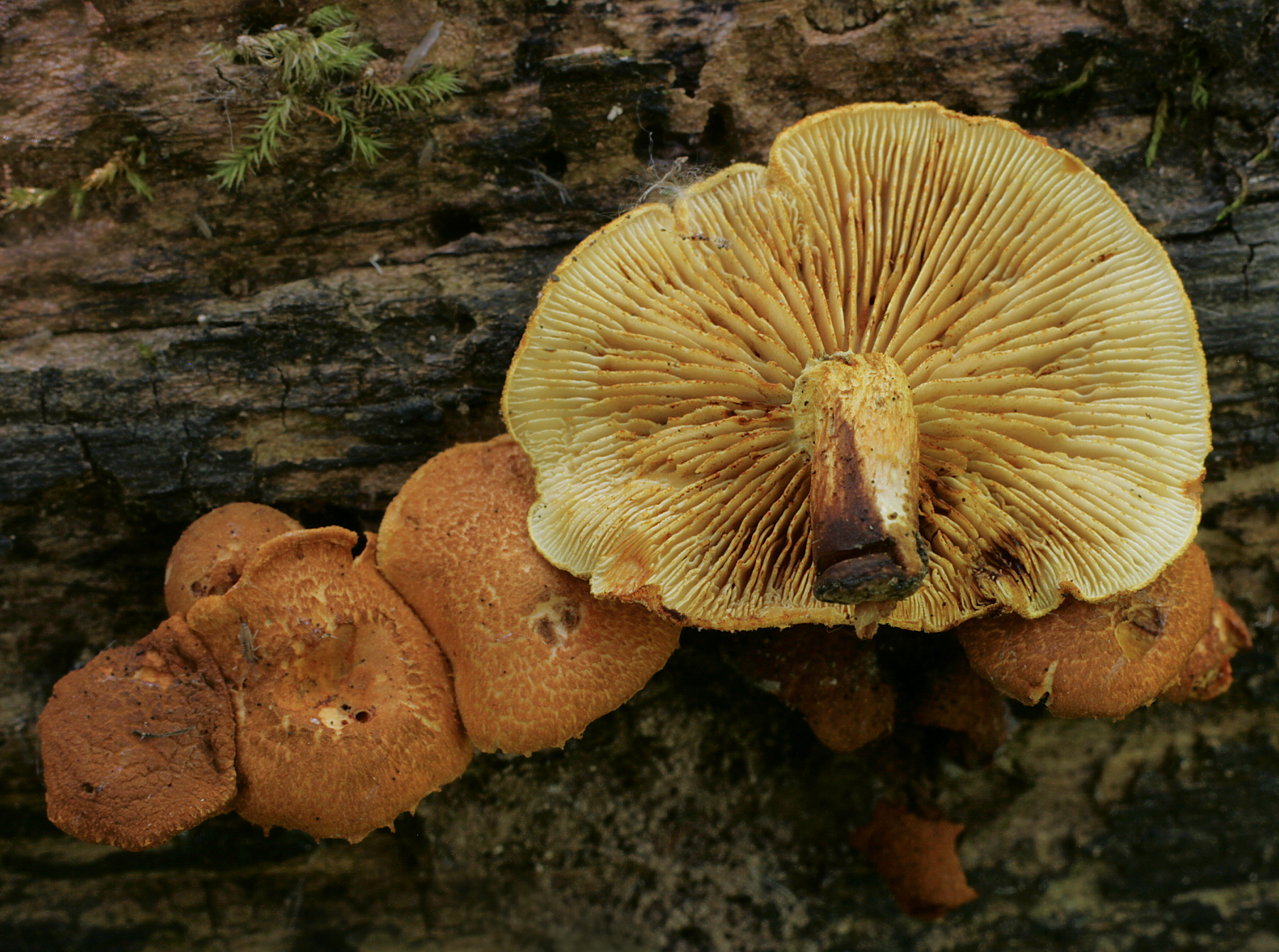
P. tuberculosa

- Pholiota tabacinirugosa S.Ito & S.Imai 1940 – Japan
- Pholiota tahquamenonensis A.H.Sm. & Hesler 1968 – United States
- Pholiota talquensis Garrido 1988
- Pholiota temnophylla (Peck) Sacc. 1887
- Pholiota tennesseensis A.H.Sm. & Hesler 1968 – United States
- Pholiota terrestris Overh. 1924 – California
- Pholiota testacea Rick 1938
- Pholiota tetonensis A.H.Sm. & Hesler 1968 – United States
- Pholiota teucrii Bubák 1914
- Pholiota tilopus (Kalchbr. & MacOwan) D.A.Reid 1975
- Pholiota tottenii (Murrill) A.H.Sm. & Hesler 1968 – United States
- Pholiota trinitensis Dennis 1970 – São Paulo; Trinidad-Tobago
- Pholiota trullisata A.H.Sm. & Hesler 1968 – United States
- Pholiota truncata Natarajan & Raman 1983 – India
- Pholiota tuberculosa (Schaeff.) P.Kumm. 1871 – Czech Republic; Great Britain

== U ==
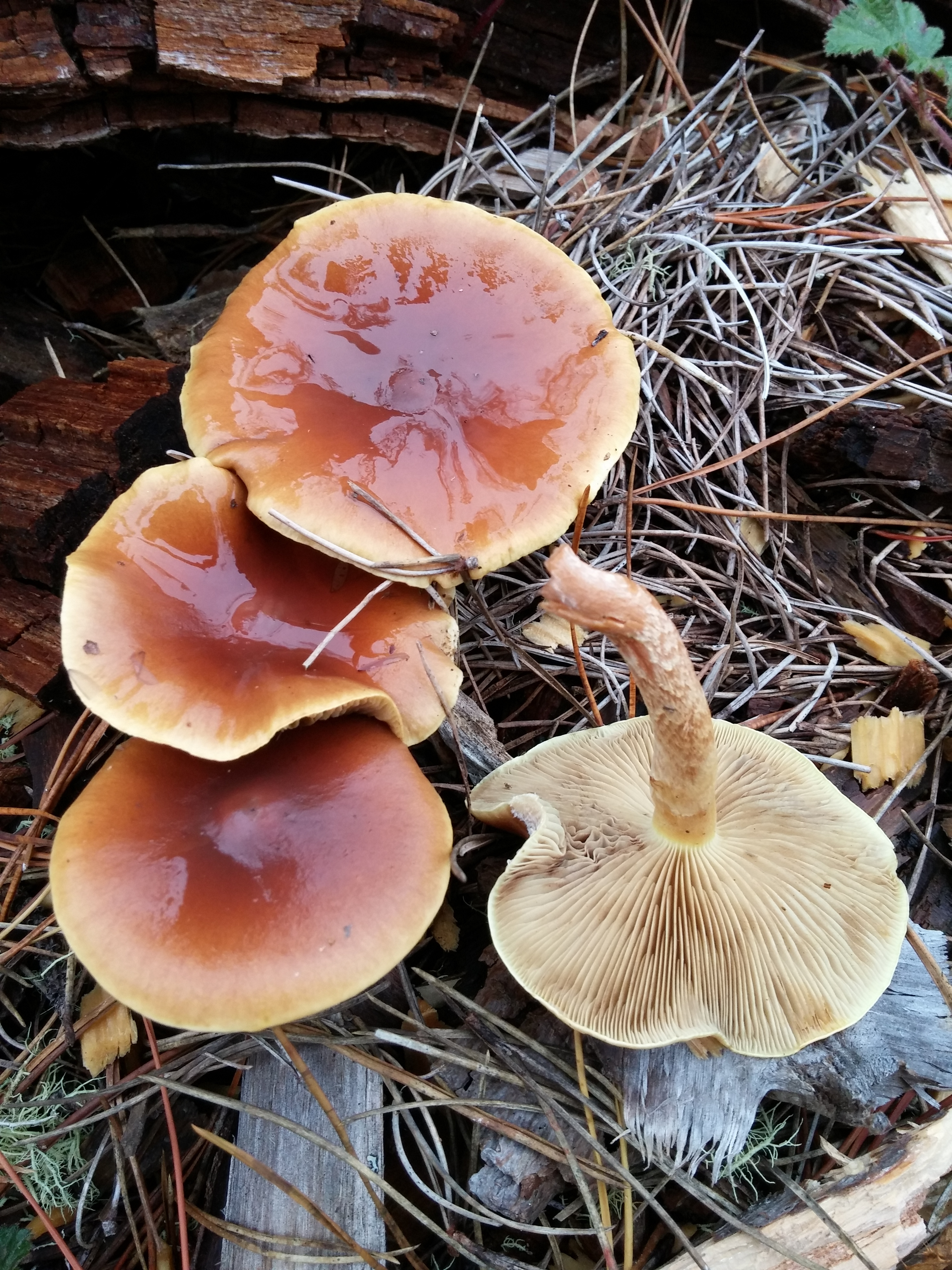
P. velaglutinosa

- Pholiota umbilicata A.H.Sm. & Hesler 1968 – United States
- Pholiota urvilleana Sacc. 1914
- Pholiota usneae Vouaux 1914

== V ==
- Pholiota variabilispora A.H.Sm. & Hesler 1968 – United States
- Pholiota variicystis G.Moreno & E.Valenz. 1994
- Pholiota varzeae Singer 1989
- Pholiota velaglutinosa A.H.Sm. & Hesler 1968 – United States
- Pholiota velata (Peck) A.H.Sm. & Hesler 1968 – United States
- Pholiota veris A.H.Sm. & Hesler 1968 – United States
- Pholiota verna A.H.Sm. & Hesler 1968 – United States
- Pholiota verrucosa Henn. 1900 – Africa
- Pholiota vialis (Murrill) A.H.Sm. & Hesler 1968 – United States
- Pholiota vinaceobrunnea A.H.Sm. & Hesler 1968 – United States
- Pholiota virescens E.J.Tian & T.Bau 2012
- Pholiota virescentifolia A.H.Sm. & Hesler 1968 – United States
- Pholiota virgata A.H.Sm. & Hesler 1968 – United States
