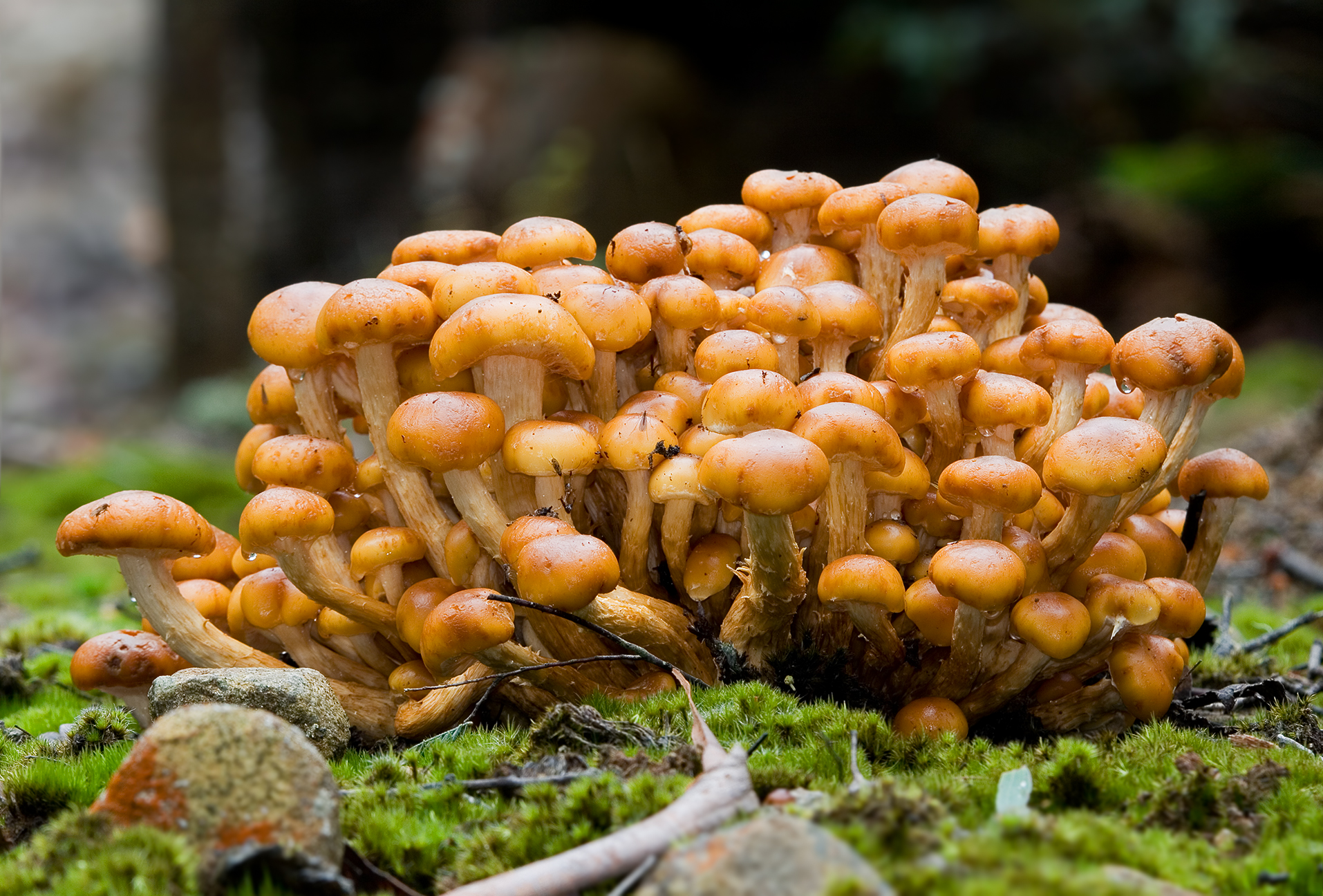

Scientific classification
- Kingdom: Fungi
- Division: Basidiomycota
- Class: Agaricomycetes
- Order: Agaricales
- Family: Strophariaceae
- Genus: Pholiota
- Species: P. malicola

Binomial name
- Pholiota malicola (Kauffman) A.H.Sm. (1934)

Synonyms
- Flammula malicola Kauffman (1926)

= Pholiota malicola =

Species of fungus

Pholiota malicola, commonly known as the forgettable pholiota, is an inedible species of fungus.

The species is in the family Strophariaceae. Originally called Flammula malicola by mycologist Calvin Henry Kauffman in 1926, it was transferred to the genus Pholiota by Alexander H. Smith in 1934.

It is an orangish species with a smooth cap 3–9 centimetres (1 1/4–3 1/2 in) in width. The stalk is 4–15 cm (1 1/2–6 in) long.

It is found in North America and Australia. It grows in groups on decaying wood.

== See also ==
- List of Pholiota species
