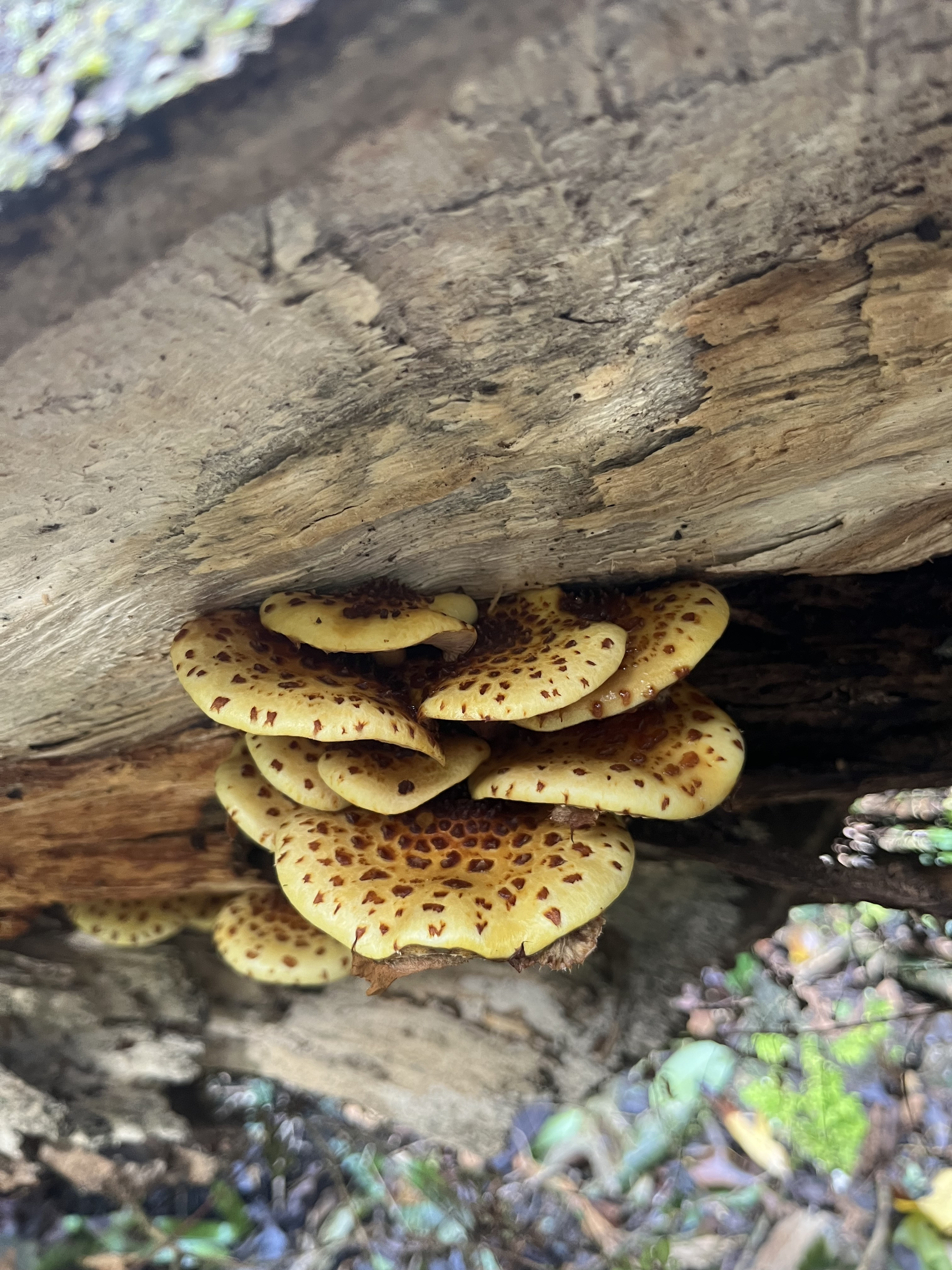

Scientific classification
- Kingdom: Fungi
- Division: Basidiomycota
- Class: Agaricomycetes
- Order: Agaricales
- Family: Strophariaceae
- Genus: Pholiota
- Species: P. glutinosa

Binomial name
- Pholiota glutinosa (Massee) E. Horak (1971)

= Pholiota glutinosa =

New Zealand fungi species

Pholiota glutinosa is a species of poisonous fungi in the genus Pholiota, endemic to New Zealand.

== Taxonomy ==
First discovered by George Edward Massee in 1989 where it was originally named Hypholoma glutinosum. It has also been named P. adiposa and P. aurivellaas.

== Description ==
This species produces its fruit body from autumn to early winter. The pileus is convex and obtuse, ranging from 40–60 mm in diameter and 60–80 mm in height. The pileus is yellow with concentrically arranged evanescent darker squarrose scales 5–12 mm across. The pileus is shiny in dry weather due to the dried gluten layer on its surface. In wet conditions, the scales dissolve into the surface gluten. The flesh is white. Gills adnate and range from 6–8 mm long. The spores are rusty orange, elliptical in shape with an area of 7 × 3 μm. The stem is 7–12 cm long and can be up to 2 cm thick.

Pholiota glutinosa is poisonous.

== Habitat and distribution ==
Pholiota glutinosa is found on decaying wood and trees. Distribution is all over New Zealand, also found in Europe and the United States.

== Etymology ==
glutinosa: From the Greek gloeo 'glue', refers to the shiny pileus due to gluten present on its surface, giving it a shiny appearance.

== See also ==
- List of Pholiota species
