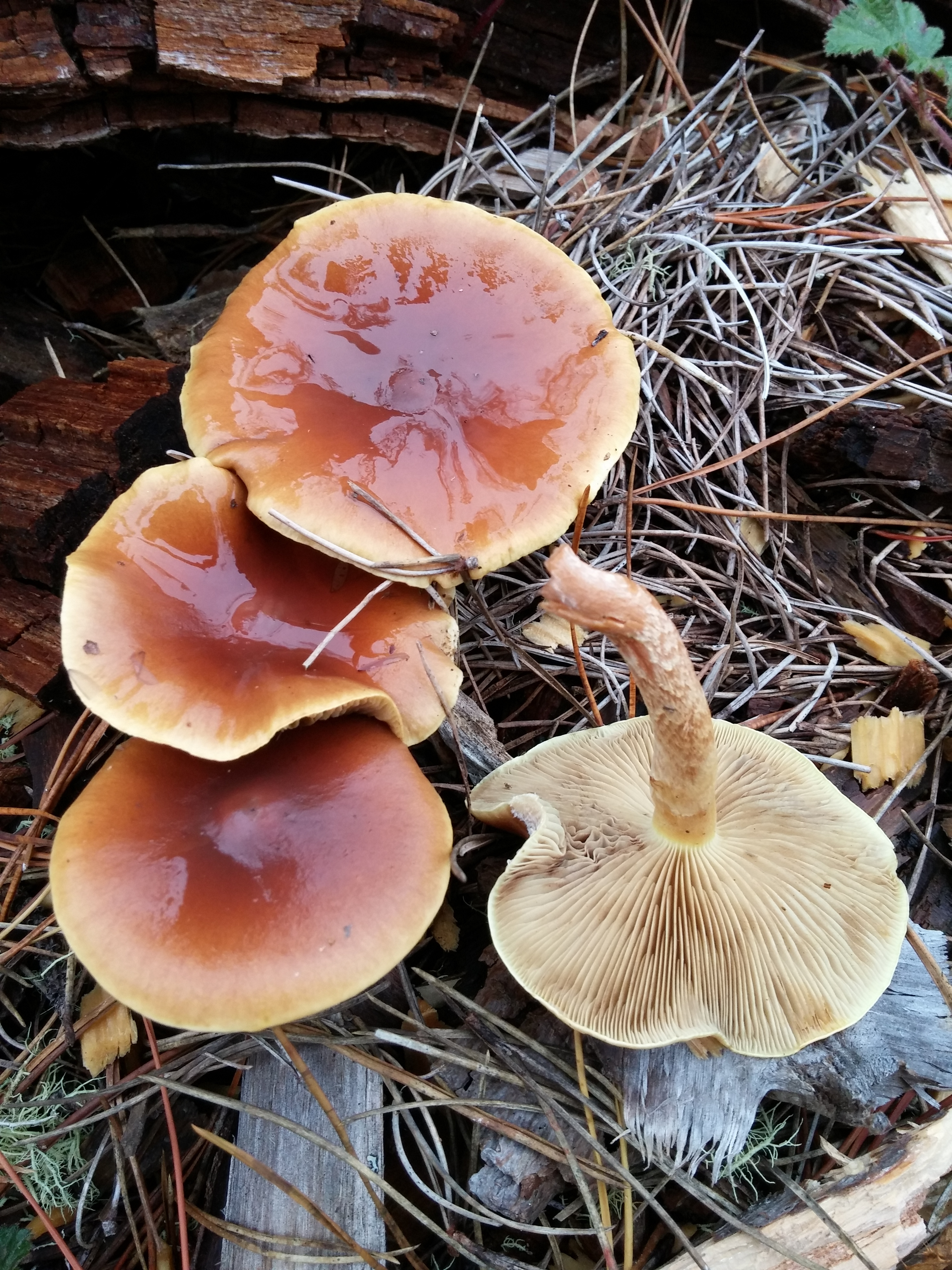

Scientific classification
- Domain: Eukaryota
- Kingdom: Fungi
- Division: Basidiomycota
- Class: Agaricomycetes
- Order: Agaricales
- Family: Strophariaceae
- Genus: Pholiota
- Species: P. velaglutinosa

Binomial name
- Pholiota velaglutinosa A.H.Sm. & Hesler (1968)

= Pholiota velaglutinosa =

Species of fungus

Pholiota velaglutinosa is a species of agaric fungus in the family Strophariaceae. Found in the western United States, it was described as new to science in 1968 by American mycologists Alexander H. Smith and Lexemuel Ray Hesler.

== Description ==
When young, the fruit bodies have a slimy veil. The sticky reddish caps measure 3–6 cm (1 1/4–2 1/4 in) in diameter. The tannish gills are close. The stipe is up to 7 cm (2 3/4 in) long and bears a gelatinous ring. The spore print is brown.

=== Similar species ===
It resembles several species of Pholiota that lack the slimy young veil.

== See also ==
- List of Pholiota species
