= Pholiota aurantioalbida =

Scientific classification
- Domain: Eukaryota
- Kingdom: Fungi
- Division: Basidiomycota
- Class: Agaricomycetes
- Order: Agaricales
- Family: Strophariaceae
- Genus: Pholiota
- Species: P. aurantioalbida

Binomial name
- Pholiota aurantioalbida Singer (1969)

Species of fungus

Pholiota aurantioalbida is a species of agaric fungus in the family Strophariaceae. Found in Argentina, it was described as new to science by mycologist Rolf Singer in 1969.

== See also ==
- List of Pholiota species
