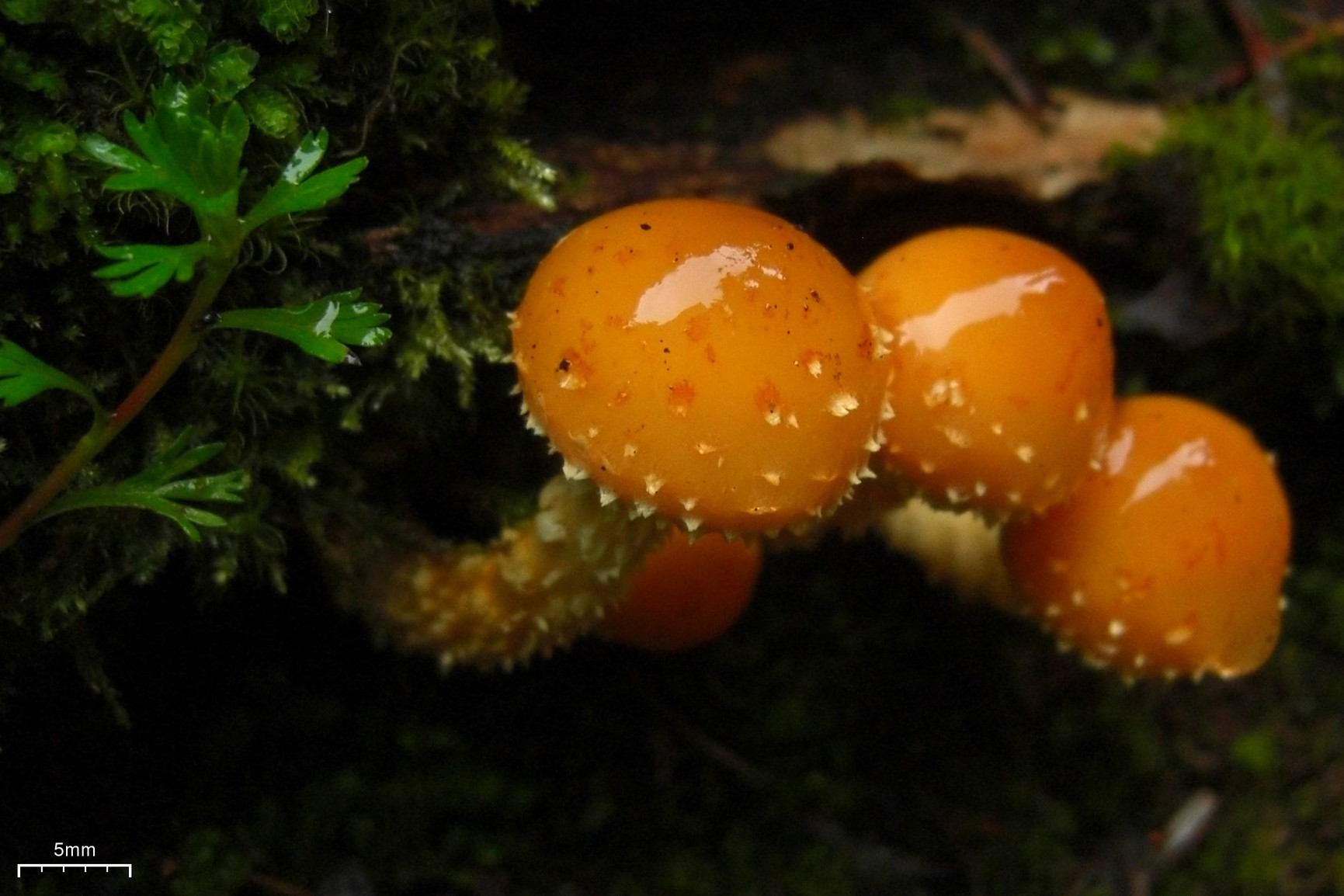

Scientific classification
- Kingdom: Fungi
- Division: Basidiomycota
- Class: Agaricomycetes
- Order: Agaricales
- Family: Strophariaceae
- Genus: Pholiota
- Species: P. limonella

Binomial name
- Pholiota limonella (Peck) Sacc. (1887)

Synonyms
- Agaricus limonellus Peck (1878); Pholiota ceriferoides P.D.Orton (1988); Pholiota subsquarrosa var. limonella (Peck) Rick (1938)

= Pholiota limonella =

Species of fungus

Pholiota limonella is a mushroom of the genus Pholiota. It is commonly found on fallen beech trunks and other hardwoods. It shares the same macroscopic features as P. adiposa and P. aurivella and can only be reliably distinguished from them based on spore size.

Its subspecies include P. abietis, P. connata, and P. subvelutipes. This mushroom is categorized as "not edible", but said to "taste mild" in Phillips (2010). However there was a project in the Hubei province of China trying to "tame" the mushroom for growing massively for food.

== See also ==
- List of Pholiota species
