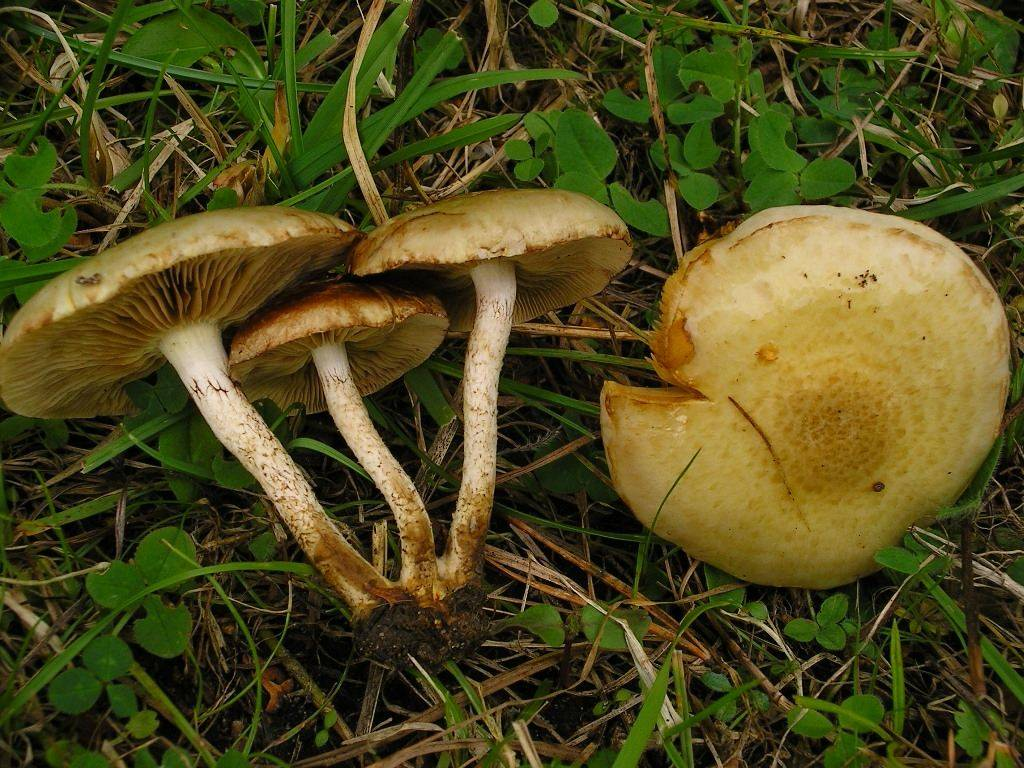

Scientific classification
- Kingdom: Fungi
- Division: Basidiomycota
- Class: Agaricomycetes
- Order: Agaricales
- Family: Strophariaceae
- Genus: Pholiota
- Species: P. gummosa

Binomial name
- Pholiota gummosa (Lasch) Singer (1951)

Synonyms
- Agaricus gummosus Lasch (1828); Flammula gummosa (Lasch) P.Kumm. (1871); Dryophila gummosa (Lasch) Quél. (1886); Visculus gummosus (Lasch) Earle (1909); Gymnopilus gummosus (Lasch) Maire (1933); Pholiotina gummosa (Lasch) Singer (1951)

= Pholiota gummosa =

Species of fungus

Pholiota gummosa, commonly known as the sticky scalycap, is a common species of mushroom-forming fungus in the family Strophariaceae. It is found in Europe and North America, where it grows as a saprotroph on the rotting wood of deciduous trees, including trunks and roots. It can also grow on wood buried near the surface, making it seem as if it is fruiting in grass.

== Taxonomy ==
The fungus was originally described by Wilhelm Gottfried Lasch in 1828, as a member of the genus Agaricus. After being shuffled to several different genera in its taxonomic history, it was transferred to Pholiota by Rolf Singer in 1951.

== Description ==
The fungus makes fruitbodies with straw-yellow to beige caps measuring 2–6 cm (0.8–2.4 in) in diameter. The crowded gills on the cap underside have an adnate attachment to the stipe. Initially pale yellow, they turn brownish in age as the spores mature. The mushroom makes a brown spore print. Spores are smooth, thin-walled, somewhat bean-shaped (subphaseoliform), and measure 6–8 by 3.5–4.5 μm.

== See also ==
- List of Pholiota species
