= Pholiota variicystis =

Scientific classification
- Kingdom: Fungi
- Division: Basidiomycota
- Class: Agaricomycetes
- Order: Agaricales
- Family: Strophariaceae
- Genus: Pholiota
- Species: P. variicystis

Binomial name
- Pholiota variicystis G.Moreno & E.Valenz. (1994)

Species of fungus

Pholiota variicystis is a species of fungus in the family Strophariaceae. It is a plant pathogen that infects apricots.

== See also ==
- List of Pholiota species
