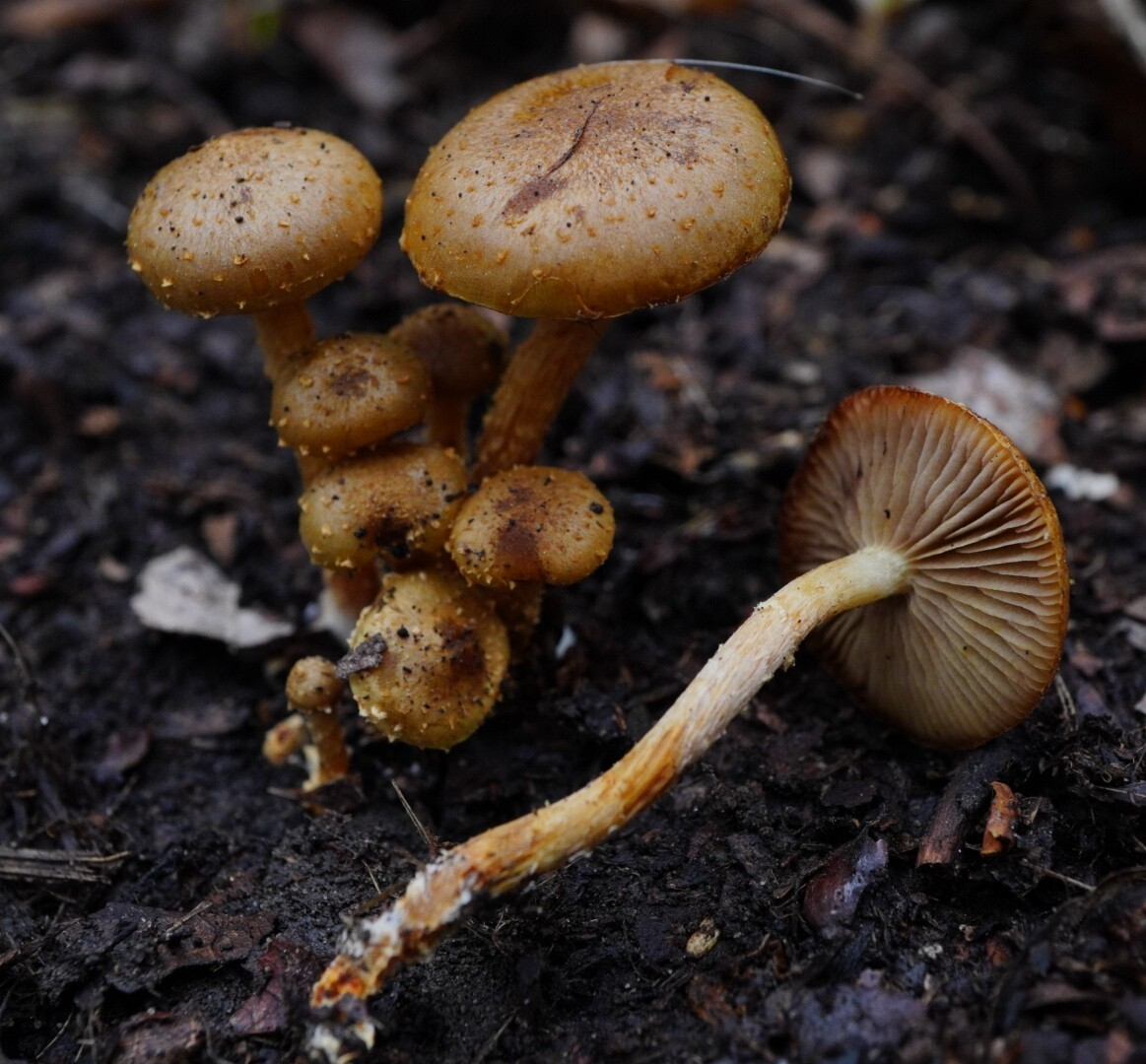
- Pholiota subflammans growing on soil

Scientific classification
- Kingdom: Fungi
- Division: Basidiomycota
- Class: Agaricomycetes
- Order: Agaricales
- Family: Strophariaceae
- Genus: Pholiota
- Species: P. subflammans

Binomial name
- Pholiota subflammans Speg. (1891)

= Pholiota subflammans =

Species of fungus

Pholiota subflammans
- Mycological characteristics
- Gills on hymenium
- Cap is convex or umbonate
- Hymenium is adnate or adnexed
- Stipe has a ring
- Spore print is brown
- Ecology is saprotrophic
- Edibility is inedible

Pholiota subflammans is a species of mushroom of the family Strophariaceae. It was first described by the Italian mycologist Carlo Luigi Spegazzini in 1887. A saprotroph, P. subflammans can be found on decaying wood or on mossy and grassy soil. It is present in Argentina, Chile, New Zealand, and Papua New Guinea. P. subflammans fruit bodies have a rough and scaly appearance, and the stipes have black rings. The mushroom is inedible.

== Taxonomy ==
Pholiota subflammans was first described in 1887 by the Italian mycologist Carlo Luigi Spegazzini who examined the type material from specimens collected in Tierra del Fuego in South America. Austrian mycologist Egon Horak recollected this species in 1950 in the same location where Spegazzini collected it. Another species was described by Rolf Singer in 1952 and 1953 as P. baeosperma. Horak merged the species into P. subflammans in 1967, as such, P. baeosperma is recognised as a synonym of P. subflammans.

== Description ==
The fruit bodies (basidiocarps) of P. subflammans are 25–32 mm in diameter. They are convex, sometimes umonate, brown, with slightly incurved margins. The gills (lamellae) are greyish, dirty white to brownish in colour, adnate to adnexed, and crowded. The stipes are 60 × 8 mm long, yellowish-brown, thinner toward the apex, fibrous, with a blackish ring left by the veil. They are described as squarrose, meaning rough and scaly. The spores are 5.5–6.5 × 3.8–4.5 µm long, smooth, and with a germ pore. The spore print is brown. The cystidia are 20–30 × 6–8 µm long. The mushroom's edibility is classified as inedible, and the taste has been described as metallic by Lazo (2001).

== Distribution and habitat ==
Pholiota subflammans is present in Argentina, Chile, New Zealand, and Papua New Guinea. As a saprotroph, P. subflammans decays dead organic material. Pholiota species are primarily found on decayed wood and are important wood decomposers. P. subflammans has been recorded growing on grassy and mossy soil, and on decayed wood.

== Works cited ==
Books

- Lazo, Waldo (2001). Hongos de Chile Atlas micológico (in Spanish) (2 ed.). Universidad de Chile Facultad de Ciencias.
- Spegazzini, Cárlos (1887). Fungi Fuegiani (in Latin). Buenos Aires: P.E. Coni. doi:10.5962/bhl.title.4055.

Journals

- Horak, E. (1967). "Fungi Austroamericani, IV: Revisión de los hongos superiores de Tierra del Fuego o Patagonia en el Herbario de C. Spegazzini en La Plata". Darwiniana (in Spanish). 14 (2/3). Instituto de Botánica Darwinion: 355–385. ISSN 0011-6793. JSTOR 23213853.
- Horak, E (1983). "Mycogeography in the South Pacific Region: Agaricales, Boletales". Australian Journal of Botany Supplementary Series. 13 (10): 1–42. doi:10.1071/BT8310001. ISSN 0365-3587.
- Niveiro, Nicolás; Popoff, Orlando Fabián; Lechner, Bernardo E.; Albertó, Edgardo Omar (2014). "Pholiota oblita, new species in sect. Adiposae stirps Subflammans (Strophariaceae, Agaricomycetes), from the Argentinean Yungas". Phytotaxa. Magnolia Press. doi:10.1071/BT8310001. ISSN 1179-3155.
- Singer, Rolf (1952). "Type Studies On Agarics III". Lilloa. 2.
- Singer, Rolf; Digilio, Antonio P. (1953). "Pródromo de la flora agaricina argentina". Lilloa (in Spanish): 5–461. ISSN 2346-9641.
- Tamang, Juna; Thapa, Alisha; Acharya, Krishnendu (2023). "New record of Pholiota multicingulata (Strophariaceae) from India based on morphological data and phylogenetic analyses". Studies in Fungi. 8 (1): 1–5. doi:10.48130/SIF-2023-0004. ISSN 2465-4973.
