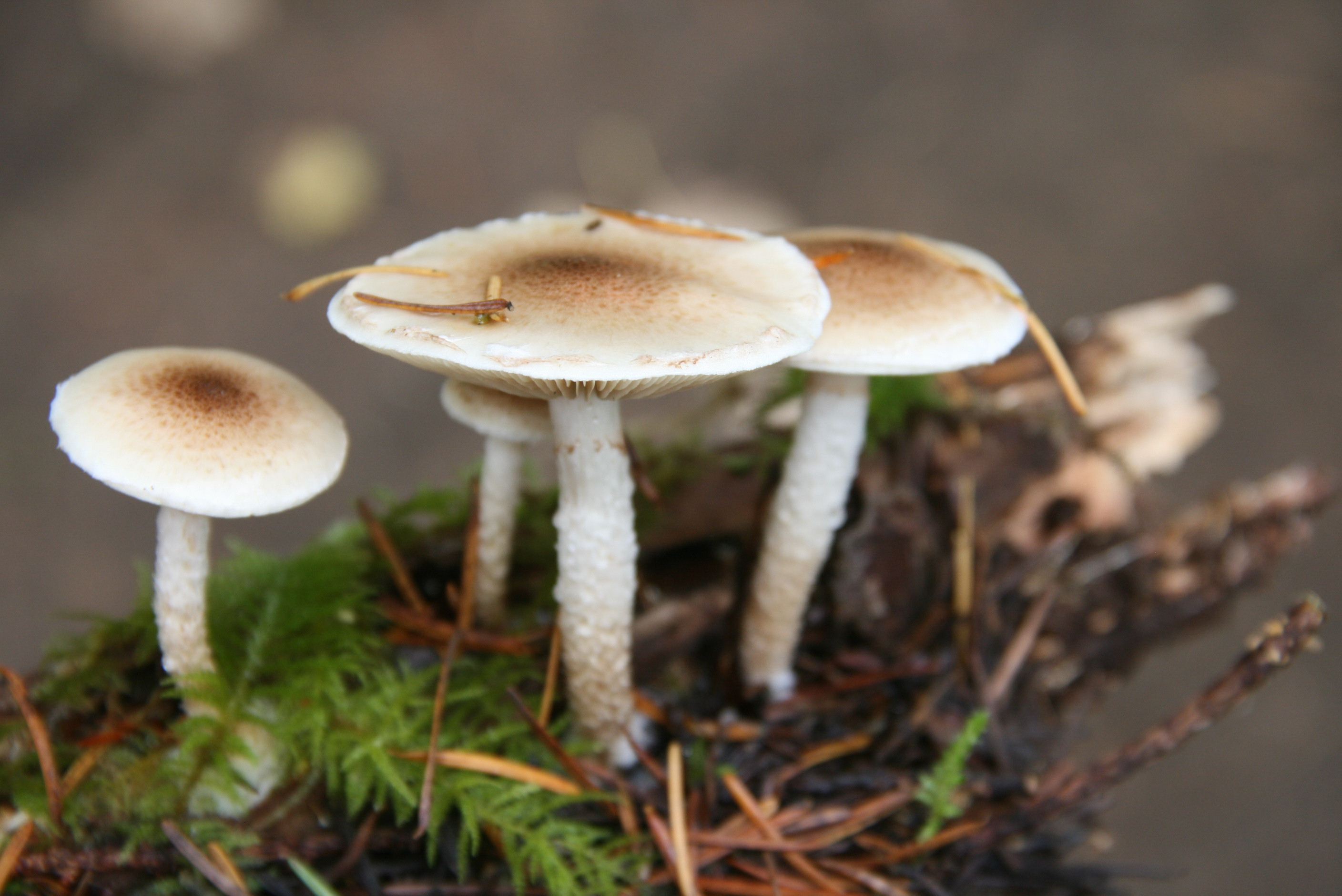

Scientific classification
- Kingdom: Fungi
- Division: Basidiomycota
- Class: Agaricomycetes
- Order: Agaricales
- Family: Strophariaceae
- Genus: Pholiota
- Species: P. decorata

Binomial name
- Pholiota decorata (Murrill) A.H. Sm. & Hesler

= Pholiota decorata =

Pholiota decorata Mycological characteristics
- Gills on hymenium
- Cap is convex or flat
- Hymenium is adnate or sinuate
- Stipe is bare or has a ring
- Spore print is brown
- Edibility is unknown

Pholiota decorata is a species of mushroom in the family Strophariaceae.

== Description ==
The cap of Pholiota decorata is about 2-8 centimeters in diameter. It is convex, sometimes flattening in age. It is cream-colored with a brown center. The stipe is between 3 and 9 centimeters long and 0.3-1 centimeters wide. When the mushroom is young, a veil covers the gills. When the mushroom matures, the veil leaves tissue on the stipe. The gills vary from sinuate to adnate. They start out white or yellowish, before becoming hazel and eventually the color of clay. The spore print is brown.

== Habitat and ecology ==
Pholiota decorata grows from duff and wood. It is commonly found in conifer forests in the Pacific Northwest.
