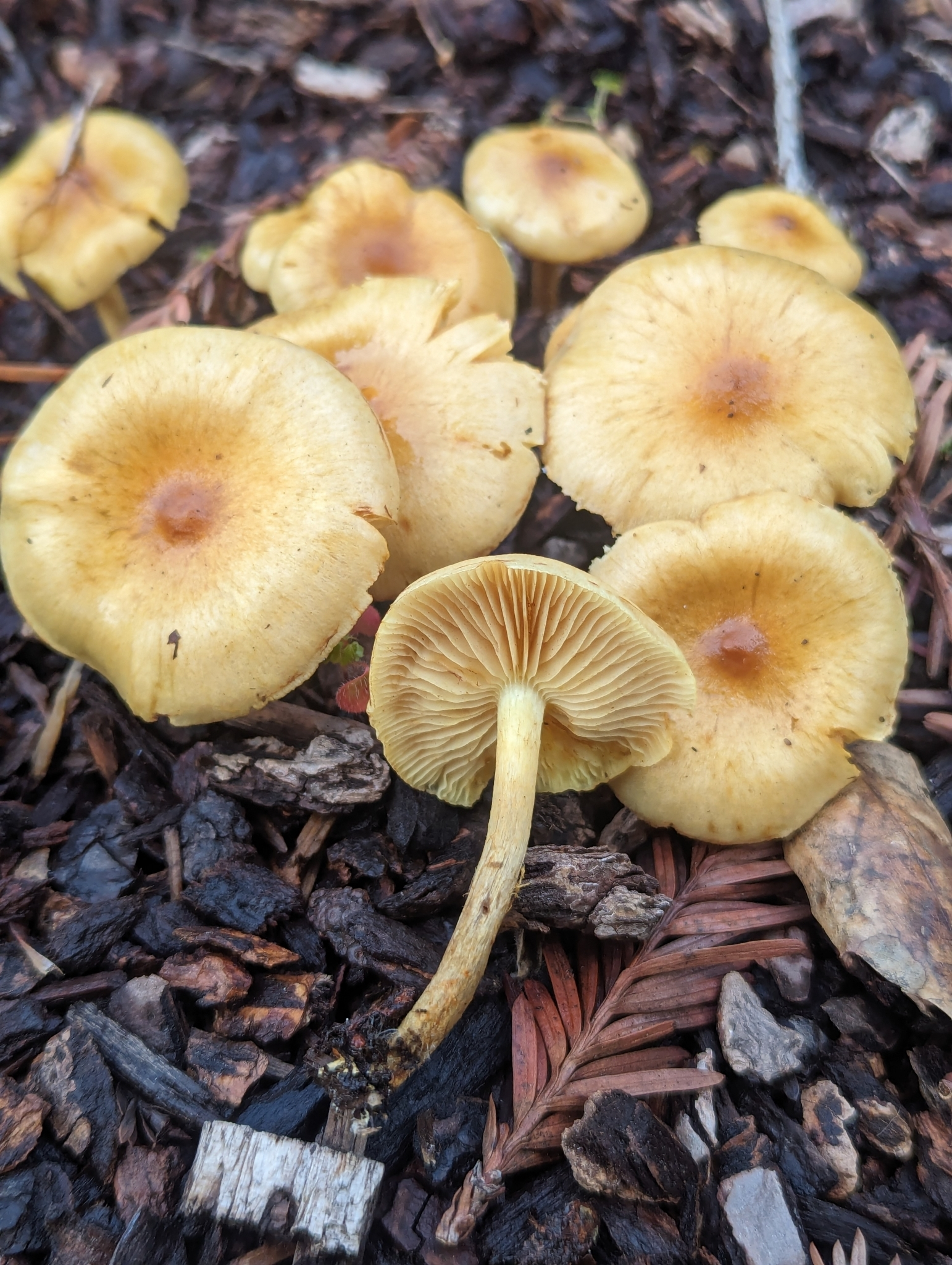

Scientific classification
- Kingdom: Fungi
- Division: Basidiomycota
- Class: Agaricomycetes
- Order: Agaricales
- Family: Strophariaceae
- Genus: Pholiota
- Species: P. spumosa

Binomial name
- Pholiota spumosa (Fr.) Singer

= Pholiota spumosa =

Pholiota spumosa Mycological characteristics
- Gills on hymenium
- Cap is conical or flat
- Hymenium is adnate or adnexed
- Stipe is bare
- Spore print is brown
- Edibility is unknown

Pholiota spumosa, commonly known as the slender pholiota, is a species of mushroom in the family Strophariaceae. It grows on decaying wood.

== Description ==
The cap of Pholiota spumosa is about 2-6 centimeters in diameter. It starts out conical to convex, before becoming flat or umbonate. It is brownish in color, with a yellowish margin. The stipe is about 3-6 centimeters long and 0.3-0.5 centimeters in diameter. The partial veil is very thin, and leaves thin fibers on the stipe. The gills can be adnexed or adnate, and are initially yellow in color. They become browner in age.

== Habitat and ecology ==
Pholiota spumosa is commonly found on rotten logs and stumps, as well as woodchips. It also grows under conifers. It can grow in small clusters or troops. It is common in the Pacific Northwest.
