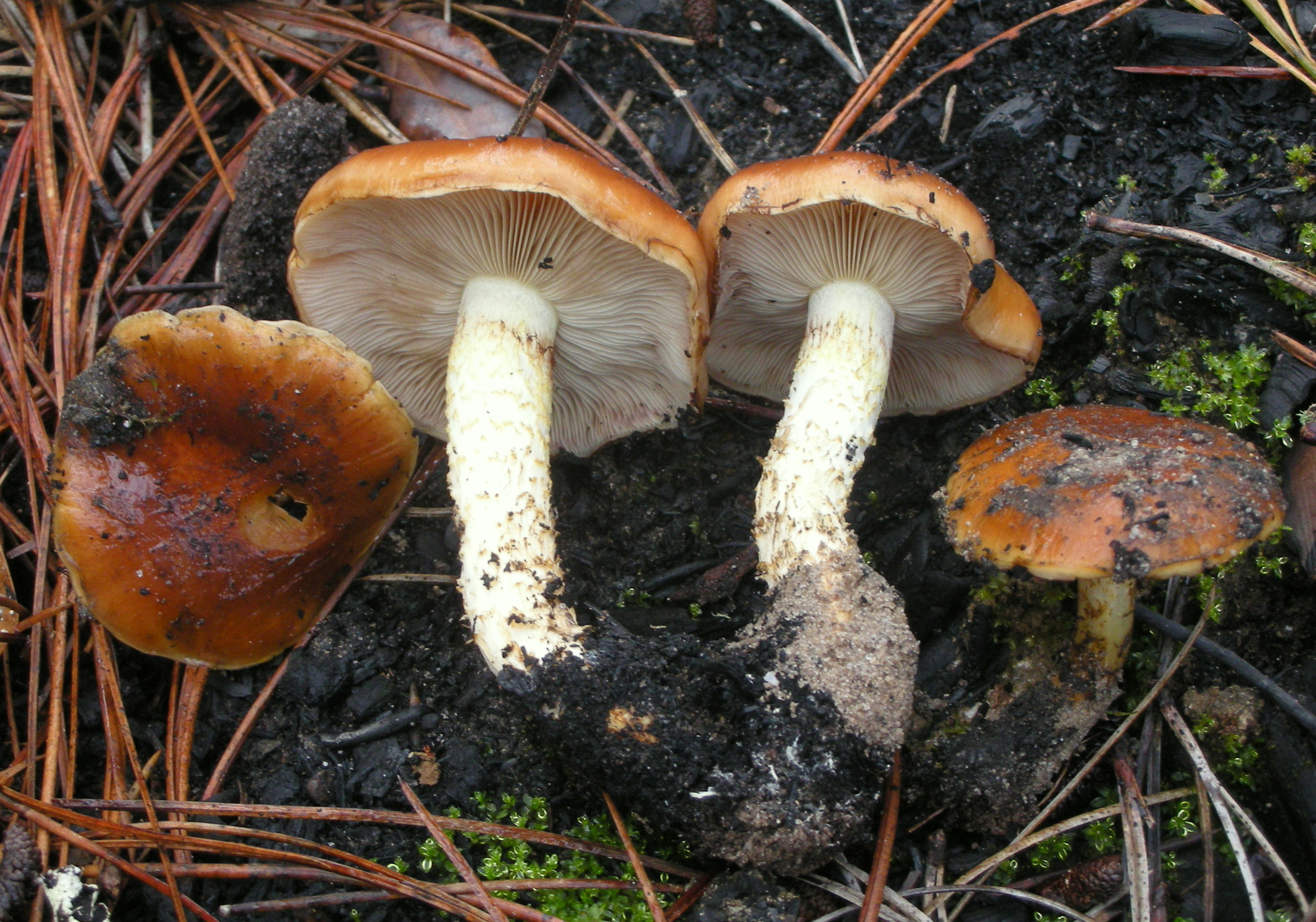

Scientific classification
- Kingdom: Fungi
- Division: Basidiomycota
- Class: Agaricomycetes
- Order: Agaricales
- Family: Strophariaceae
- Genus: Pholiota
- Species: P. brunnescens

Binomial name
- Pholiota brunnescens A.H. Sm. & Hesler

= Pholiota brunnescens =

Pholiota brunnescens Mycological characteristics
- Gills on hymenium
- Cap is convex or flat
- Hymenium is adnate or sinuate
- Stipe is bare or has a ring
- Spore print is brown
- Ecology is saprotrophic
- Edibility is unknown

Pholiota brunnescens, commonly known as the charcoal pholiota, is a species of mushroom in the family Strophariaceae. It is pyrophilous, meaning that it grows in burned areas after fires.

== Description ==
The cap of Pholiota brunnescens is convex or plane and about 2-7 centimeters in diameter. It is brown, sometimes becoming orange with age. The surface of the cap is slimy. The stipe is about 2-7 millimeters long and 0.5-1 millimeters wide. It starts out pale yellowish, before becoming darker as the mushroom matures. The stipe bruises brown and sometimes has an annulus. The gills can be adnate or sinuate, and start out pale, before becoming brown. The spore print is brown.

== Habitat and ecology ==
Pholiota brunnescens grows in burned areas. It is common in firepits, burn piles, and after forest fires. It can grow out of soil or wood, as long as it is burnt.
