= Pholiota avellaneifolia =

Scientific classification
- Kingdom: Fungi
- Division: Basidiomycota
- Class: Agaricomycetes
- Order: Agaricales
- Family: Strophariaceae
- Genus: Pholiota
- Species: P. avellaneifolia

Binomial name
- Pholiota avellaneifolia A.H. Sm. & Hesler

Pholiota avellaneifolia
- Mycological characteristics
- Gills on hymenium
- Cap is convex or flat
- Hymenium is adnate or decurrent
- Stipe is bare or has a ring
- Spore print is brown
- Edibility is unknown

Pholiota avellaneifolia is a species of mushroom in the family Strophariaceae.

== Description ==
The cap of Pholiota avellaneifolia is about 2-8 centimeters in diameter. It starts out convex but sometimes becomes flat. It is brownish in color and fibrillose. The stipe is about 3-8 centimeters long and 0.5-1.5 centimeters wide. A membranous partial veil covers the gills when the mushroom is young. The gills can be adnate or decurrent, and they start out hazel before becoming rustier in age. The spore print is brown.

== Habitat and ecology ==
Pholiota avellaneifolia is found under conifers, especially at high elevations. It is known to grow under spruce.
