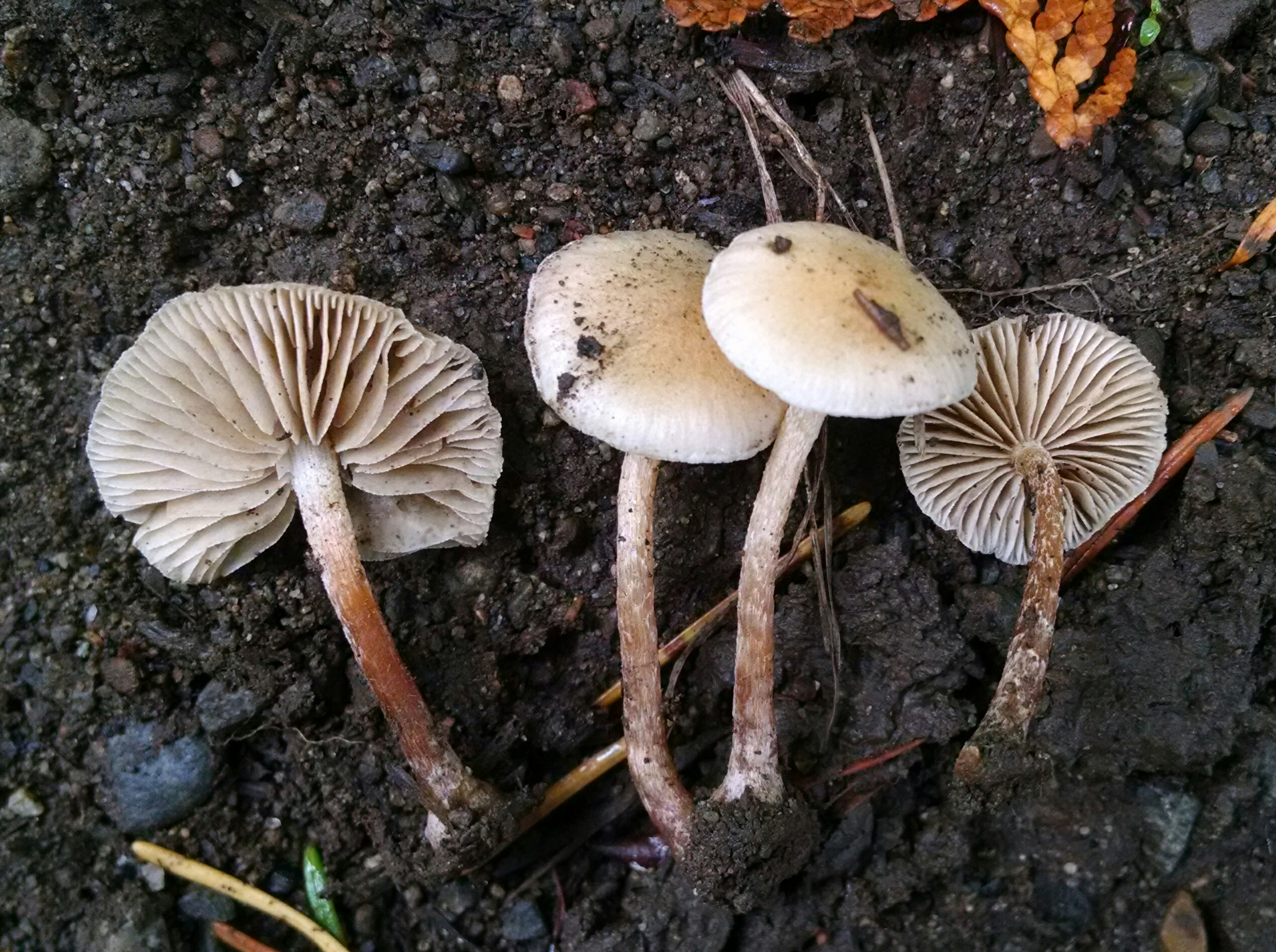

Scientific classification
- Kingdom: Fungi
- Division: Basidiomycota
- Class: Agaricomycetes
- Order: Agaricales
- Family: Strophariaceae
- Genus: Pholiota
- Species: P. scamba

Binomial name
- Pholiota scamba (Fr.) M.M. Moser

= Pholiota scamba =

Pholiota scamba Mycological characteristics
- Gills on hymenium
- Cap is convex or flat
- Hymenium is adnate
- Stipe is bare
- Spore print is brown
- Edibility is unknown

Pholiota scamba is a species of mushroom in the family Strophariaceae. It is found in the Pacific Northwest.

== Description ==
The cap of Pholiota scamba is about 1–3 centimeters in diameter and can be convex, flat, or sometimes umbonate. It starts out whitish or beige, darkening in age. The stipe is about 1.5–3 centimeters long and 1–3 millimeters wide. The gills are adnate or sometimes slightly sinuate or decurrent, and the spore print is brown.

== Habitat and ecology ==
Pholiota scamba grows on conifer bark and wood debris. It fruits during summer and fall.
