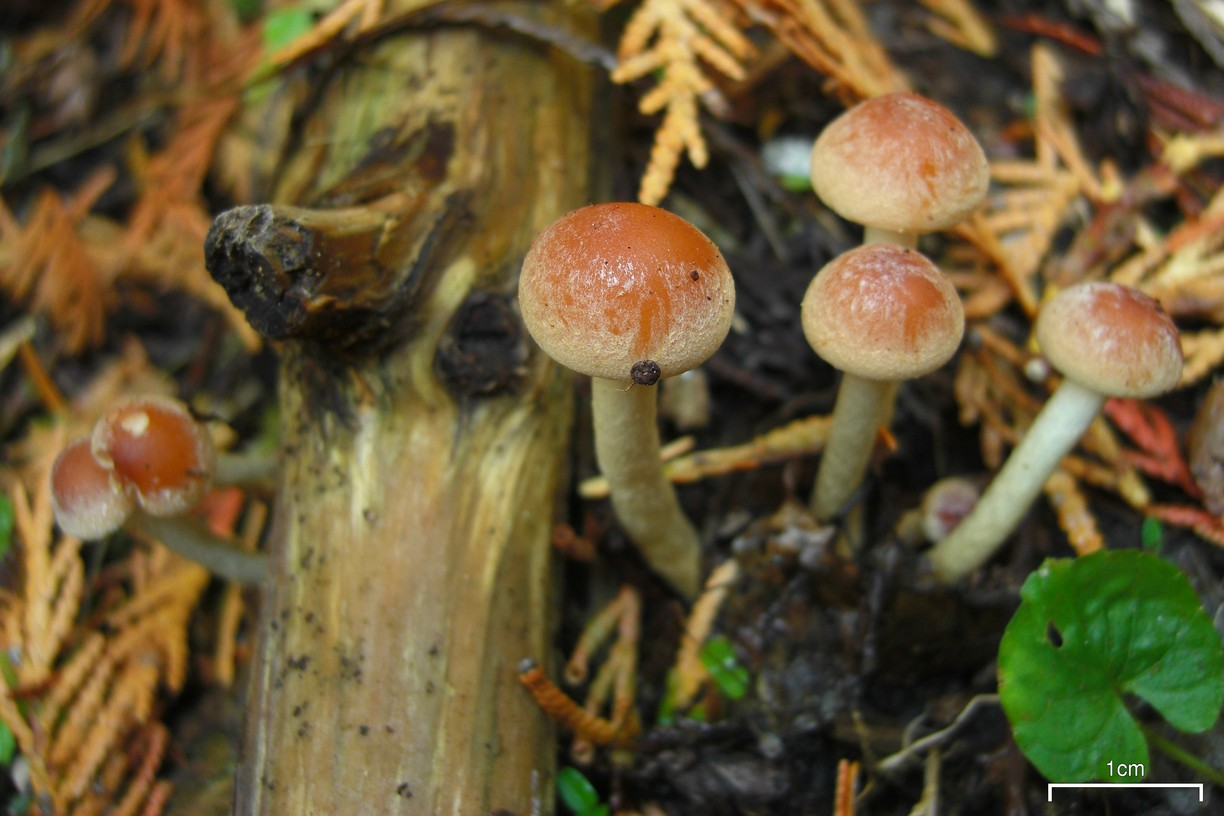

Scientific classification
- Kingdom: Fungi
- Division: Basidiomycota
- Class: Agaricomycetes
- Order: Agaricales
- Family: Strophariaceae
- Genus: Pyrrhulomyces
- Species: P. astragalinus

Binomial name
- Pyrrhulomyces astragalinus (Fr.) E.J.Tian & Matheny (2020)

Synonyms
- List: Agaricus astragalinus Fr. (1821); Flammula astragalina (Fr.) P.Kumm. (1871); Dryophila astragalina (Fr.) Quél. (1886); Flammopsis astragalinus (Fr.) Fayod (1889); Naucoria astragalina (Fr.) Quél. (1889); Flammula astragalina var. perelegans P.Karst. (1905); Gymnopilus astragalinus (Fr.) S.Imai (1938); Pholiota astragalina (Fr.) Singer (1951); Pholiotina astragalina (Fr.) Singer (1951)

= Pyrrhulomyces astragalinus =

Species of mushroom-forming fungus

Pyrrhulomyces astragalinus, commonly known as the pinkish-orange pholiota, is a species of fungus in the family Strophariaceae, originally described by Elias Fries in 1821 as Agaricus astragalinus. After being moved to Pholiota, the species was reassigned to the newly established genus Pyrrhulomyces in 2020 based on molecular phylogenetics evidence showing it belongs to a distinct lineage.

The species is characterized by its pink-orange cap and stem that blacken when bruised, smooth spores lacking a germ pore, and bitter taste. Found throughout temperate regions of the Northern Hemisphere, this saprotroph grows on decaying conifer wood and though non-poisonous, is considered inedible.

== Taxonomy ==
Elias Fries's original Agaricus astragalinus was moved to Pholiota by Rolf Singer before molecular phylogenetics analyses revealed that it belongs to a distinct lineage outside Pholiota sensu stricto. Multigene (ITS, 28S, rpb2) analyses by Tian and Matheny (2020) showed that collections of P. astragalinus form a strongly supported genus together with a new species, Pyrrhulomyces amariceps, separate from Pholiota and more closely allied to lineages containing Stropharia, Hypholoma and Phaeonematoloma.

Morphological characters uniting the genus Pyrrhulomyces include the bitter‑tasting, orange‑tinted pileus (cap) and stipe (stem) that blacken where bruised, absence of a germ pore in the spores (which are smooth under the light microscope but wrinkled (rugulose) under scanning electron microscopy), presence of golden refractive pleurochrysocystidia, a viscid pileipellis (ixocutis) and lignicolous habit.

== Description ==
The cap is 2–6 centimetres (3/4–2 1/4 in) broad, hemispheric to convex with a blunt umbo, viscid when moist and brilliant pink‑orange to salmon that fades and blackens with age; the margin is fibrillose, often bearing fleeting veil remnants. The gills are adnexed to adnate, close, yellowish‑brown, the edges paler and fimbriate. The stipe is 4–12 cm long and 4–8 mm thick, cylindrical and flexuous, fibrillose or scaly, often with a cobwebby annulus when young; flesh is orange, staining black on exposure, with a mild odour and bitter taste. The spore print is reddish‑brown to cinnamon.

Under the microscope, basidiospores measure 6–6.8–8 by 4–4.4–5 μm, ellipsoid to somewhat ovate in shape, thin‑walled, without a germ pore, pale yellowish‑brown in KOH, and brown in deposit. The basidia are narrowly clavate (club-shaped), 20–28 by 7–8 μm, four‑spored. Pleurocystidia are chrysocystidia—fusiform‑ventricose to clavate with golden inclusions—and measure 42–55 by 12–18 μm; cheilocystidia are narrow, with a long neck and obtuse apex. The pileipellis is an ixocutis of gelatinous hyphae, and clamp connections are present.

Though nonpoisonous, the species is regarded as inedible. DNA sequencing may be required to distinguish Pyrrhulomyces astragalinus from P. amariceps.

== Habitat and distribution ==
Pyrrhulomyces astragalinus
- Mycological characteristics
- Gills on hymenium
- Cap is conical or convex
- Hymenium is adnate or sinuate
- Stipe is bare
- Spore print is brown
- Edibility is unknown

Pyrrhulomyces astragalinus is saprotrophic on decaying wood, primarily of conifers, occurring on logs and stumps in late stages of decay. Fruiting usually occurs solitary or in small clusters, from late summer through autumn and, in mild coastal climates, into winter.

This species is widespread across temperate regions of the Northern Hemisphere: in Europe (e.g. Italy, Sweden, Switzerland), in East Asia (provinces of Jilin and Jiangxi in China) and in North America—from Alaska, British Columbia, Washington and Idaho eastward to Newfoundland and Maine, southward along the Pacific coast and in high‑elevation conifer forests of the southern Appalachians (North Carolina, Tennessee).
