= Lancing Ring =

Nature reserve in West Sussex, England

Coordinates: 50.843°N 0.323°W

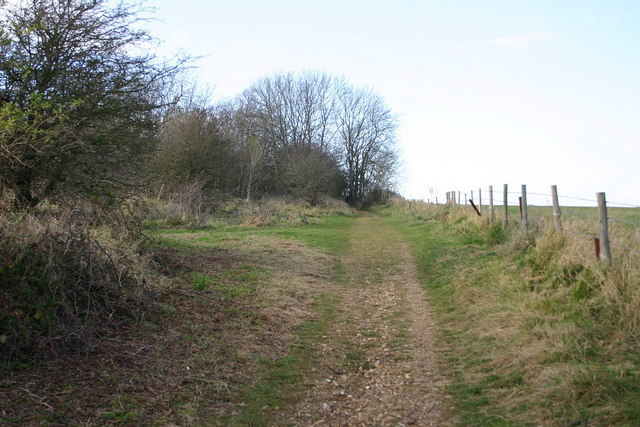
- Interactive map of Lancing Ring
- Type: Local Nature Reserve
- Location: Lancing, West Sussex
- OS grid: TQ 182 062
- Area: 29.4 hectares (73 acres)
- Manager: Ardur District Council
- Website: Ardur District Council Lancing Ring webpage

Lancing Ring is a 29.4-hectare (73-acre) Local Nature Reserve in Lancing in West Sussex. It is owned and managed by Adur District Council.

This chalk grassland site is notable for butterflies, adders, and common lizards. There is also deciduous woodland with wildflowers including early purple orchids and a dew pond, the habitat of dragonflies such as the broad-bodied chaser, Libellula depressa, and numerous newts.

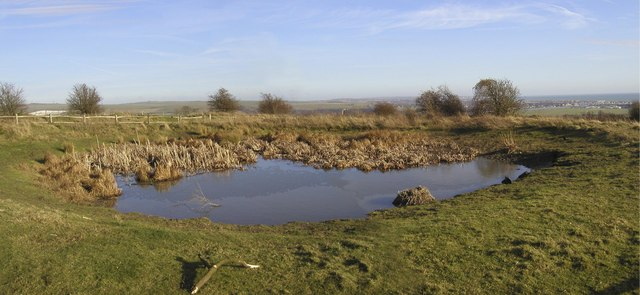
The Dew Pond

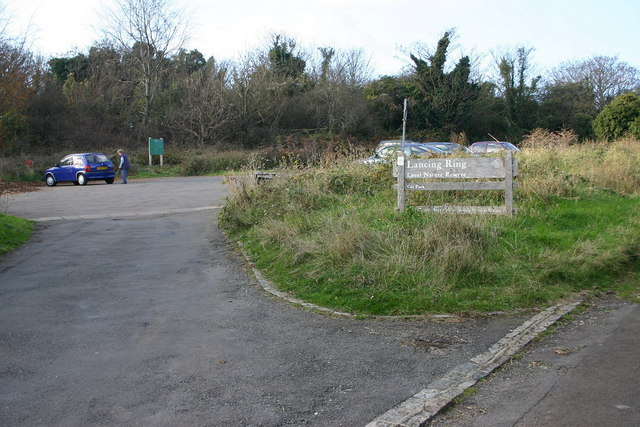
A spacious car park

There is access from Mill Road via the main car park and Halewick Lane has an area for parking beside the children's play area at the foot of the hill.

There is a volunteer group that assists Adur District council with conservation management, the Friends of Lancing Ring, formed in 1989.

== History ==
Archaeological research at Lancing Ring has identified it as the likely site of an Iron Age shrine and Romano-Celtic temple. The Romano-Celtic temple site has been identified as the large sloping field above the recycling centre and children's play area at the top of Halewick Lane; this land is now used for agricultural purposes. An Anglo-Saxon burial ground has also been identified to the east of Lancing Ring, towards Hoe Court. Iron Age, Roman and Anglo-Saxon coins have been discovered at Lancing Ring. The track passing through Lancing Ring from Cissbury Ring in the west to the river crossing in Shoreham in the east is likely prehistoric and would once have been an important route for those travelling through the area.

Though known locally as Lancing Clump, the name Lancing Ring was inspired by the planting of beech trees in a ring layout during the late 18th century, similar to the nearby Cissbury Ring. These are likely to have been planted by the Lloyd family after their acquisition of Lancing Manor in an attempt to gentrify the land. The 1987 storm caused extensive damage to many of the original trees.

A disused chalkpit is situated to the west of the car park at the top of Mill Road. Opened around 1805, it was described as a "public chalk pit" for local people to quarry chalk for construction work, building maintenance and for use in manure. It was permanently closed at the beginning of the 20th century following the death of a person collecting chalk from the site. The chalk pit is a geologically important feature as it contains a layer of Tarrant chalk and has yielded important fossil discoveries such as Pelmatopora lancingensis, a Bryozoan (moss animal) of the Cribrilinidae family; and a Crinoid, Bourgueticrinus cf. fritillus. Fossil discoveries from the site are now in the care of the British Museum.

At least one windmill stood at the eastern end of the chalkpit, with the most recent mill to occupy this site having been demolished in 1905. It is uncertain when the first windmill was erected at Lancing Ring, but there is mention of a mill in Lancing in the Domesday Book.

Lancing Ring was used by the Canadian Army during World War II.

In 1949, the land was sold to the local council by the Trustees of Lancing College for use as a permanent public open space for local people. The Friends of Lancing Ring group was established in 1989 with a view to protecting and conserving the land, performing restoration and maintenance work in conjunction with Adur Council and private organisations, and promoting the space to the people of Lancing. The group was instrumental in protesting the development of the A27 road through the area, which would have destroyed the site entirely.

== Flora, fauna, and funga ==
Lancing Ring is host to a great many species. This is helped by the wide range of habitats available within the nature reserve, including woodland, meadowland, pastureland, a dew pond and an old chalk pit.

Notable plants include reed mace, yellow flag iris, purple loosestrife, early purple orchids, wood anemones, arum lilies, spurge laurel and sweet violet. The county flower of Sussex, round-headed rampion, also grows here. Beech trees are abundant although there are also ash, common hawthorn (Crataegus monogyna), blackthorn, elder, wild cherry, sycamore and field maples present. Buddleja can be seen growing in the chalk pit and makes a beautiful display in early summer, attracting pollinating insects. North of the Lancing Manor allotments, McIntyres Field has been designated as a wildflower meadow; this is complemented by other meadowland interspersed throughout the site.

Dragonflies and damselflies can be observed around the dew pond. More rarely, adders and lizards can be spotted, particularly in the chalk pit.

Blackberries are abundant during the late summer months and several species of fungi can be found in the woodland in autumn, such as puffballs, Auricularia auricula-judae ('jelly ear mushrooms'), Macrolepiota procera ('parasol mushrooms') and 'shaggy pholiota' (either Pholiota squarrosa or P. squarrosoides).

A range of resident and migratory birds frequent the area. Great spotted woodpeckers, skylarks, redwings and jays have all reportedly been observed, and more common garden birds such as blue tits and robins can also be seen.

== Community use ==
Friends of Lancing Ring host events such as guided flower walks and volunteer sessions which focus on maintenance and conservation of the reserve.

An extensive network of paths lead from the site to Steyning, Coombes, Cissbury Ring and the River Adur, as well as further afield.
