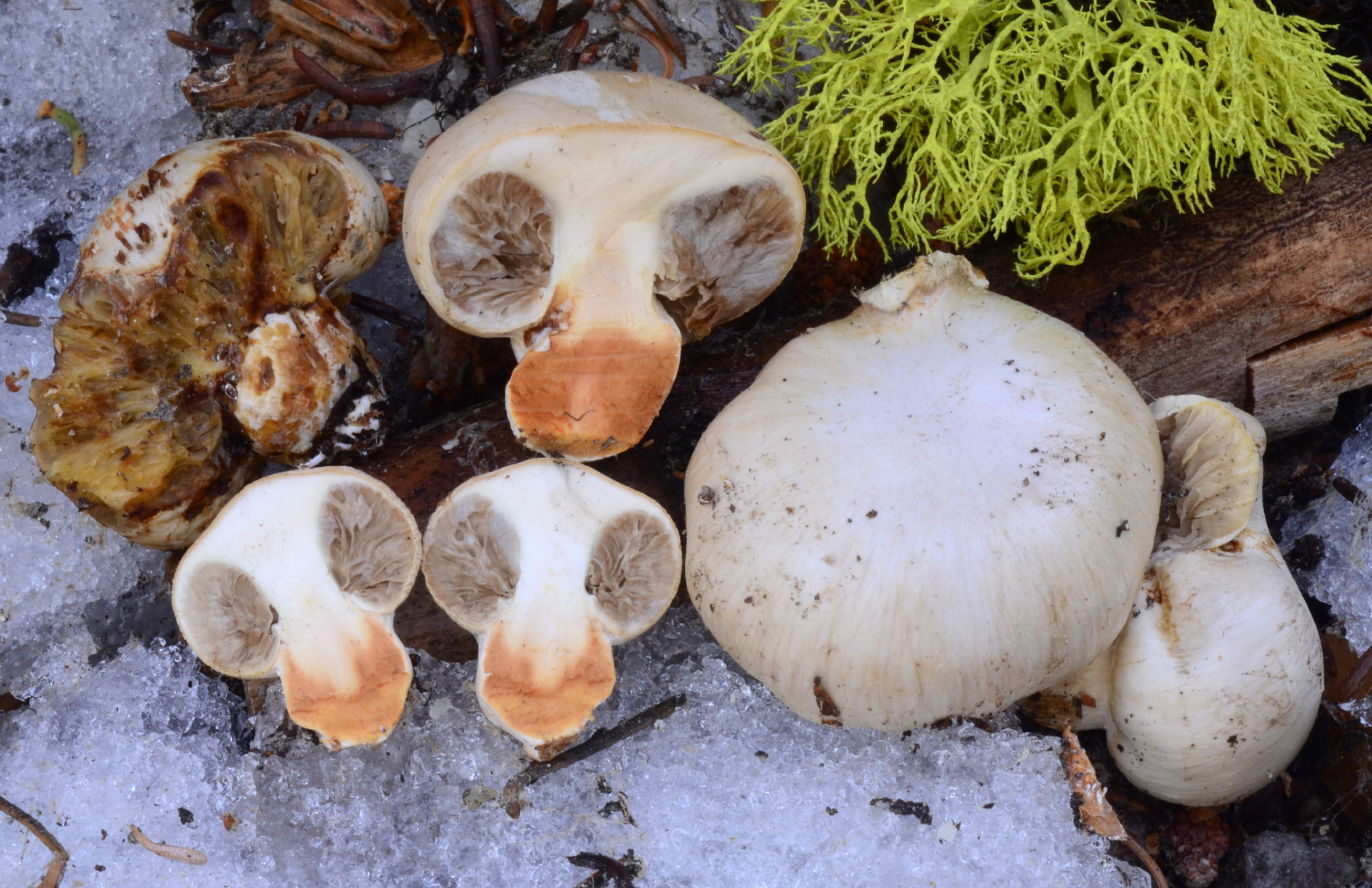

Conservation status
- Vulnerable (IUCN 3.1)

Scientific classification
- Kingdom: Fungi
- Division: Basidiomycota
- Class: Agaricomycetes
- Order: Agaricales
- Family: Strophariaceae
- Genus: Pholiota
- Species: P. nubigena

Binomial name
- Pholiota nubigena (Harkn.) Redhead (2014)

Synonyms
- Secotium nubigenum Harkn. (1899); Secotium rubigenum Harkn. ex. Lloyd (1903); Nivatogastrium nubigenum (Harkn.) Singer & A.H.Sm. (1959)

= Pholiota nubigena =

Species of fungus

Pholiota nubigena
- Mycological characteristics
- Glebal hymenium
- Cap is convex or depressed
- Hymenium attachment is not applicable
- Stipe is bare
- Ecology is saprotrophic
- Edibility is unknown

Pholiota nubigena, commonly known as the gastroid pholiota or the bubble gum fungus, is a species of secotioid fungus in the family Strophariaceae.

The fruit bodies appear similar to unopened mushrooms, measuring 1–4 centimetres (3/8–1 5/8 in) tall with 1–2.4 cm (3/8–1 in) diameter caps that are whitish to brownish. They have a short but distinct whitish stipe that extend through the internal spore mass (gleba) of the fruit body into the cap. The gleba consists of irregular chambers made of contorted gills that are brownish in color. A whitish, cottony partial veil is present in young specimens, but it often disappears in age and does not leave a ring on the stipe.

It is found in mountainous areas of the western United States, where it grows on rotting conifer wood, often fir logs. It fruits in spring, often under snow, and early summer toward the end of the snowmelt period in high mountain forests.

== Taxonomy ==
The species was first described in 1899 by American mycologist Harvey Willson Harkness as Secotium nubigenum. Harkness found the type collection growing on logs of lodgepole pine (Pinus contorta) in the Sierra Nevadas at an elevation of 7,000 feet (2,100 m). Curtis Gates Lloyd discussed the species in a 1903 publication, but named it rubigenum, stating that nubigenum was incorrect because of typographical errors carried down from Pier Andrea Saccardo. The genus Nivatogastrium was circumscribed by American mycologists Rolf Singer and Alexander H. Smith in 1959, who set N. nubigenum as the type and only species. They considered Lloyd's spelling rubigenum to be a misprint (sphalma typographicum). The holotype specimen was destroyed in the 1906 San Francisco earthquake. Modern molecular phylogenetic analysis has demonstrated that the species is nested within the genus Pholiota, and is closely related to Pholiota squarrosa and Pholiota multicingulata. Mycologist Scott Redhead transferred the species to Pholiota in 2014.

The specific epithet nubigenum derives from the Latin roots nub, meaning "cloud", and gen-, meaning "born of" or "originating from". It is commonly known as the "gastroid pholiota" or the "bubble gum fungus".

== Description ==
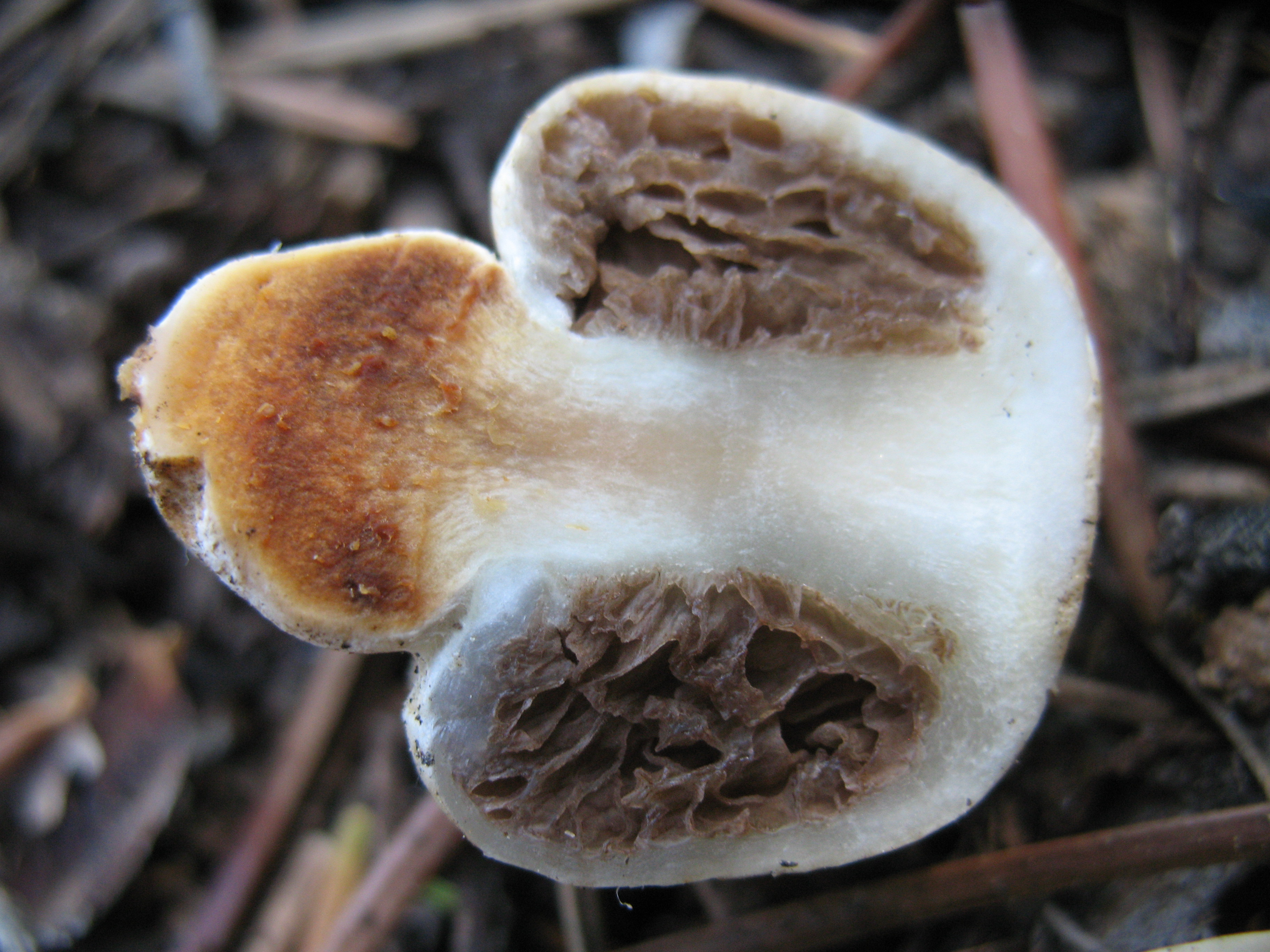
The fruit body features a short stipe/columella and a gleba comprising anastomosing gills.

The fruit bodies of N. nubigenum are 1.5–4 cm (5/8–1 5/8 in) tall and have round to convex caps measuring 1–2.4 cm (3/8–1 in) in diameter. In maturity, the center of the cap flattens out or develops a depression. Its color ranges from somewhat ochre to tawny to dirty yellow to whitish (especially in age), and the surface texture is smooth to slightly fibrillose. The cap is somewhat sticky when it is wet. In young specimens, the cap margin curves inward and is often lobed; as the mushroom matures the margin can either pull away from the stipe, or remain attached. The short and stout stipe measures 0.5–2 cm (1/4–3/4 in) long by 0.2–2 cm (1/8–3/4 in) thick; it extends into the cap, where it is known as the "columella". More or less equal in width throughout, or thicker on either end, its color is whitish to brownish to rusty-brown. The flesh of the cap is white and soft, while it is brownish and tougher in the stipe. Its odor ranges from mild to distinctly fruity, reminiscent of bubble gum. The gills, colored brown to cinnamon brown in maturity, are arranged as irregular, deformed plates that form internal chambers (locules); the gills may not become exposed until maturity, if at all. The partial veil, visible as whitish, cottony tissue extending from the cap margin to the stipe, often disappears in age. The edibility of the fungus is unknown. The fruit body development of Pholiota nubigena is classified as "pileate", meaning there is a single stalk with the gleba arranged with gill-like tramal plates; other fungi with a similar development include species of Podaxis.

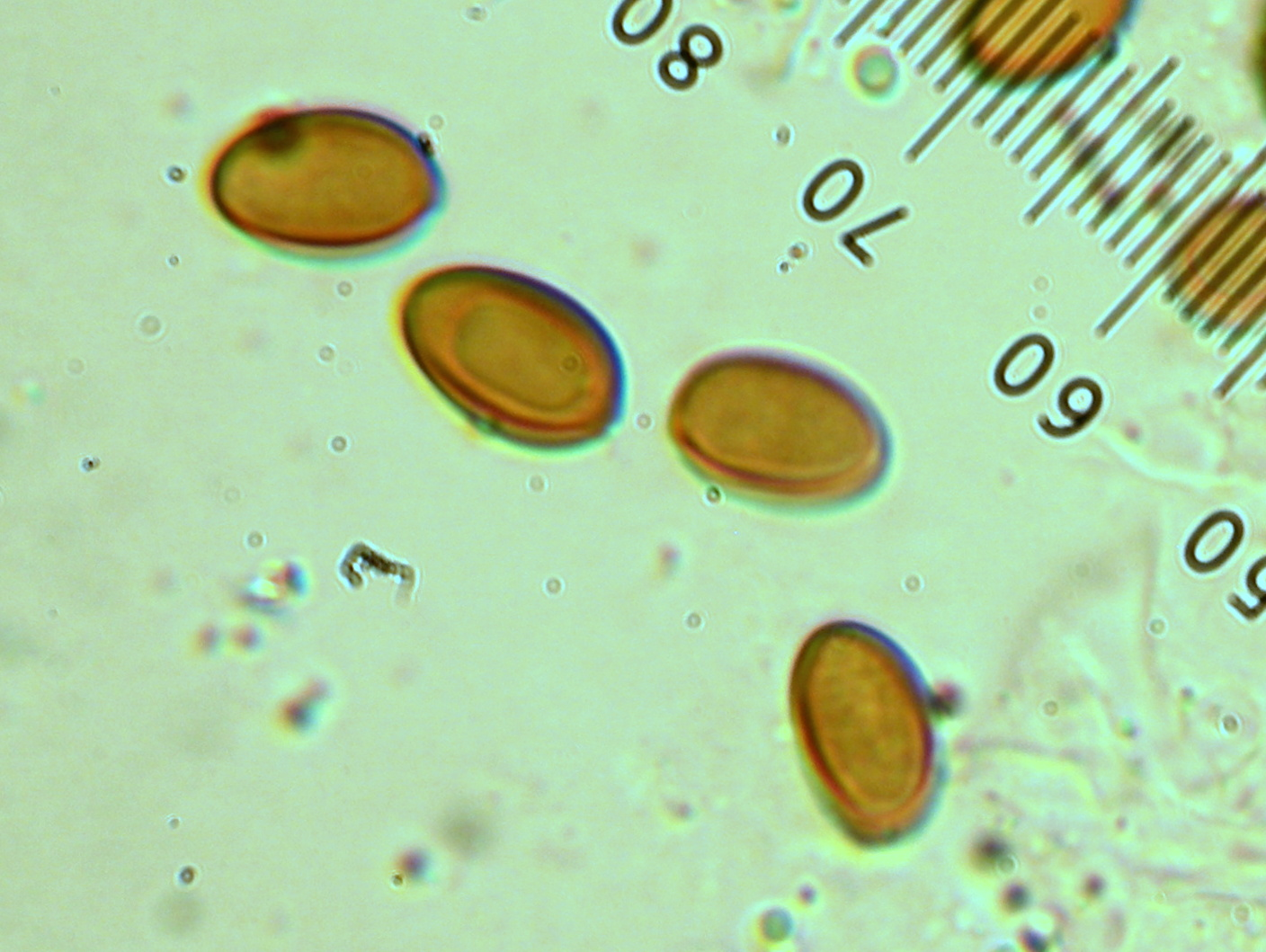
The spores are thick-walled and elliptical.

The smooth, thick-walled elliptical spores typically measure 7.5–10 by 5–7 μm. They have a narrow germ pore. The mushroom does not produce a spore print, but the spores are yellow-brown in mass. The basidia (spore-bearing cells) are hyaline (translucent), club-shaped, usually four-spored (some are two-spored), and measure 17–21 by 6–8.2 μm. Pseudoparaphyses (cells that grow down from the roof of locules, and often end up connecting the roof and the floor of the locule) are abundant in the gleba; they measure about 16 by 12.5 μm. Cystidia are yellowish to brownish, thin-walled, with dimensions of 60–100 by 15–25 μm. The peridium is made of two distinct tissue layers. The epicutis comprises narrow, gelatinous interwoven hyphae in a layer that is 15–50 μm. Underneath the epicutis is the subcutis, which consists of thin-walled hyphae up to 12 μm in diameter. All hyphae are inamyloid, and all have clamp connections.

=== Similar species ===
In 1971, Egon Horak described the species Nivatogastrium baylisianum, N. lignicola, and N. sulcatum from New Zealand, all of which differ from Pholiota nubigena by microscopic characters. N. baylisianum and N. sulcatum fruit on the ground (the former among mosses), while N. lignicola fruits on rotten wood. The three New Zealand Nivatogastrum species lack the fruity odor present in P. nubigena. Thaxterogaster pingue is somewhat similar in appearance to P. nubigena, but can be distinguished from the latter by its terrestrial habitat, autumn fruiting period and lack of odor. Some species of Weraroa are similar in morphology, but clearly distinct in their microscopic characteristics. Additionally, Weraroa species grow on hardwoods rather than conifer wood.

== Habitat and distribution ==
Pholiota nubigena fruits singly, in groups, or in small clusters on rotting conifer wood, especially fir and lodgepole pine. Fruiting in spring and early summer, it is a snowbank fungus, meaning it is often found near melting snow or soon after the snow has disappeared. In the United States, it is common in the Sierra Nevada and the Cascade Mountains, and usually found in elevations ranging from 1,650 to 2,400 m (5,410 to 7,870 ft). The fungus has been collected from the US states of California, Idaho, Oregon, and Washington. Squirrels consume the fungus, sometimes collecting fruit bodies and leaving them out in sunny spots to dry for later use.
