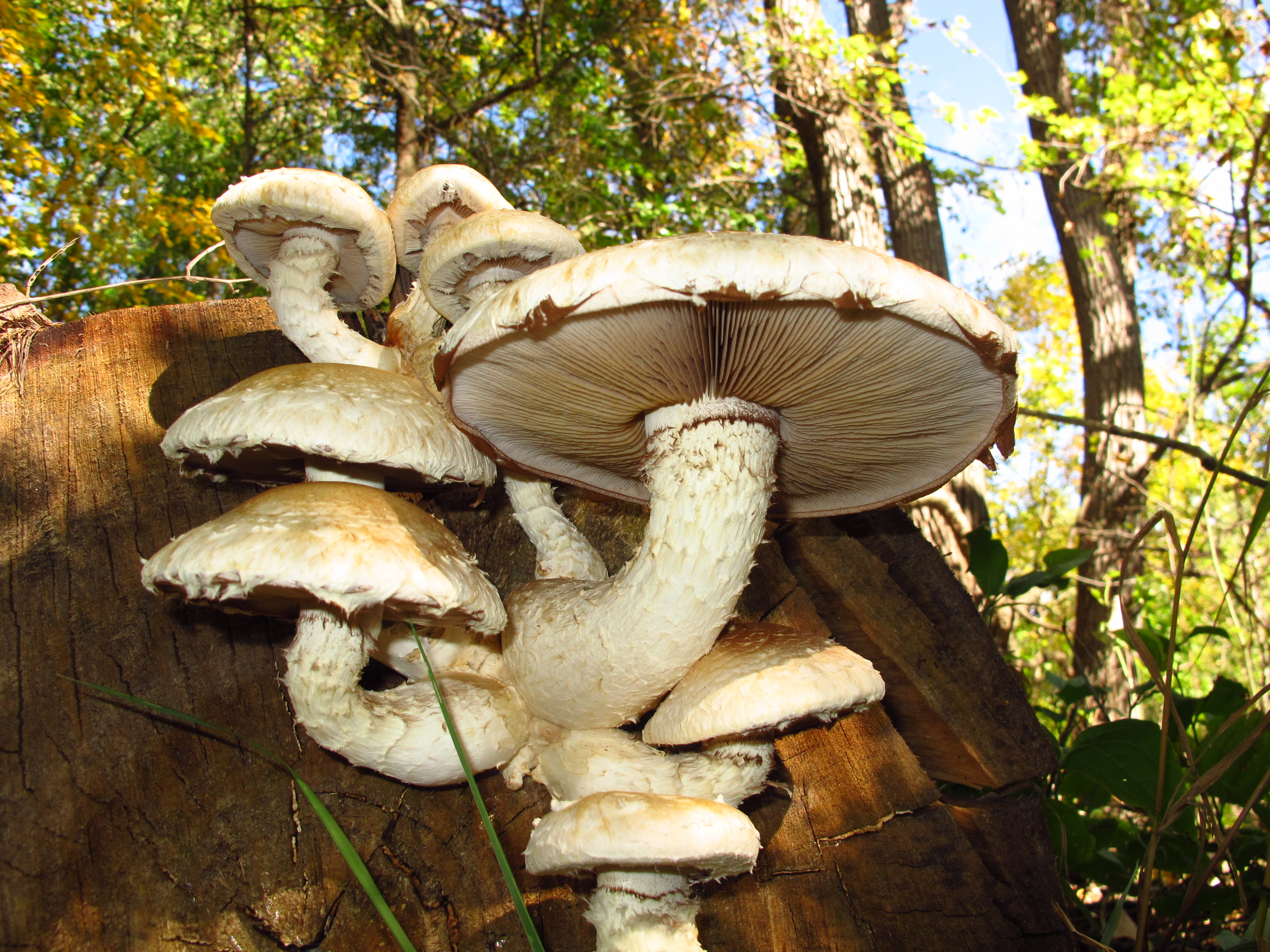
- Hemipholiota populnea

Scientific classification
- Kingdom: Fungi
- Division: Basidiomycota
- Class: Agaricomycetes
- Order: Agaricales
- Family: Strophariaceae
- Genus: Hemipholiota (Singer) Bon (1986)

Type species
- Hemipholiota populnea (Pers.) Kühner ex Bon (1986)

Species
- Hemipholiota heteroclita Hemipholiota populnea

Synonyms
- Pholiota subgen. Hemipholiota Singer (1962); Nemecomyces Pilát (1933)

= Hemipholiota =

Genus of fungi

Hemipholiota is a genus of agaric fungi in the order Agaricales. It was originally proposed by Rolf Singer in 1962 as a subgenus of Pholiota to contain species with absent or sparse pleurocystidia and absent chrysocystidia. Henri Romagnesi raised it to generic status in 1980, but this naming was invalid as it did not meet the requirements of the International Code of Nomenclature for algae, fungi, and plants. Marcel Bon published the genus validly in 1986.

Molecular analyses revealed that Hemipholiota was distinct from Pholiota and also from a new genus Hemistropharia that had been classified with Hemipholiota. Both genera fall outside of the Strophariaceae. The generic name required conservation against an older obscure name.

The Hemipholiota spore print is brown in its appearance.
