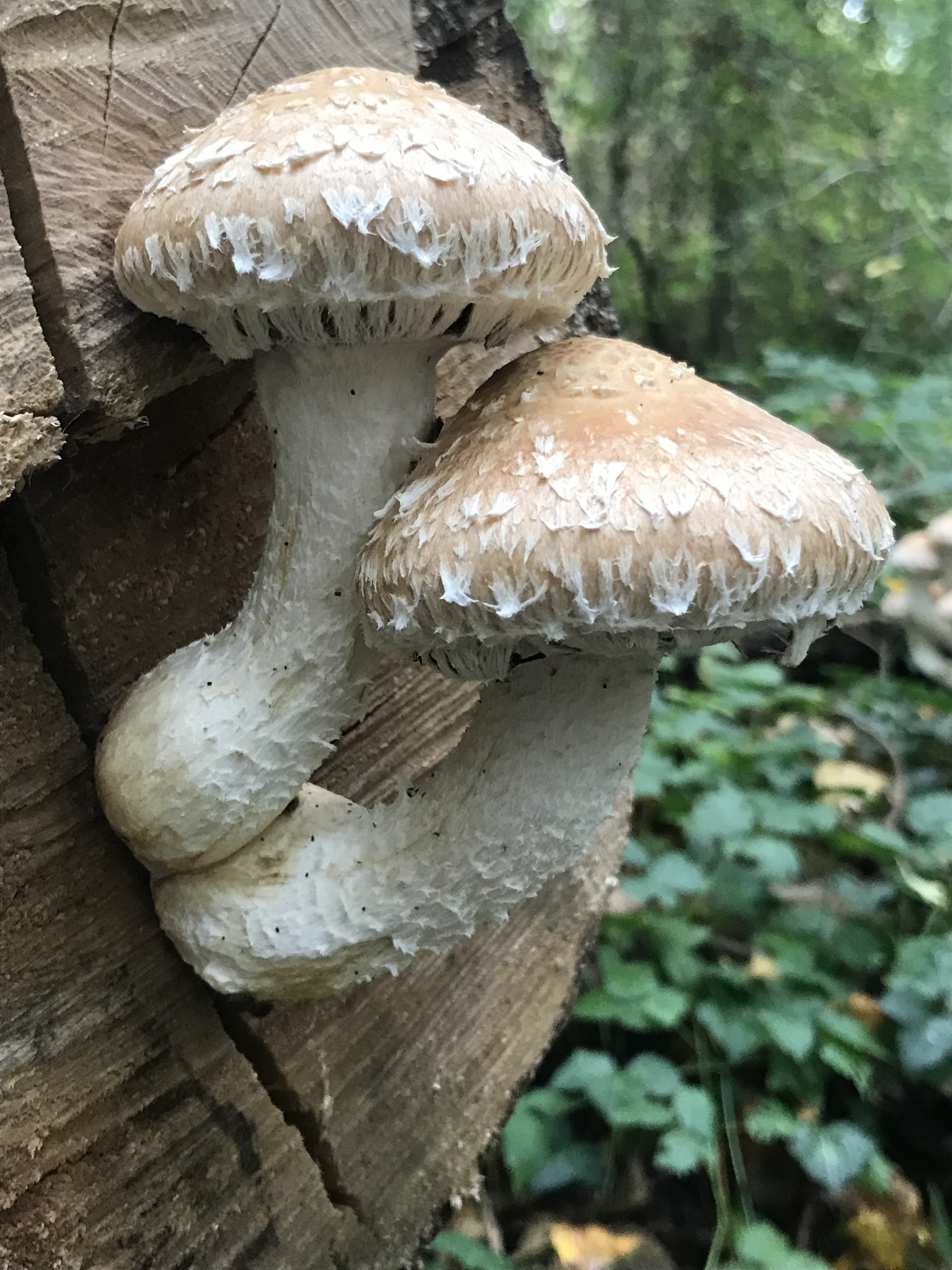
- Hemipholiota populnea fruiting on log

Scientific classification
- Kingdom: Fungi
- Division: Basidiomycota
- Class: Agaricomycetes
- Order: Agaricales
- Family: Strophariaceae
- Genus: Hemipholiota
- Species: H. populnea

Binomial name
- Hemipholiota populnea (Pers.) Bon (1986)

Synonyms
- Agaricus populneus Pers. (1828); Pholiota populnea (Pers.) Kuyper & Tjall. -Beuk. (1986); Pholiota destruens (Brond.) Gillet (1876) [1878]

= Hemipholiota populnea =

Species of mushroom-forming fungus

Hemipholiota populnea is a mushroom-forming fungus commonly known as destructive Pholiota, although separate from the genus Pholiota.

== Description ==
The tannish cap is up to 18 centimetres (7 in) wide and the stem is up to 10 cm (4 in) long. Remnants of the partial veil are present. The spore print is brown. The gills are adnate or sinuate and start out whitish, before becoming brown as the mushroom matures. It resembles Neolentinus ponderosus and members of Hypsizygus.

== Habitat and ecology ==
Hemipholiota populnea is saprobic and fruits on the wood of hardwood logs, especially cottonwood. It often grows from cut ends of logs or from naturally damaged areas on logs. It also grows from living trees sometimes. It is often found in riperian areas, and can be found in much of North America from September to November.
