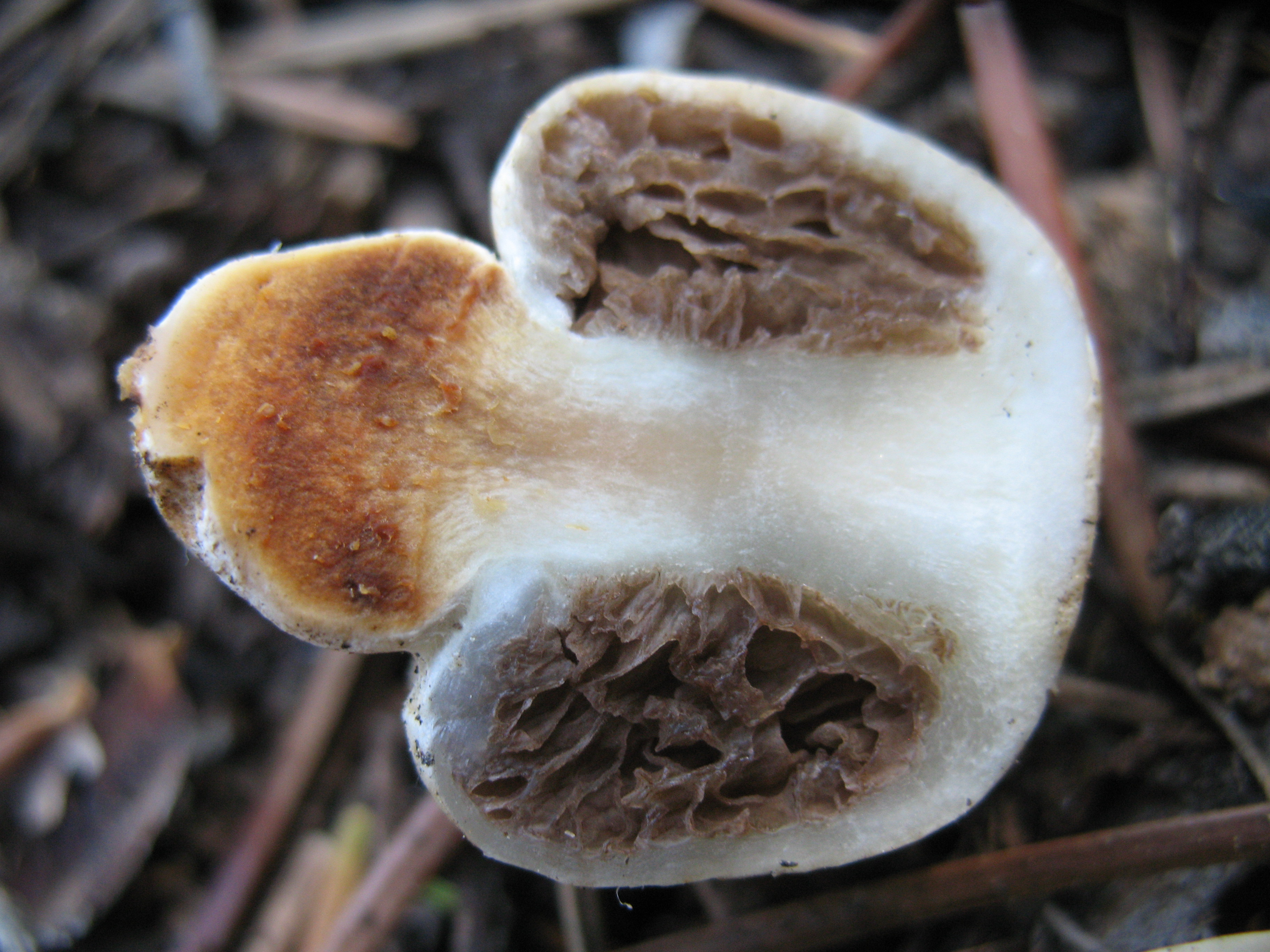
- Nivatogastrium nubigenum

Scientific classification
- Kingdom: Fungi
- Division: Basidiomycota
- Class: Agaricomycetes
- Order: Agaricales
- Family: Strophariaceae
- Genus: Nivatogastrium; Singer & A.H.Sm. (1959)

Type species
- Nivatogastrium nubigenum Singer & A.H.Sm. (1959)

Species
- N. lignicola N. sulcatum

= Nivatogastrium =

Genus of fungi

Nivatogastrium is a genus of secotioid fungi in the family Strophariaceae. The genus has contained four species found in North America and New Zealand, but the type species, Nivatogastrium nubigenum, is now considered to be a gasteroid species of Pholiota, and was transferred to that genus in 2014.

== Taxonomy ==
The genus was circumscribed by American mycologists Rolf Singer and Alexander H. Smith in 1959, who set N. nubigenum (then known as Secotium nubigenum Harkness) as the type and only species. In 1971, Egon Horak described the species N. baylisianum, N. lignicola, and N. sulcatum from New Zealand. N. baylisianum was moved to the genus Deconica in 2014.

The generic name is derived from two words, nivatus and gastrion; nivatus refers to the type locality, Sierra Nevada, and to the fact that the mature fruit bodies fade in color to white.
