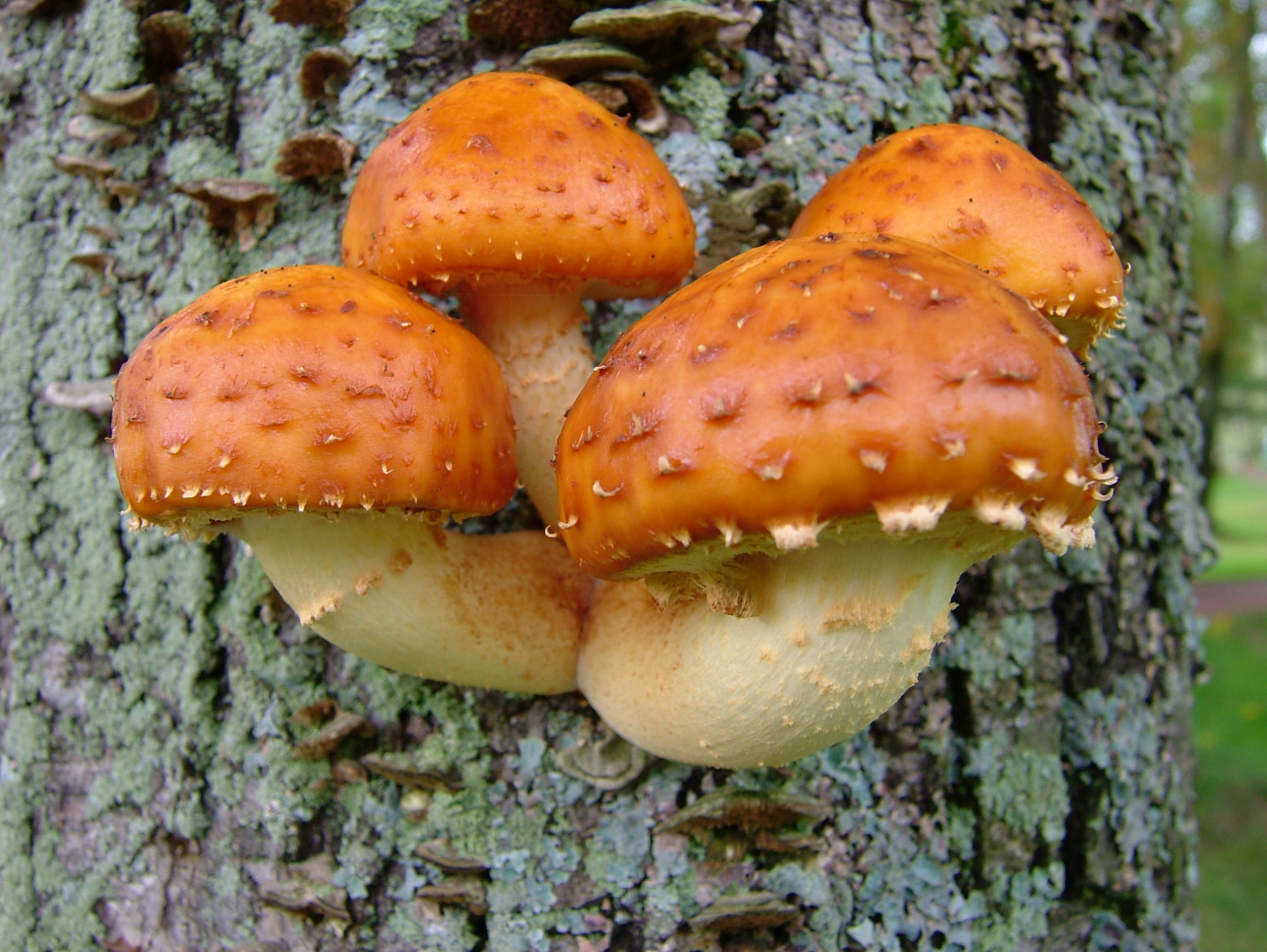

Scientific classification
- Kingdom: Fungi
- Division: Basidiomycota
- Class: Agaricomycetes
- Order: Agaricales
- Family: Strophariaceae
- Genus: Pholiota
- Species: P. adiposa

Binomial name
- Pholiota adiposa (Batsch) P.Kumm. (1871)

Synonyms
- Agaricus adiposus Batsch (1786); Dryophila adiposa (Batsch) Quél. (1886); Hypodendrum adiposum (Batsch) Overh. (1932)

= Pholiota adiposa =

Species of fungus

Pholiota adiposa is a slimy, scaly, yellow-brown mushroom. It is found in North America and Eurasia. It grows parasitically or saprotrophically, most often on beech species, fruiting in bunches between August and November. Several compounds produced by this mushroom, for example methyl gallate, are of interest for their medicinal properties.

== Taxonomy ==
It was originally described by German naturalist August Batsch in 1786 as a species of Agaricus. Paul Kummer transferred it to the genus Pholiota in 1871.

The name adiposa comes from the slimy, oily appearance of the cap.

== Description ==
The mushroom is fasciculate, meaning it grows in bunches. The cap is up to 9.5 centimetres (3 3/4 in) wide, yellow to orangish with dark, concentrically arranged scales. The gills are crowded and yellow to brown colored. The stipe is up to 12 cm (4 3/4 in) long, cylindrical, and broadening slightly at the base. The spore print is brown.

The spores are ovoid to ellipsoid, smooth, brown colored, and around 7.5–9.5 x 5–6.3 μm in size. These spores are carried on cylindrical or clavate basidia with 4 sterigmata, however occasionally only 2–3 are present. P. adiposa has chrysocystidia (25–56 x 7.5–11 μm) and cheilocystidia (20–50 x 5–17 μm). Cheilocystidia of P. adiposa can be fusiform, cylindrical, clavate, lageniform, or obovoid. All tissues of this fungus have clamp connections.

=== Similar species ===
Microscopy is needed to reliably identify the species.

P. adiposa and two closely related species, P. aurivella and P. limonella, are sometimes referred to as the P. adiposa complex. These species are morphologically very similar, but can be distinguished based on the spore size or substrate the fungus is growing on.

Pholiota squarrosoides is similar when young.

== Distribution and habitat ==
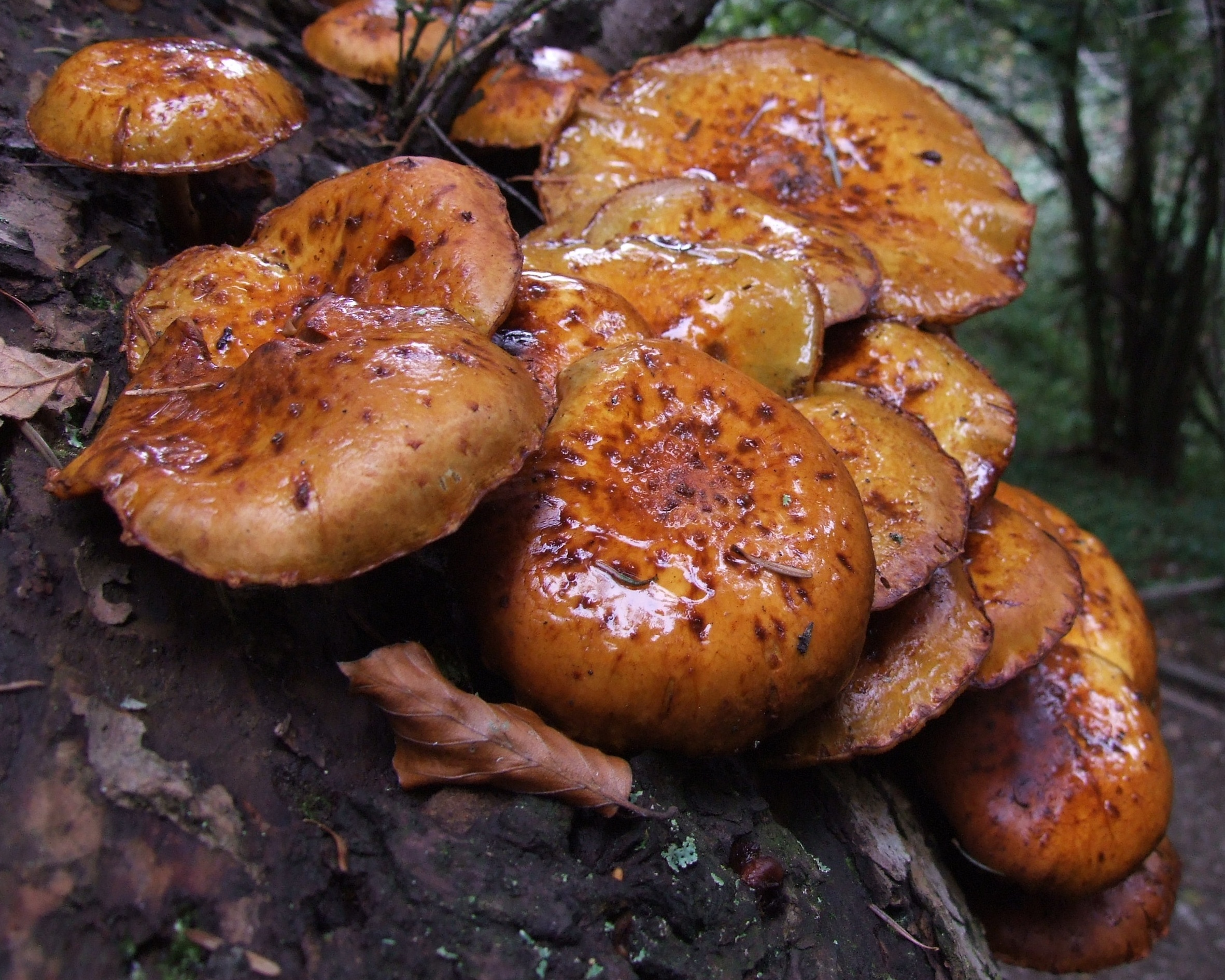
Photo showing slimy appearance of cap

P. adiposa has been documented in North America, Europe, and Asia. It can grow parasitically on live stems of trees, or as a saprotroph on dead wood. Substrates can be various beech species, poplar, and willow trees. Fruitification occurs between August and November, most commonly between September and October. P. adiposa grows above ground, as opposed to fungi which prefer buried wood. It can grow in temperature ranges between 10-30 °C, with an optimal temperature of 25 °C. Mycelial growth is severely suppressed below 5 °C or above 35 °C. In growth media. P. adiposa can grow in a pH of 5-9, growing the best at a pH of 6.

== Edibility ==
P. adiposa is traditionally considered to be edible and is regularly cultivated and consumed in many parts of Asia. However, due to anecdotal reports of gastrointestinal distress from consumption of this and closely related Pholiota species, some sources no longer recommend it out of an abundance of caution. No causative toxins have yet been identified.

== Bioactive compounds ==
P. adiposa produces many bioactive compounds that are of interest for potential medicinal properties. These include methyl gallate, Angiotensin 1-converting Enzyme (ACE) inhibitory peptide, and various polysaccharides with antitumor and antioxidant properties. The purported health benefits of this fungus has generated interest in improving the yields of commercially cultivated P. adiposa.

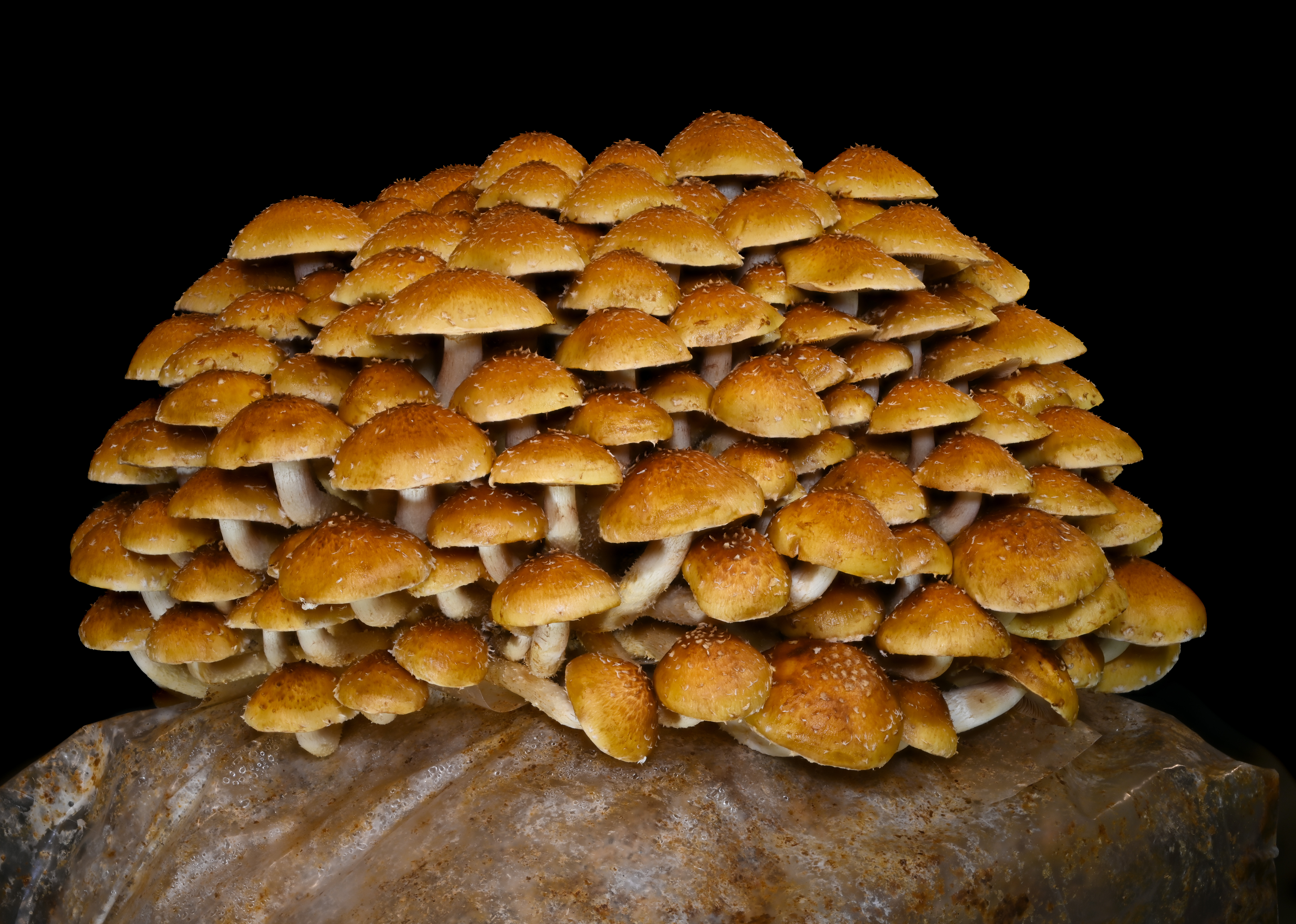
Cultivated Pholiota adiposa

=== Methyl gallate ===
P. adiposa is the first fungus from which methyl gallate has been extracted. Methyl gallate has been studied for its antioxidant and related HIV-1 treatment properties. Antioxidants isolated from natural sources are desired due to their generally low cytotoxicity. Methyl Gallate was shown to preferentially scavenge superoxide (O^{2-}) ions, which have been hypothesized to be involved in HIV-LTR activation.

=== Polysaccharides ===
Various polysaccharides isolated from P. adiposa have been shown to have anti tumor effects in mice. One dubbed SPAP2-1 interfered with the cell cycle and induced apoptosis in HeLa cells. Another called PAP-1a was combined with gold nanoparticles, increasing the macrophage count in mice. Other polysaccharides have been isolated which exhibit antioxidant effects. An overview of the literature on P. adiposa polysaccharides has suggested their antitumor abilities are closely tied to their antioxidant abilities.

== See also ==
- List of Pholiota species
