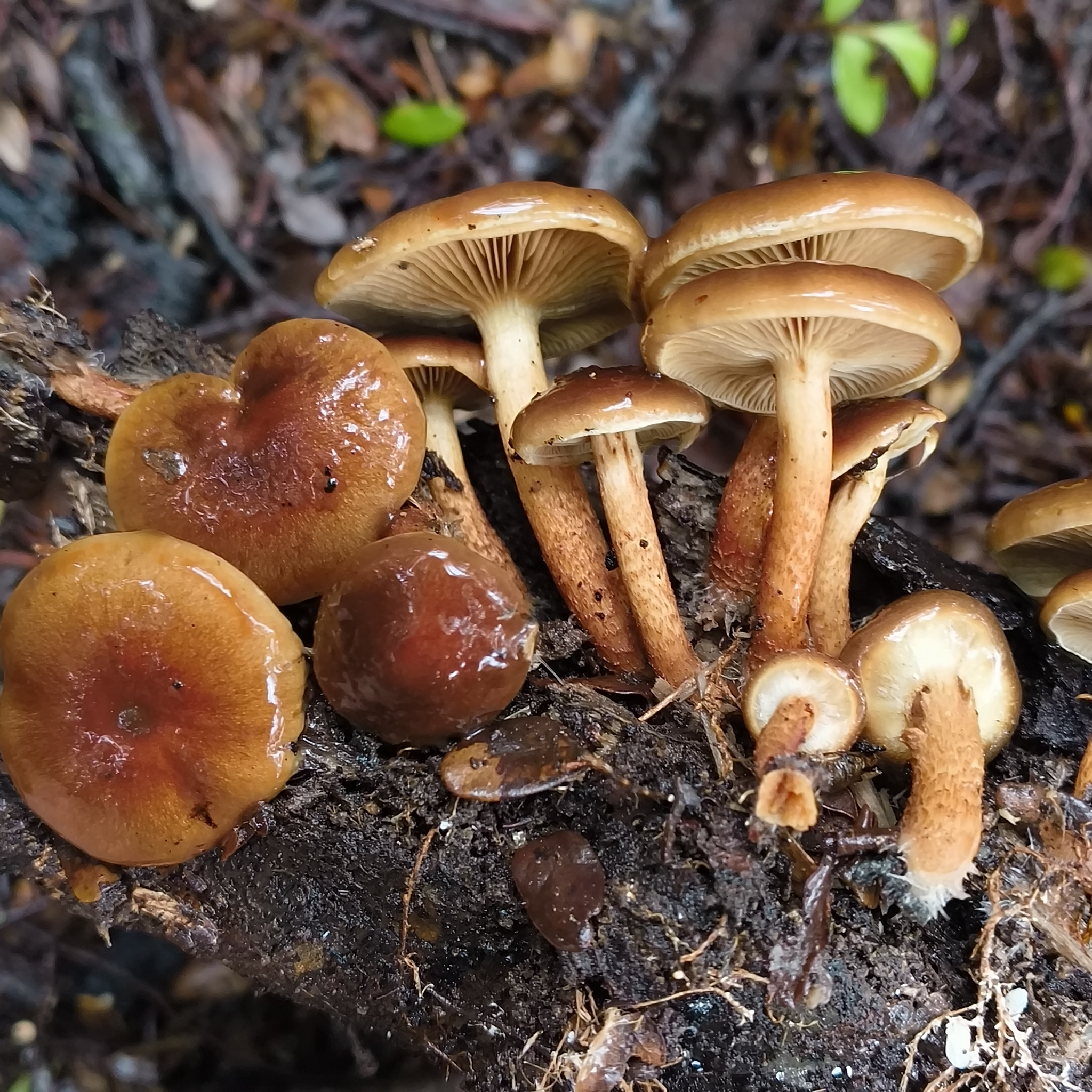
- Pholiota multicingulata fruiting bodies growing on Nothofagus wood

Scientific classification
- Kingdom: Fungi
- Division: Basidiomycota
- Class: Agaricomycetes
- Order: Agaricales
- Family: Strophariaceae
- Genus: Pholiota
- Species: P. multicingulata

Binomial name
- Pholiota multicingulata E.Horak (1983)

= Pholiota multicingulata =

Species of fungus

Pholiota multicingulata
- Mycological characteristics
- Gills on hymenium
- Cap is convex or umbonate
- Hymenium is adnate
- Stipe is bare or has a ring
- Spore print is yellow-brown
- Ecology is saprotrophic
- Edibility is poisonous

Pholiota multicingulata is a species of mushroom of the family Strophariaceae. It was first described by the Austrian mycologist Egon Horak in 1983. A saprotroph, P. multicingulata is primarily found on decaying wood, but can also be found on soil. It has been recorded in Australia, New Zealand, several countries in Asia, and Chile. P. multicingulata morphologically and microscopically ranges in colour and spore size, possibly due to climatic and regional variation. The species has been implicated in two non-fatal mushroom-poisoning cases in China.

== Taxonomy ==
Pholiota multicingulata was first described in 1983 by the Austrian mycologist Egon Horak in the Australian Journal of Botany. Horak examined two materials, one specimen from Australia, and the other from New Zealand. The Indian material resembles Pholiota scamba in some macroscopic and microscopic characters, but differs in its ventricose pleurocystidia and cheilocystidia. Matheny et al. (2015) have demonstrated through molecular phylogenetic analysis that the species is closely related to Pholiota squarrosa.

== Description ==
The fruit bodies (basidiocarps) of P. multicingulata have 17–34 mm or 55 mm wide caps (pilei). They are convex when young, with a slight central bump, becoming plano-convex at maturity. The cap is slimy when wet, and it has rings around the centre of the cap. It varies in colour, ranging from reddish-brown, yellowish-brown, or umber-brown, with a reddish-orange centre in some specimens. The margins are initially incurved, becoming plane at maturity. The gills (lamella) can also vary in colour, from greyish-white to grey, waxy-clay, or brown. The gills are adnate. The stipes are 32 × 4 mm or 55 × 5 mm in length and width. They are yellow near the apex and darker toward the base, cylindrical, hollow, and fibrillose. A partial veil is present in young specimens, and the rhizoids are found at the base. The fungus morphologically and microscopically ranges in colour and spore size, possibly due to climatic and regional variation. The species has been implicated in two non-fatal mushroom-poisoning cases in China.

The spores measure 6.5–8 × 4.5–5 μm. They are ovoid, smooth, and have a thickened wall and a distinct germ pore. The cystidia measure 40–70 × 10–15 μm long, are spindle-shaped, and are covered with a yellowish-brown incrustation. The pileipellis consists of gelatinised hyphae with brown pigments. Pholiota species have rusty-brown to yellow-brown spore prints.

== Distribution and habitat ==
Pholiota multicingulata was first recorded in Australia and New Zealand by Horak in his description of the species. The fungus has also been reported in Chile, China, Japan, Korea, Indonesia, and India. As a saprotroph, P. multicingulata decays dead organic material. Pholiota species are primarily found on decayed wood and are important wood decomposers. It has been recorded growing on coniferous wood and on wood from the genera Eucalyptus, Leptospermum, and Nothofagus. P. multicingulata does not exclusively grow on wood; it has also been recorded growing in leaf litter of bamboo (Dendrocalamus sp.) in the Kalimpong District in India. The fungus has also been reported growing in soil under a red pine (Pinus densiflora) dominated forest in South Korea.

== Works cited ==
Journals

- Cho, Hae Jin; Lee, Hyun; Park, Jae Young; Park, Myung Soo; Kim, Nam Kyu; Eimes, John A.; Kim, Changmu; Han, Sang-Kuk; Lim, Young Woon (2016). "Seven New Recorded Species in Five Genera of the Strophariaceae in Korea". Mycobiology. 44 (3): 137–145. doi:10.5941/MYCO.2016.44.3.137. PMC 5078126. PMID 27790064.
- Horak, E (1983). "Mycogeography in the South Pacific Region: Agaricales, Boletales". Australian Journal of Botany Supplementary Series. 13 (10): 1–42. doi:10.1071/BT8310001.
- Kim, Chang Sun; Han, Sang-Kuk; Nam, Jong Woo; Jo, Jong Won; Kwag, Young-Nam; Han, Jae-Gu; Sung, Gi-Ho; Lim, Young Woon; Oh, Seunghwan (2017). "Fungal communities in a Korean red pine stand, Gwangneung Forest, Korea". Journal of Asia-Pacific Biodiversity. 10 (4): 559–572. doi:10.1016/j.japb.2017.08.002.
- Li, Haijiao; Zhang, Hongshun; Zhang, Yizhe; Zhou, Jing; Yin, Yu; He, Qian; Jiang, Shaofeng; Ma, Peibin; Zhang, Yutao; Wen, Ke; Yuan, Yuan; Lang, Nan; Cheng, Bowen; Lu, Junjia; Sun, Chengye (2021). "Mushroom Poisoning Outbreaks — China, 2020". China CDC Weekly. 3 (3): 41–45. doi:10.46234/ccdcw2021.014. PMC 8392932. PMID 34594953.
- Matheny, P. Brandon; Moreau, Pierre-Arthur; Vizzini, Alfredo; Harrower, Emma; De Haan, Andre; Contu, Marco; Curti, Mariano (2 January 2015). "Crassisporium and Romagnesiella: two new genera of dark-spored Agaricales". Systematics and Biodiversity. 13 (1): 28–41. doi:10.1080/14772000.2014.967823. hdl:2318/152675.
- Molina, Lucía; Rajchenberg, Mario; de Errasti, Andrés; Aime, Mary Catherine; Pildain, María Belén (2020). "Sapwood-inhabiting mycobiota and Nothofagus tree mortality in Patagonia: Diversity patterns according to tree species, plant compartment and health condition". Forest Ecology and Management. 462 117997. doi:10.1016/j.foreco.2020.117997.
- Munir, E; Lutfia, A (2019). "Records of Culturable Endophytic Fungi Inhabiting Rhizome of Elettaria in Hutan Sibayak, North Sumatera". IOP Conference Series: Earth and Environmental Science. 305 (1) 012004. IOP Publishing. doi:10.1088/1755-1315/305/1/012004.
- Tamang, Juna; Thapa, Alisha; Acharya, Krishnendu (2023). "New record of Pholiota multicingulata (Strophariaceae) from India based on morphological data and phylogenetic analyses". Studies in Fungi. 8 (1): 1–5. doi:10.48130/SIF-2023-0004.
