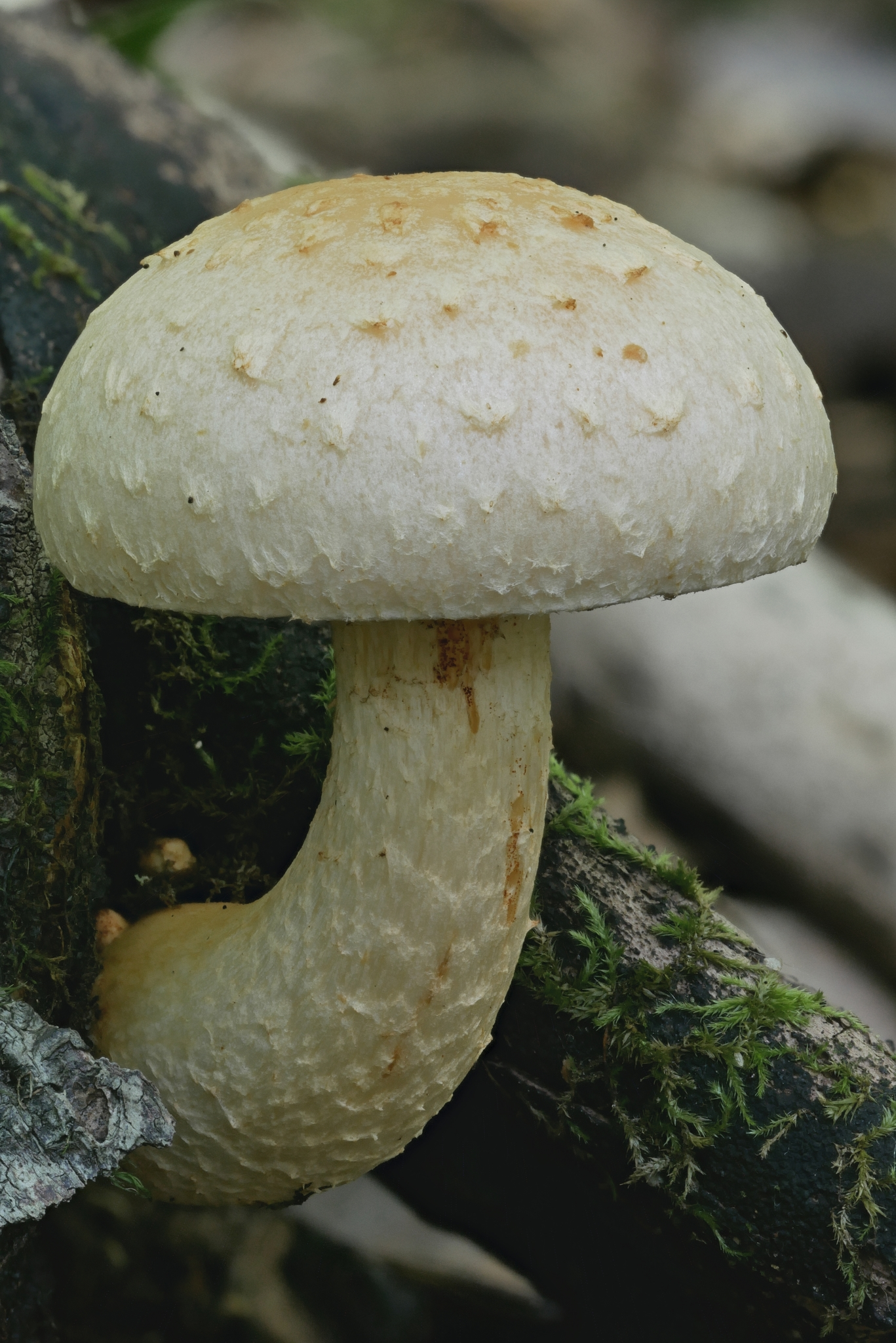

Scientific classification
- Kingdom: Fungi
- Division: Basidiomycota
- Class: Agaricomycetes
- Order: Agaricales
- Family: Strophariaceae
- Genus: Pholiota
- Species: P. heteroclita

Binomial name
- Pholiota heteroclita (Fr.) Quél.

= Pholiota heteroclita =

Species of fungus

Pholiota heteroclita is a species of fungus in the family Strophariaceae, first described by Elias Magnus Fries and given its current name by Lucien Quélet.

== Distribution and habitat ==
It appears in North America and Europe. It grows on hardwood, fruiting from July to October.
