= Phaeonematoloma =

Scientific classification
- Kingdom: Fungi
- Division: Basidiomycota
- Class: Agaricomycetes
- Order: Agaricales
- Family: Strophariaceae
- Genus: Phaeonematoloma (Singer) Bon (1994)

Type species
- Phaeonematoloma myosotis (Fr.) Bon (1994)

Synonyms
- Flammula subg. Phaeonematoloma Singer (1937); Pholiota subg. Phaeonematoloma (Singer) Singer (1951)

Genus of fungi

Phaeonematoloma is a small genus of slender, fleshy mushrooms in the family Strophariaceae with large, brownish spores with a germ pore and with conspicuous chrysocystidia. The genus has several assigned species but may be monotypic. The type species, Phaeonematoloma myosotis, grows along the edges of bogs in peaty soils and sometimes amongst Sphagnum or other mosses. This type species has been classified in Pholiota, Flammula, and in Hypholoma or the latter's synonymous generic name, Nematoloma, from which the generic name Phaeonematoloma is derived. Unlike Hypholoma (Nematoloma), Phaeonematoloma was originally partially differentiated by its brown spore print without the purplish colors of a "Nematoloma". Modern molecular evidence supports the recognition of Phaeonematoloma as an independent genus separate from Hypholoma and Pholiota. It is possible that other species may belong in this genus, which may include Bogbodia.
