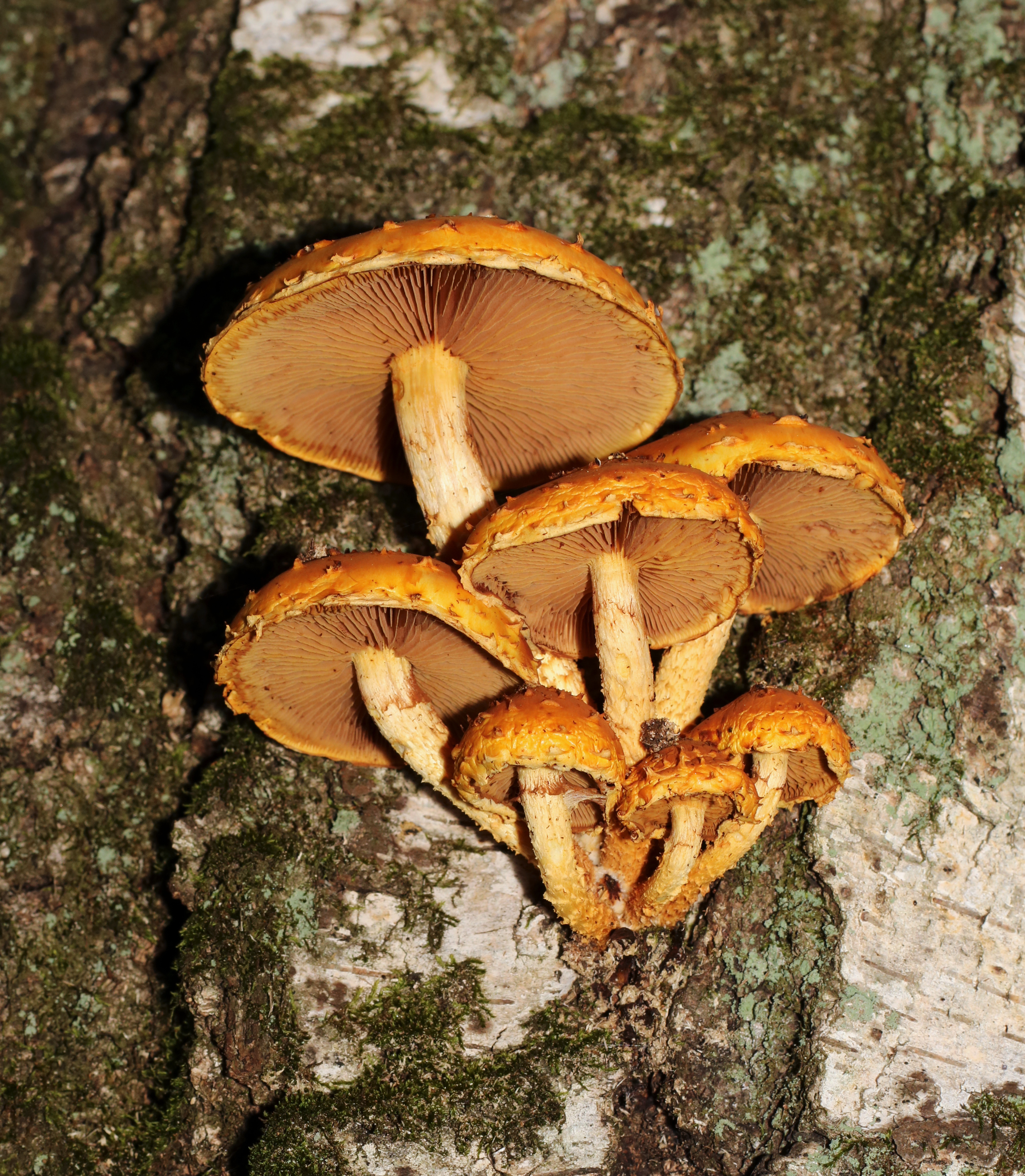

Scientific classification
- Kingdom: Fungi
- Division: Basidiomycota
- Class: Agaricomycetes
- Order: Agaricales
- Family: Strophariaceae
- Genus: Pholiota
- Species: P. aurivella

Binomial name
- Pholiota aurivella (Batsch) P.Kumm. (1871)

Synonyms
- Agaricus aurivellus Batsch (1786); Agaricus squarrosus var. aurivellus (Batsch) Pers. (1801); Lepiota squarrosa var. aurivella (Batsch) Gray (1821); Dryophila aurivella (Batsch) Quél. (1886); Hypodendrum aurivellum (Batsch) Overh. (1932)

= Pholiota aurivella =

Species of fungus

Pholiota aurivella
- Mycological characteristics
- Gills on hymenium
- Cap is campanulate
- Hymenium is adnate
- Stipe has a ring
- Spore print is brown
- Ecology is saprotrophic
- Edibility is not recommended

Pholiota aurivella, commonly known as the golden pholiota, is a species of fungus in the family Strophariaceae.

== Description ==
The cap is up to 16 centimetres (6 1/4 in) wide, bright to golden yellow, viscid when young and with relatively dark scales. The stem is up to 15 cm long, pale and is scaly closer to the bottom. It is sticky or slimy when moist. It reportedly tastes like unsweet marshmallows.

=== Similar species ===
Pholiota limonella and its subspecies are very similar, seeming to differ only in the spores.

== Habitat and ecology ==
P.aurivella grows in clusters on live or dead trees. It is found in native forest of New Zealand, southern Canada, and in the United States. It is frequently found in the American West and Southwest, especially in late summer and fall.

It been recorded as occasional food of the pleasing fungus beetle Triplax californica.

== Edibility ==
Most field guides list it as inedible, and though it has sometimes been consumed, it or similar species contain toxins that cause gastric upset.

== See also ==
- List of Pholiota species
