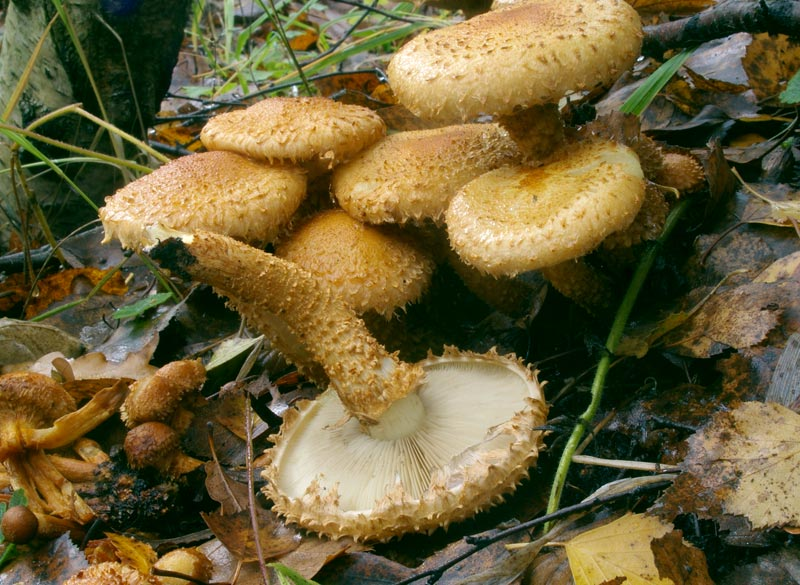
- Pholiota squarrosa

Scientific classification
- Kingdom: Fungi
- Division: Basidiomycota
- Class: Agaricomycetes
- Order: Agaricales
- Family: Strophariaceae
- Genus: Pholiota (Fr.) P.Kumm. (1871)

Type species
- Pholiota squarrosa (Bull.) P.Kumm. (1871)

Synonyms
- Agaricus "trib." Pholiota Fr. (1821); Agaricus ser. Derminus Fr. (1821); Derminus (Fr.) Staude (1857) nom. rej. Gymnocybe P.Karst. (1879); Dryophila Quél. (1886); Flammopsis Fayod (1889); Ryssospora Fayod (1889); Hypodendrum Paulet ex Earle (1909); Visculus Earle (1909)

= Pholiota =

Genus of mushrooms

Pholiota is a genus of small to medium-sized, fleshy mushrooms in the family Strophariaceae. They are saprobes that typically live on wood. The genus has a widespread distribution, especially in temperate regions, and contains about 150 species.

== Taxonomy ==
The genus contains about 150 species.

There have been several varying concepts of the genus, ranging from a pre-molecular era very broad concept that nowadays would include the genera Phaeolepiota, Phaeonematoloma, Flammula, Meottomyces, some Stropharia species, some Hypholoma species, Hemipholiota, Hemistropharia, some Kuehneromyces and some Phaeomarasmius, etc. Currently the genus is restricted to a smaller but still large group of species that primarily grow on wood, causing a white rot; other taxa occur on burnt ground following fires on peaty or forest soil, but none are known to be mycorrhizal.

=== Selected species ===
- P. aurivella (Batsch) P.Kumm.
- P. communis (Cleland & Cheel) Grgur. (southeastern Australia)
- P. flammans (Batsch) P.Kumm. — flaming scalycap
- P. iterata A.H.Sm. & Hesler — North America
- P. microspora (Berk.) Sacc. — nameko (China, Japan)
- P. nubigena (Harkn.) Redhead — bubblegum fungus (western United States)
- P. squarrosa (Oeder) Kumm. — shaggy scalycap (North America and Europe)
- P. squarrosoides (Peck) Sacc. (North America)
- P. variicystis G.Moreno & E.Valenz.

=== Etymology ===
Pholiota is derived from the Greek word pholis, meaning "scale".

== Description ==
The mushrooms have scaly and glutinous to dry cap surfaces. Many species have prominent partial veils and form an annulus or annular ring on their stipes. None of the species have purplish or purplish-brown spore prints. None form acanthocytes on their mycelia.

Usually, the species have pleurocystidia that include a type called chrysocystidia. The spores are brown, light brown, or yellowish brown in deposit. They are smooth with a germ pore, although the germ pore can be quite narrow in species.

== Distribution and habitat ==
The genus has a widespread distribution, especially in temperate regions.

The species frequently grow on wood or at the bases of trees or on decaying tree roots.
