= List of Galerina species =

This is a list of the species in the fungal genus Galerina.

- Galerina aberrans A.H. Sm. & Singer (1955)
- Galerina acicola A.H. Sm. & Singer (1955)
- Galerina acris Gulden (1980)
- Galerina acuminata (Murrill) A.H. Sm. (1938)
- Galerina agloea A.H. Sm. & Singer (1955)
- Galerina aimara Singer (1964)
- Galerina albotomentosa (D.A. Reid) E. Horak & P.-A. Moreau (2005)
- Galerina allospora A.H. Sm. & Singer (1955)
- Galerina alluviana A.H. Sm. (1964)
- Galerina alpestris Singer (1974)
- Galerina alpina (E. Horak) E. Horak & Watling (1981)
- Galerina alutacea A.E. Wood (2001)
- Galerina ampullaceocystis P.D. Orton (1960)
- Galerina andina Singer (1964)
- Galerina anelligera A.H. Sm. & Singer (1958)
- Galerina angustifolia A.H. Sm. & Singer (1964)
- Galerina annulata (J. Favre) Singer (1973)
- Galerina antarctica Singer (1962)
- Galerina aquatilis (Fr.) S. Lundell (1953)
- Galerina arctica (Singer) Nezdojm. (1982)
- Galerina arenaria Singer (1954)
- Galerina arenicola A.H. Sm. (1964)
- Galerina asteliae Singer (1969)
- Galerina atkinsoniana A.H. Sm. (1953)
- Galerina aureopilea A.E. Wood (2001)
- Galerina austroandina (Singer) Singer (1969)
- Galerina austrocalyptrata A.H. Sm. & Singer (1964)
- Galerina badipes (Pers.) Kühner (1935)
- Galerina bambusae E. Horak (1988)
- Galerina beatricis Bas (1996)
- Galerina beinrothii Bresinsky (1966)
- Galerina berteroana Singer (1969)
- Galerina boliviana Singer (1964)
- Galerina borealis A.H. Sm. & Singer (1958)
- Galerina bresadolana Bon (1983)
- Galerina brunneomarginata (Murrill) A.H. Sm. & Singer (1964)
- Galerina bryophila (Murrill) A.H. Sm. & Singer (1958)
- Galerina bulliformis B.J. Rees (1999)
- Galerina bullulifera Singer (1952)
- Galerina bunyaensis A.E. Wood (2001)
- Galerina cainii A.H. Sm. (1964)
- Galerina caldariorum Svrček (1994)
- Galerina californica A.H. Sm. & Singer (1958)
- Galerina calyptrata P.D. Orton (1960)
- Galerina camarinoides A.H. Sm. (1953)
- Galerina camerina (Fr.) Kühner (1955)
- Galerina capitata A.E. Wood (2001)
- Galerina carbonicola A.H. Sm. (1953)
- Galerina cascadensis A.H. Sm. & Singer (1955)
- Galerina castaneipes A.H. Sm. & Singer (1958)
- Galerina castanescens A.H. Sm. & Singer (1958)
- Galerina caulocystidiata Arnolds (1982)
- Galerina cephalotricha Kühner (1973)
- Galerina cerina A.H. Sm. & Singer (1955)
- Galerina chionophila Senn-Irlet (1986)
- Galerina cinctula P.D. Orton (1960)
- Galerina cingulata Singer (1964)
- Galerina cinnamomea A.H. Sm. & Singer (1958)
- Galerina clavata (Velen.) Kühner (1935)
- Galerina clavuligera (Romagn.) P.-A. Moreau (2005)
- Galerina columbiana Singer (1973)
- Galerina conspicua Singer (1969)
- Galerina coquimbensis Singer (1969)
- Galerina corcontica Svrček (1983)
- Galerina cortinarioconfusa V.L. Wells & Kempton (1969)
- Galerina cortinarioides A.H. Sm. (1953)
- Galerina cuspidata A.H. Sm. (1953)
- Galerina decipiens A.H. Sm. & Singer (1955)
- Galerina depressodisca V.L. Wells & Kempton (1969)
- Galerina detriticola Svrček (1983)
- Galerina diabolissima A.H. Sm. (1957)
- Galerina dicranorum A.H. Sm. & Singer (1958)
- Galerina dimorphocystis A.H. Sm. & Singer (1955)
- Galerina discernibilis Singer (1973)
- Galerina discreta E. Horak, Senn-Irlet, Curti & Musumeci (2009)
- Galerina dominici Singer (1964)
- Galerina elaeophylla Singer (1969)
- Galerina embolus (Fr.) P.D. Orton (1960)
- Galerina emmetensis A.H. Sm. & Singer (1955)
- Galerina esteveraventosii Siquier, Olariaga, Salom & Høil. (2021)
- Galerina evelata (Singer) A.H. Sm. & Singer (1964)
- Galerina excentrica E. Horak (1988)
- Galerina fallax A.H. Sm. & Singer (1955)
- Galerina farinacea A.H. Sm. (1957)
- Galerina farinosipes A.H. Sm. (1953)
- Galerina fasciculata Hongo (1974)
- Galerina favrei Bon (1986)
- Galerina fennica A.H. Sm. (1964)
- Galerina ferruginea A.H. Sm. (1953)
- Galerina fibrillosa A.H. Sm. (1953)
- Galerina filiformis A.H. Sm. & Singer (1958)
- Galerina fontinalis A.H. Sm. (1964)
- Galerina fuegiana Singer (1953)
- Galerina funariae A.H. Sm. & Singer (1955)
- Galerina fuscobrunnea A.H. Sm. (1953)
- Galerina gamundiae Singer (1964)
- Galerina gibbosa J. Favre (1936)
- Galerina glacialis Singer (1945)
- Galerina glebarum (Berk.) Singer (1969)
- Galerina gloeocystis Pegler (1977)
- Galerina graminea (Velen.) Kühner (1935)
- Galerina griseipes Kühner (1973)
- Galerina harrisonii (Dennis) Bas & Vellinga (1986)
- Galerina heimansii Reijnders (1959)
- Galerina helvoliceps (Berk. & M.A. Curtis) Singer (1951)
- Galerina hepaticicola (Murrill) A.H. Sm. & Singer (1964)
- Galerina heterocystis (G.F. Atk.) A.H. Sm. & Singer (1958)
- Galerina humicola A.H. Sm. (1953)
- Galerina hybrida Kühner (1969)
- Galerina hygrophila Arnolds (1982)
- Galerina hypnicola (P. Karst.) A.H. Sm. & Singer (1958)
- Galerina hypnorum (Schrank) Kühner (1935)
- Galerina hypophaea Kühner (1973)
- Galerina hypsizyga Singer (1964)
- Galerina inaequalis E. Horak (1988)
- Galerina inconspicua Singer (1954)
- Galerina incrustata B.J. Rees (1999)
- Galerina indica K.P.D. Latha & Manim. (2014)
- Galerina infernalis Singer (1964)
- Galerina inflata A.E. Wood (2001)
- Galerina insignis A.H. Sm. (1953)
- Galerina inundata Arnolds (1982)
- Galerina jaapii A.H. Sm. & Singer (1955)
- Galerina karstenii A.H. Sm. & Singer (1964)
- Galerina lacustris A.H. Sm. (1953)
- Galerina laeta Singer (1964)
- Galerina larigna Singer (1945)
- Galerina lateritia (Murrill) Singer (1950)
- Galerina laticeps A.H. Sm. (1953)
- Galerina latispora A.H. Sm. & Singer (1955)
- Galerina leonina A.E. Wood (2001)
- Galerina leptocystis V.L. Wells & Kempton (1969)
- Galerina leucobryicola A.H. Sm. & Singer (1958)
- Galerina lignatilis V.L. Wells & Kempton (1969)
- Galerina longinqua A.H. Sm. & Singer (1958)
- Galerina longispora Raithelh. (1977)
- Galerina lubrica A.H. Sm. (1964)
- Galerina lurida A.E. Wood (2001)
- Galerina luteolosperma A.H. Sm. & Singer (1955)
- Galerina machangaraensis Singer (1977)
- Galerina macquariensis A.H. Sm. & Singer (1958)
- Galerina macrocystis A.E. Wood (2001)
- Galerina macrospora (Velen.) Singer (1950)
- Galerina mainsii A.H. Sm. & Singer (1958)
- Galerina mairei Boutev. & P.-A. Moreau (2005)
- Galerina majalis Singer (1989)
- Galerina makereriensis Pegler (1966)
- Galerina mammillata (Murrill) A.H. Sm. & Singer (1958)
- Galerina marginata (Batsch) Kühner (1935)
- Galerina marthae Singer (1969)
- Galerina megalocystis A.H. Sm. & Singer (1955)
- Galerina melleobrunnea A.E. Wood (2001)
- Galerina meridionalis Singer & Clémençon (1971)
- Galerina mesites A.H. Sm. & Singer (1955)
- Galerina microcephala (Speg.) Singer (1952)
- Galerina minima (Peck) A.H. Sm. & Singer (1964)
- Galerina minor Singer (1954)
- Galerina mniophila (Lasch) Kühner (1935)
- Galerina mollis A.H. Sm. & Singer (1955)
- Galerina mongaensis A.E. Wood (2001)
- Galerina montivaga Singer (1969)
- Galerina muscolignosa A.E. Wood (2001)
- Galerina mycenaeformis B.E. Lechner & J.E. Wright (2006)
- Galerina mycenoides (Fr.) Kühner (1935)
- Galerina nana (Petri) Kühner (1935)
- Galerina nancyae A.H. Sm. (1964)
- Galerina nasuta (Kalchbr.) Pegler (1965)
- Galerina naucorioides A.H. Sm. & Singer (1955)
- Galerina neocalyptrata A.E. Wood (2001)
- Galerina nigripes A.H. Sm. & Singer (1958)
- Galerina nordmanniana A.H. Sm. & Singer (1958)
- Galerina norvegica A.H. Sm. (1964)
- Galerina nothofaginea E. Horak (1988)
- Galerina nubigena A.H. Sm. & Singer (1964)
- Galerina nybergii A.H. Sm. (1964)
- Galerina nyula Grgur. (1997)
- Galerina obscurata A.H. Sm. (1964)
- Galerina occidentalis A.H. Sm. (1953)
- Galerina odora A.H. Sm. (1953)
- Galerina ohiarum E. Horak & Desjardin (1996)
- Galerina oinodes (Berk. & M.A. Curtis) Singer (1973)
- Galerina oligocalyptrata Singer (1989)
- Galerina olympiana A.H. Sm. (1953)
- Galerina oregonensis A.H. Sm. (1964)
- Galerina oreina A.H. Sm. & Singer (1955)
- Galerina oreophila A.E. Wood (2001)
- Galerina ovalispora Kalamees (1981)
- Galerina pallida (Pilát) E. Horak & M.M. Moser (1967)
- Galerina pallidispora A.H. Sm. (1953)
- Galerina paludinella P.D. Orton (1988)
- Galerina paludosa (Fr.) Kühner (1935)
- Galerina papillata Singer (1952)
- Galerina patagonica Singer (1954)
- Galerina payettensis A.H. Sm. & Singer (1958)
- Galerina pectinata (Sacc.) Courtec. (1996)
- Galerina peladae Singer (1969)
- Galerina perangusta A.H. Sm. & Singer (1958)
- Galerina perianiana (Sacc. & Cub.) Pegler (1975)
- Galerina permixta (P.D. Orton) Pegler (1975)
- Galerina perplexa A.H. Sm. (1964)
- Galerina perrara Singer (1962)
- Galerina phillipsii D.A. Reid (1984)
- Galerina phlegmacioides Singer (1969)
- Galerina physospora Singer (1952)
- Galerina pistillicystis (G.F. Atk.) A.H. Sm. & Singer (1958)
- Galerina platyphylla (Kauffman) A.H. Sm. & Singer (1964)
- Galerina polytrichorum Singer (1964)
- Galerina praetervisa Singer (1964)
- Galerina praticola (F.H. Møller) P.D. Orton (1960)
- Galerina proxima A.H. Sm. & Singer (1964)
- Galerina pruinatipes A.H. Sm. (1953)
- Galerina psathyrelloides A.H. Sm. (1957)
- Galerina pseudocerina A.H. Sm. & Singer (1958)
- Galerina pseudomniophila Kühner (1973)
- Galerina pseudomycenopsis Pilát (1954)
- Galerina pseudostylifera A.H. Sm. (1964)
- Galerina pseudotundrae Kühner (1973)
- Galerina pteridicola A.H. Sm. (1964)
- Galerina pubescentipes A.H. Sm. & Singer (1964)
- Galerina pucarensis Singer (1969)
- Galerina pulchra A.H. Sm. & Singer (1964)
- Galerina pumila (Pers.) Singer (1961)
- Galerina quinteroensis Singer (1969)
- Galerina radicellicola Singer (1964)
- Galerina rainierensis A.H. Sm. & Singer (1964)
- Galerina reflexa (Murrill) A.H. Sm. & Singer (1964)
- Galerina riparia Singer (1953)
- Galerina robertii E. Horak (1994)
- Galerina rostrata A.H. Sm. & Singer (1958)
- Galerina rudericola A.H. Sm. (1953)
- Galerina rugisperma A.H. Sm. (1953)
- Galerina rugosa A.E. Wood (2001)
- Galerina sabuletorum A.H. Sm. (1964)
- Galerina sahleri (Quél.) Kühner (1948)
- Galerina salicicola P.D. Orton (1960)
- Galerina saltensis Singer (1952)
- Galerina sancti-xaveri Singer (1973)
- Galerina semiglobata Singer (1954)
- Galerina semilanceata (Peck) A.H. Sm. & Singer (1964)
- Galerina septentrionalis A.H. Sm. (1964)
- Galerina sequoiae Singer (1989)
- Galerina sideroides (Bull.) Kühner (1935)
- Galerina similis Kühner (1973)
- Galerina simocyboides Singer (1969)
- Galerina smithii Blanco-Dios (2021)
- Galerina spegazziniana E. Horak (1967)
- Galerina sphagnicola (G.F. Atk.) A.H. Sm. & Singer (1964)
- Galerina sphagnorum (Pers.) Kühner (1935)
- Galerina stagnina (Fr.) Kühner (1935)
- Galerina steglichii Besl (1993)
- Galerina stordalii A.H. Sm. (1964)
- Galerina stylifera (G.F. Atk.) A.H. Sm. & Singer (1958)
- Galerina subannulata (Singer) A.H. Sm. & Singer (1964)
- Galerina subarctica A.H. Sm. & Singer (1964)
- Galerina subbadia A.H. Sm. & Singer (1955)
- Galerina subbadipes Huijsman (1955)
- Galerina subbullulifera Singer (1954)
- Galerina subceracea A.H. Sm. & Singer (1955)
- Galerina subcerina A.H. Sm. & Singer (1958)
- Galerina subclavata Kühner (1973)
- Galerina subdecurrens A.H. Sm. (1953)
- Galerina subfiliformis A.H. Sm. (1953)
- Galerina subglabripes A.H. Sm. & Singer (1955)
- Galerina subhypnorum (G.F. Atk.) Singer (1973)
- Galerina subochracea A.H. Sm. (1953)
- Galerina subpapillata Singer (1964)
- Galerina subpumila A.E. Wood (2001)
- Galerina subtibiicystis Singer (1954)
- Galerina subtruncata A.H. Sm. & Singer (1958)
- Galerina subulata A.E. Wood (2001)
- Galerina sulciceps (Berk.) Boedijn (1951)
- Galerina tabacina E. Horak (1988)
- Galerina tahquamenonensis A.H. Sm. (1953)
- Galerina taimbesinhoensis Singer (1954)
- Galerina tatooshiensis A.H. Sm. (1964)
- Galerina tatrensis Singer (1989)
- Galerina tenuissima (Gillet) Singer (1950)
- Galerina terrestris V.L. Wells & Kempton (1969)
- Galerina thujina A.H. Sm. & Singer (1955)
- Galerina tibiicystis (G.F. Atk.) Kühner (1935)
- Galerina tibiiformis A.E. Wood (2001)
- Galerina triscopa (Fr.) Kühner (1935)
- Galerina truncata Natarajan (1977)
- Galerina truncospora A.E. Wood (2001)
- Galerina tsugae A.H. Sm. & Singer (1955)
- Galerina tundrae A.H. Sm. & Singer (1955)
- Galerina turfosa A.H. Sm. & Singer (1955)
- Galerina uchumachiensis Singer (1964)
- Galerina umbrinipes A.H. Sm. (1953)
- Galerina uncialis (Britzelm.) Kühner (1935)
- Galerina ustorum (Berk.) D.A. Reid (1975)
- Galerina vaccinii A.H. Sm. (1953)
- Galerina variibasidia T. Bau & Xiao Liang Liu (2021)
- Galerina velutinoaffinis Singer ex E. Horak (1988)
- Galerina velutipes Singer (1964)
- Galerina venenata A.H. Sm. (1953)
- Galerina vesiculosa A.E. Wood (2001)
- Galerina vexans A.H. Sm. & Singer (1955)
- Galerina vialis A.H. Sm. (1953)
- Galerina viatica Singer (1964)
- Galerina victoriae Singer (1954)
- Galerina vinaceobrunnea A.H. Sm. & Singer (1955)
- Galerina vinolenta (Berk.) A.H. Sm. & Singer (1964)
- Galerina viscida (Peck) A.H. Sm. & Singer (1964)
- Galerina viscidula P.D. Orton (1988)
- Galerina vittiformis (Fr.) Singer (1950)
- Galerina walleyniana A. de Haan (2009)
- Galerina wellsiae A.H. Sm. (1964)
- Galerina wilsonensis A.E. Wood (2001)
- Galerina yungicola Singer (1964)
