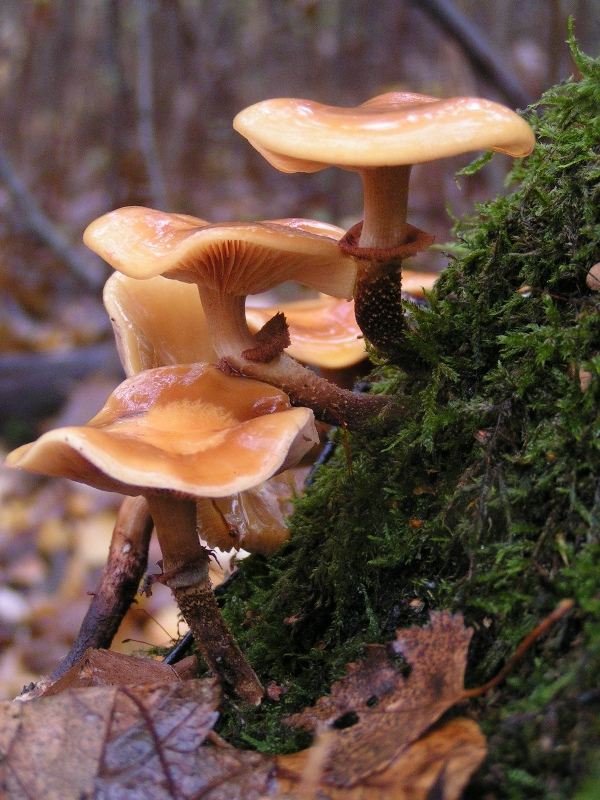
- Kuehneromyces mutabilis

Scientific classification
- Kingdom: Fungi
- Division: Basidiomycota
- Class: Agaricomycetes
- Order: Agaricales
- Family: Strophariaceae
- Genus: Kuehneromyces; Singer & A.H.Sm. (1946)

Type species
- Kuehneromyces mutabilis (Schaeff.) Singer & A.H.Sm. (1946)

Species
- K. brunneoalbescens K. castaneus K. leucolepidotus K. lignicola K. marginellus K. mutabilis K. terrestris K. vernalis

= Kuehneromyces =

Genus of fungi

Kuehneromyces is a genus of agaric fungi in the family Strophariaceae. The genus was circumscribed by mycologists Rolf Singer and Alexander H. Smith in 1946.

The genus name of Kuehneromyces is in honour of Robert Kühner (1903–1996), who was a French mycologist most notable for reviewing many agaric.

The best known species in the genus is K. mutabilis, the sheathed woodtuft, which – despite closely resembling the deadly galerina, Galerina marginata, – is a popular edible mushroom in Europe that can also be cultivated on wood.

== See also ==
- List of Agaricales genera
