= Phaeogalera =

Scientific classification
- Kingdom: Fungi
- Division: Basidiomycota
- Class: Agaricomycetes
- Order: Agaricales
- Family: Strophariaceae
- Genus: Phaeogalera; Kühner (1973)

Type species
- Phaeogalera stagnina (Fr.) Pegler & T.W.K.Young (1975)

Species
- Phaeogalera sphagneti Phaeogalera stagnina

Genus of fungi

Fruit bodies of the agaric fungus Meottomyces dissimulans (Berk. & Broome) Vizzini photographed in Bergamo, Lombardia, Italy.

Phaeogalera is a small genus of slender, fleshy bog and swamp-inhabiting mushrooms with large, brownish spores with a germ pore and a hymenium lacking chrysocystidia. Phaeogalera resemble Galerina in their habitat, macroscopic appearance, and spore print color, however, their microscopic characteristics (smooth spores with a distinct germ pore and non-tibiiform cystidia) more closely resemble Psilocybe. The type species, Phaeogalera stagnina, has an Arctic-alpine distribution in the Northern Hemisphere extending into the boreal forests and taiga. It grows along the edges of bogs in peaty soils and sometimes amongst Sphagnum or other mosses. This type species has been classified in Galerina, Tubaria and Psilocybe. Modern molecular evidence supports the recognition of Phaeogalera as an independent genus separate from Galerina. The generic name is built upon the antiquated generic name "Galera", now synonymous with Galerina, and with a reference to the darker colors of the basidiospores of Phaeogalera. When originally proposed by Kühner, he forgot to fully cite the original publication for the type species which explains by the name was later validly published by Pegler & Young in 1975. The genus Meottomyces was segregated from Phaeogalera after briefly being classified together by Romagnesi (under the name "P. oedipus").
