= Galerina indica =

Scientific classification
- Kingdom: Fungi
- Division: Basidiomycota
- Class: Agaricomycetes
- Order: Agaricales
- Family: Hymenogastraceae
- Genus: Galerina
- Species: G. indica

Binomial name
- Galerina indica K.P.D. Latha & Manim. (2015)

Species of fungus

Galerina indica, also known colloquially as the dark magic mushroom, is a species of agaric fungus in the family Hymenogastraceae, and is bryophilous (grows on moss). It was first described in 2015 from specimens found in Kerala, India, and has since also been found in Florida. It produces small mushrooms with thin stems and a round, olive-green to brown cap about 10 millimetres (0.39 in) wide.

== Toxic and psychoactive properties ==
A study published in 2026 found that it produces both amatoxins (deadly toxins) and psiloids (the class of hallucinogenic compounds of which the best known is psilocybin). It was the first mushroom confirmed to produce both types of chemical, disproving the previously held view that no single species would produce both. The authors proposed the colloquial name "dark magic mushroom" for the species in reference to the combination.

Both classes of chemicals are known from other species of Galerina: Galerina marginata and its close relatives are known to be poisonous, and Galerina steglichii is reported to produce psiloids. Psilocybin production is governed by a set of genes known as the Psi cluster, which is known to be passed between species of fungi by horizontal gene transfer as well as by inheritance. The genes of the Psi cluster appear in the genome of G. indica in a different order than in other species, suggesting that horizontal transfer was the mechanism.

Based on genetic analysis, the 2026 study tentatively suggested that the ancestors of Galerina indica probably evolved toxicity first and acquired the Psi gene cluster later. Both amatoxins and psiloids are thought to be beneficial to the fungus' survival by affecting the animals who consume it – either by discouraging them from eating the mushrooms, or perhaps affecting their behaviour in ways that might e.g. help disperse the mushroom's spores.

The specimens used in the study are now in the collection of the Natural History Museum of Utah.

== See also ==
- List of poisonous mushroom species
- List of psilocybin mushrooms
