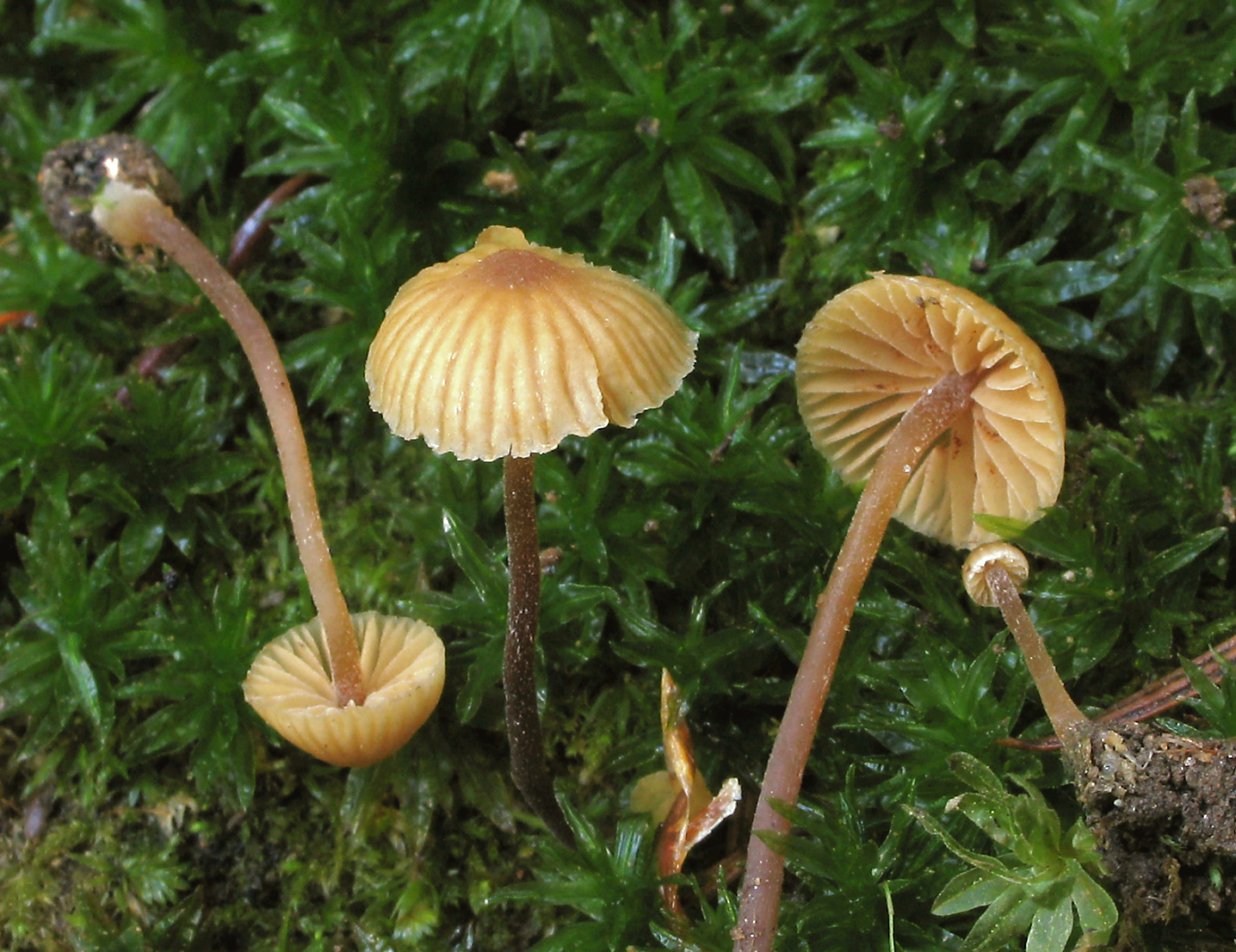

Scientific classification
- Kingdom: Fungi
- Division: Basidiomycota
- Class: Agaricomycetes
- Order: Agaricales
- Family: Hymenogastraceae
- Genus: Galerina
- Species: G. vittiformis

Binomial name
- Galerina vittiformis (Fr.) Singer (1950)

Synonyms
- Agaricus vittiformis Fr. (1838)

= Galerina vittiformis =

Species of fungus

Galerina vittiformis
- Mycological characteristics
- Gills on hymenium
- Cap is convex or conical
- Hymenium is adnate
- Stipe is bare
- Spore print is reddish-brown
- Ecology is saprotrophic
- Edibility is unknown

Galerina vittiformis, also called the hairy leg bell, is a species of agaric fungus in the family Hymenogastraceae, and the type species of the genus Galerina.

== Description ==
Galerina vittiformis has a honey-coloured, striped, hygrophanous cap, up to 1 centimetre (1/2 in) wide. Its shape is bluntly conical becoming broadly convex and even flat with age, often with a prominent umbo. The gills are adnate and tawny to cream coloured, producing a reddish-brown spore print. The stem is up to 5 cm (2 in) long and 2 mm (1/16 in) thick. The stem is equal and pale yellow to chestnut brown, and is initially slightly downy. It has no veil. The flesh is thin and fragile.

Microscopically, its spores measure 10–12.3 x 5–6.5 μm and egg shaped. Its plage is sharply defined, and the spores have an apical callus. Each basidium has 2 spores, and measures 20–24 x 7–8 μm. They are colorless in KOH. The pleurocystidia and cheilocystidia measure 56–74 x 10–16 μm, and are abundant to scattered. They are thin, and fusoid-ventricose with an acute or rounded tip. They are also colorless in KOH.

=== Similar species ===
It resembles other members of its genus such as G. hypnorum, G. pumila, and G. semilanceata.

== Habitat and distribution ==
It is widely distributed in temperate regions, where it typically grows in moist locations, often among mosses. The fungus has been shown to bioaccumulate various heavy metals from contaminated soil.

In North America, it can generally be found from June to September, or somewhat later on the West Coast where it is more common.
