= Gro Gulden =

Norwegian mycologist

Gro Sissel Gulden (born 30 October 1939) is a Norwegian mycologist.

She was hired as a curator at the Natural History Museum at the University of Oslo in 1967, and was promoted to professor in 2001. She retired in the autumn of 2006. A replacement curator has not been found as of early 2009. Gulden has published several books, both academic, popular and for children. Her research has been focused largely on the taxonomy of agaric mushrooms, especially the family Tricholomataceae and the genus Galerina. She also has published several articles about alpine and arctic macromycetes.

== Selected works ==
- Gulden G, Ahmed N, Zeitlin M, Super CM, Klein RE, Ahmad K (1988). "Behavioural factors in diarrhoeal illness among Bangladeshi infants". Journal of Tropical Pediatrics. 34 (6): 331–2. doi:10.1093/tropej/34.6.331. PMID 3221420.
- Jenssen KM, Gulden G (1988). Arctic and Alpine Fungi. Lubrecht & Cramer Ltd. ISBN 82-991301-1-5.
- Gulden G, Stensrud O, Shalchian-Tabrizi K, Kauserud H (2005). "Galerina Earle: A polyphyletic genus in the consortium of dark-spored agarics". Mycologia. 97 (4): 823–37. doi:10.3852/mycologia.97.4.823. PMID 16457352.
- Noordeloos ME, Gulden G., Machiel E.; Gulden, Gro (1989). "Entoloma (Basidiomycetes, Agaricales) of alpine habitats on the Hardangervidda near Finse, Norway, with a key including species from Northern Europe and Greenland". Canadian Journal of Botany. 67 (6): 1727–38. Bibcode:1989CaJB...67.1727N. doi:10.1139/b89-219.
