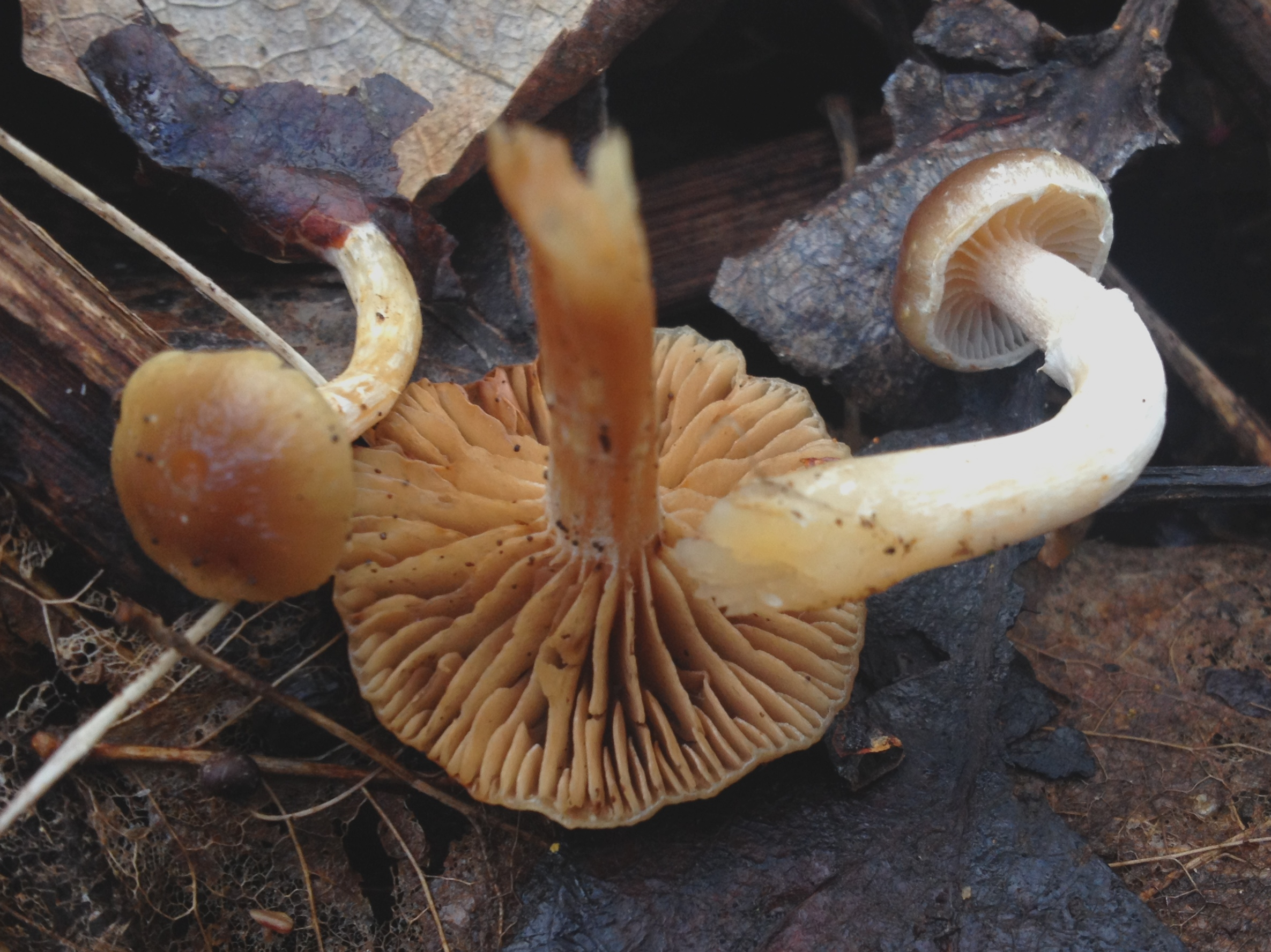

Scientific classification
- Kingdom: Fungi
- Division: Basidiomycota
- Class: Agaricomycetes
- Order: Agaricales
- Family: incertae sedis
- Genus: Meottomyces; Vizzini (2008)

Type species
- Meottomyces dissimulans (Berk. & Br.) Vizzini (2008)

= Meottomyces =

Genus of fungi

Meottomyces is a small genus of relatively nondescript, fleshy, brown mushrooms related to Tubaria. In older classifications it had been included in Pholiota, Phaeogalera, or Hemipholiota. Modern molecular evidence suggested recognition of a separate genus when sequences of a collection first identified as Pholiota oedipus, now reclassified in Meottomyces, revealed a unique branch. Subsequently, that species was studied by Holec and later as Phaeogalera oedipus was shown to be distinct from Tubaria but not the type of Phaeogalera itself. Additional phylogenetic support was provided by Gitte Petersen and others, who clearly showed a separation from Phaeogalera. The genus was erected by Vizzini, for two species and two varieties, all former members of Pholiota. Vizzini treated the name Pholiota oedipus as a misapplied name, but this was contested by Legon, who provided detailed notes on the types and ecology of the type species.

The genus is named after an Italian mycologist, Francesco Meotto, who studies ectomycorrhizal fungi.
