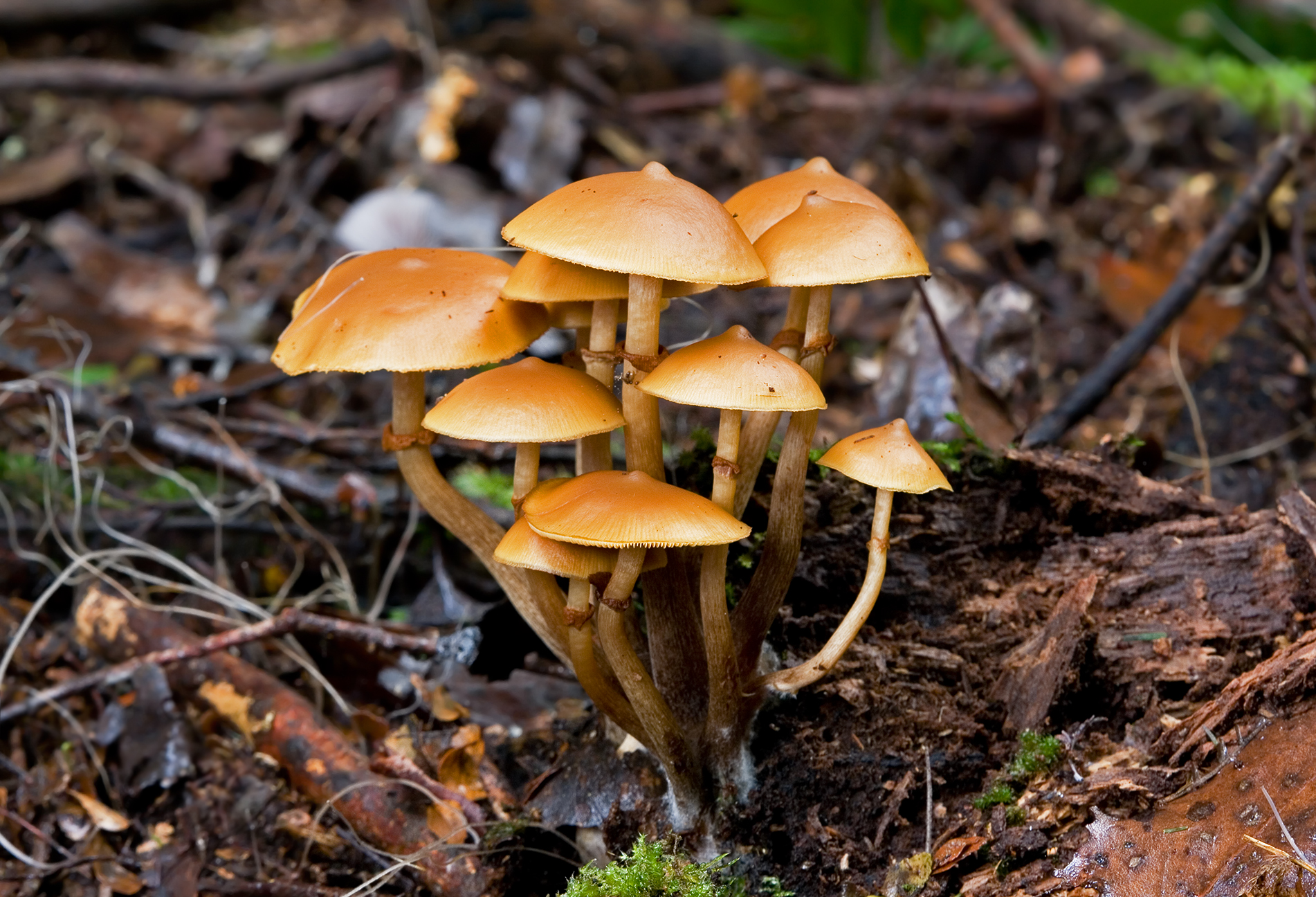

Scientific classification
- Kingdom: Fungi
- Division: Basidiomycota
- Class: Agaricomycetes
- Order: Agaricales
- Family: Hymenogastraceae
- Genus: Galerina
- Species: G. patagonica

Binomial name
- Galerina patagonica Singer (1954)

= Galerina patagonica =

Species of fungus

Galerina patagonica is a species of agaric fungus in the family Hymenogastraceae. First described by mycologist Rolf Singer in 1953, it has a Gondwanan distribution, and is found in Australia, New Zealand, and Patagonia (South America), where it grows on rotting wood.

The fungus contains a laccase enzyme that has been investigated for possible used in bioremediation of chlorophenol-polluted environments.

The toxicity of Galerina patagonica is unknown. However, it is phylogenetically nested within the Galerina marginata species complex, and thus likely contains deadly amatoxins.
