= Galerina calyptrata =

Scientific classification
- Kingdom: Fungi
- Division: Basidiomycota
- Class: Agaricomycetes
- Order: Agaricales
- Family: Hymenogastraceae
- Genus: Galerina
- Species: G. calyptrata

Binomial name
- Galerina calyptrata P.D. Orton, 1960

Synonyms
- Galerina cerina var. calyptrata (P. D. Orton) Arnolds, 1982

Species of fungus

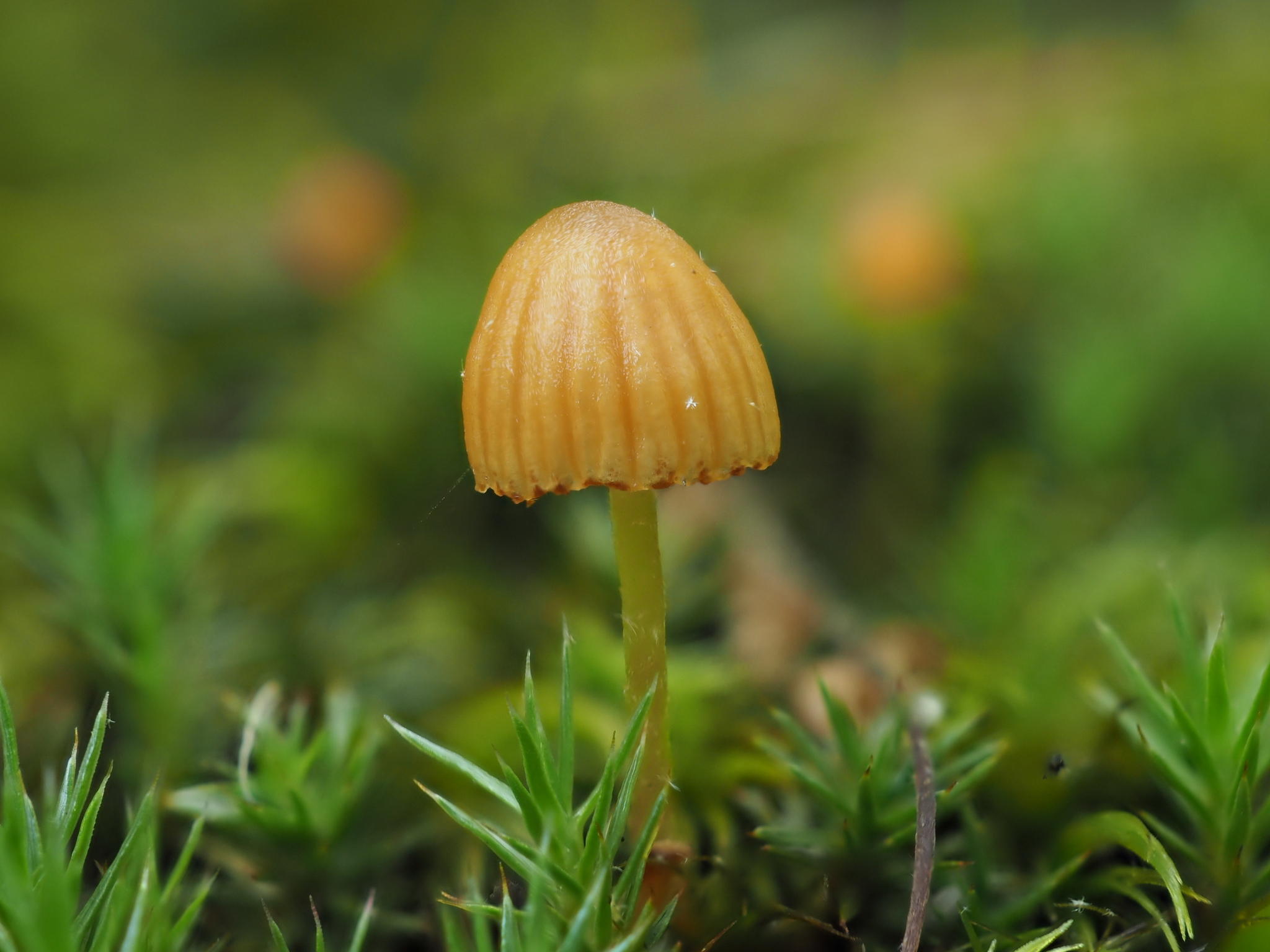
Hooded bell, Rockland County, US-NY, US

Galerina calyptrata, also known as the tiny bog Galerina, is a species of fungus belonging in the family Cortinariaceae. It occurs throughout much of the world, but has not been reported in North America.

== Description ==
G. calyptrata is very small in size, with a cap ranging from 0.3–0.8 cm (0.12–0.31 in) in diameter and a brown-yellow translucent stem from 3–5 cm (1.2–2.0 in) in height and 1–2 mm (0.039–0.079 in) in width. The cap is brown, has distinct striations, and turns lighter when it dries out. Lamellas are brown, adnate, and widely spaced. Usually, this species of mushroom grows in or near patches of moss in moist environments. It smells of yeast and has pale brown flesh. To identify it from other species requires microscopic observation of spore pattern. Spores are of an ocher-brown color, warty, spindle-shaped, and have a loosening outer wall.
