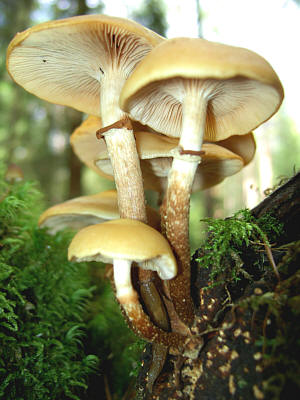
- K. mutabilis in a dry state

Scientific classification
- Domain: Eukaryota
- Kingdom: Fungi
- Division: Basidiomycota
- Class: Agaricomycetes
- Order: Agaricales
- Family: Strophariaceae
- Genus: Kuehneromyces
- Species: K. mutabilis

Binomial name
- Kuehneromyces mutabilis (Schaeff.) Singer & A.H.Sm. (1946)

Synonyms
- Pholiota mutabilis (Schaeff.) P.Kumm. (1871); Dryophila mutabilis (Schaeff.) Quél. (1886); Galerina mutabilis (Schaeff.) P.D.Orton (1960)

= Kuehneromyces mutabilis =

Kuehneromyces mutabilis Mycological characteristics
- Gills on hymenium
- Cap is convex
- Hymenium is adnexed
- Stipe has a ring
- Spore print is brown
- Ecology is saprotrophic
- Edibility is choice but not recommended

Kuehneromyces mutabilis (synonym: Pholiota mutabilis), commonly known as the sheathed woodtuft, is a species of fungus that grows in clumps on dead wood. It is edible but strongly resembles the deadly poisonous Galerina marginata.

== Description ==
The clustered shiny convex caps grow up to 8 centimetres (3 1/4 in) in diameter. They are very hygrophanous; in a damp state they are shiny and greasy with a deep orange-brown colour towards the rim; often there is a disc of lighter (less sodden) flesh in the middle. In a dry state they are cinnamon-coloured.

The gills are initially light then brown and are sometimes somewhat decurrent. The spore print is rusty brown.

The stipe is 4–9 cm long and under 1 cm in diameter with a ring which separates the bare, smooth light cinnamon upper part from the darker brown shaggily scaly lower part. This type of stem is sometimes described as "booted".

=== Similar species ===
It resembles the deadly poisonous Galerina marginata. Although a typical K. mutabilis is easily distinguished from a typical G. marginata by the "booted" stipe which is shaggy below the ring, this character is not reliable and G. marginata can also have scales. The main differences are:

- While they are both hygrophanous, K. mutabilis dries from the centre outwards (so having a lighter colour in the centre) and G. marginata dries from the edge inwards.
- the stem below the ring is scaly below the ring in K. mutabilis, but normally fibrously silky in G. marginata.
- K. mutabilis has a pleasant mushroom smell and mild taste, whereas G. marginata tastes and smells mealy.

Also similar are K. lignicola, K. marginellus, Pholiota angustipes and P. terrestris.

== Distribution and habitat ==
Kuehneromyces mutabilis is found in North America, Australia, Asia (in the Caucuses, Siberia, and Japan), and Europe. In Europe, it can be found from Southern Europe to Iceland and Scandinavia.

This species always grows on wood, generally on stumps of broad-leaved trees (especially beech, birch and alder), and rarely on conifers.

It is found from April to late October, and also in the remaining winter months where conditions are mild. It is often seen at times when there are few other fungi in evidence.

== Edibility ==
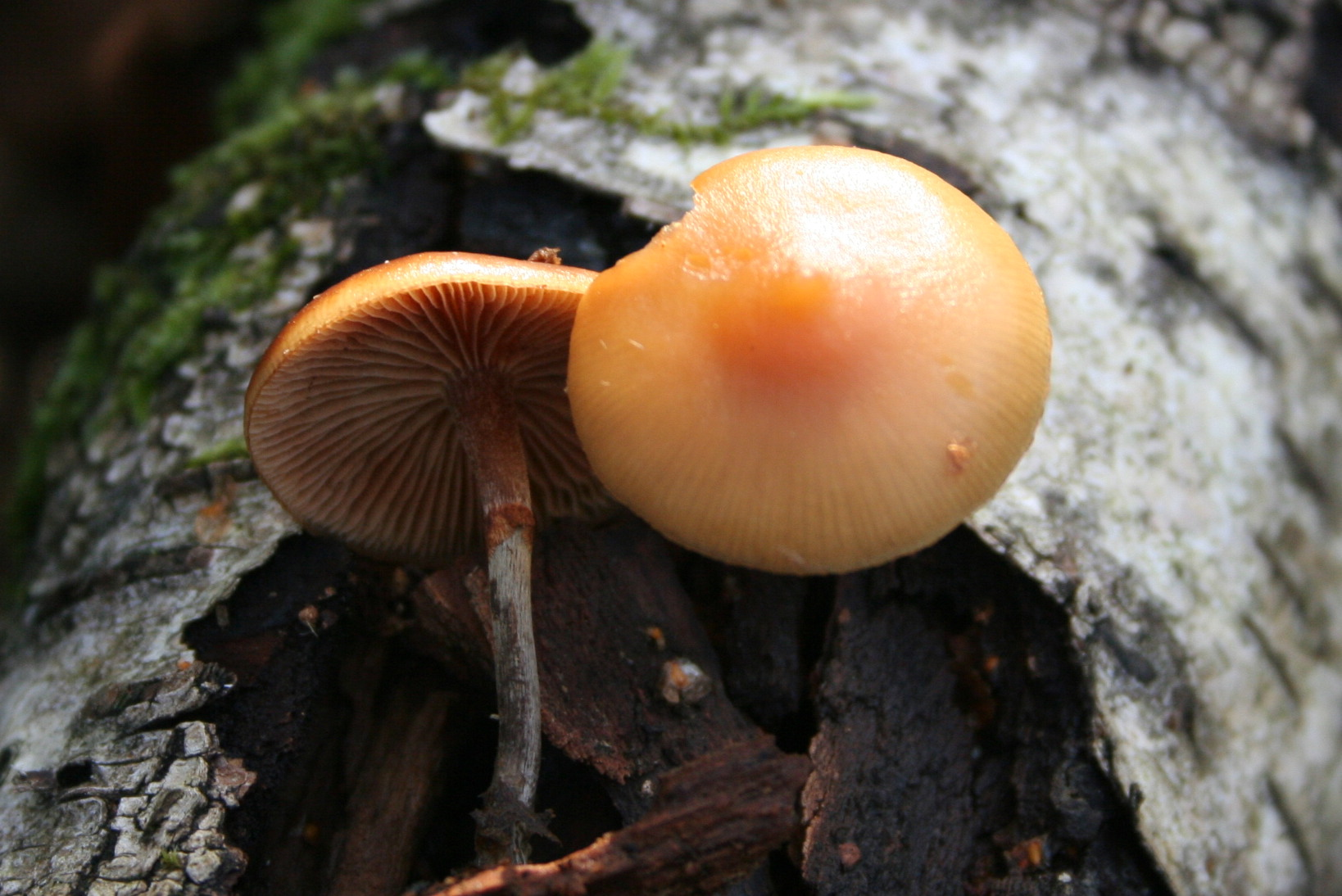
Galerina marginata (potentially fatal)

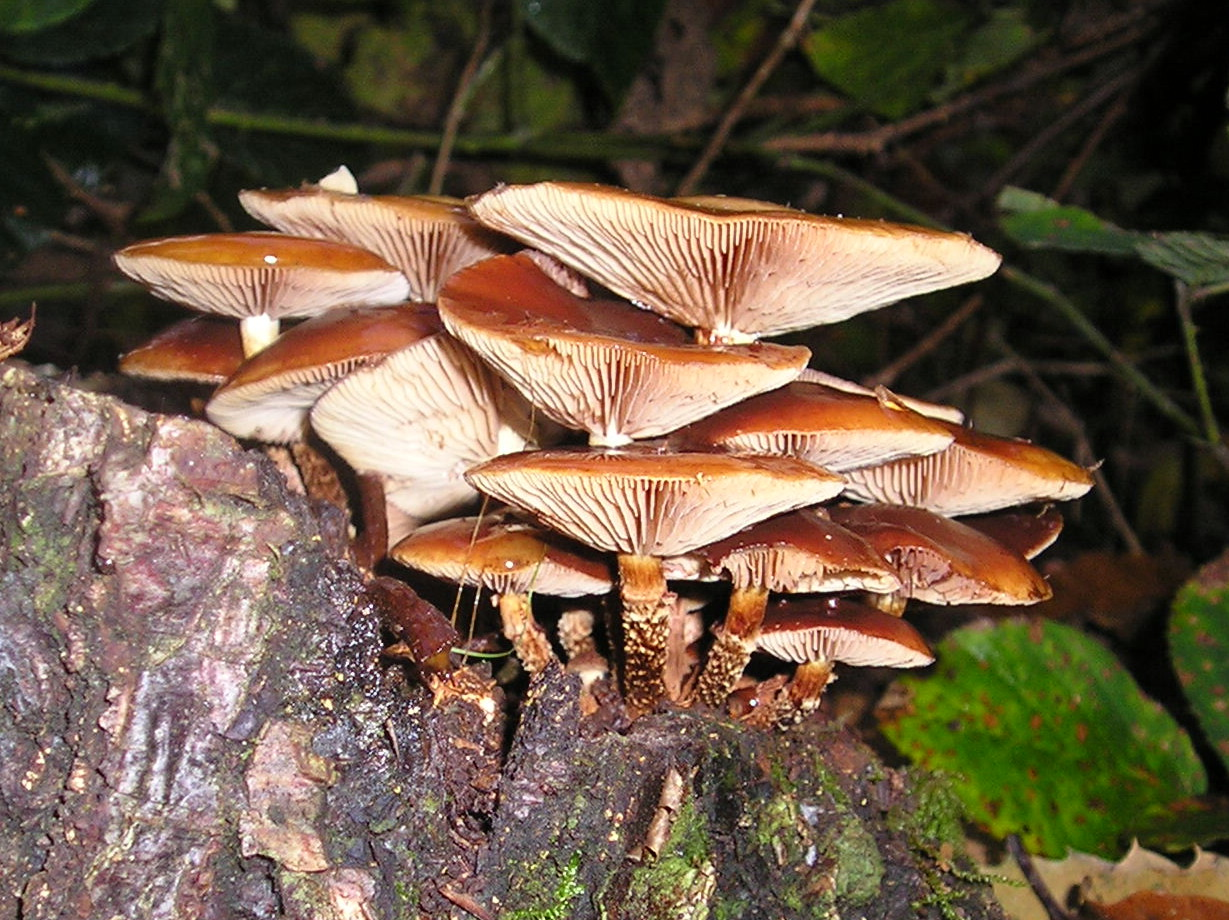
Kuehneromyces mutabilis (good edible)

Some guides caution that K. mutabilis is not safe to consume as it could be confused with the deadly poisonous Galerina marginata, even by people who are quite knowledgeable.

The caps of this mushroom can be fried or used for flavouring in sauces and soups (the stems being too tough to eat). The flavour is best after cooking.
