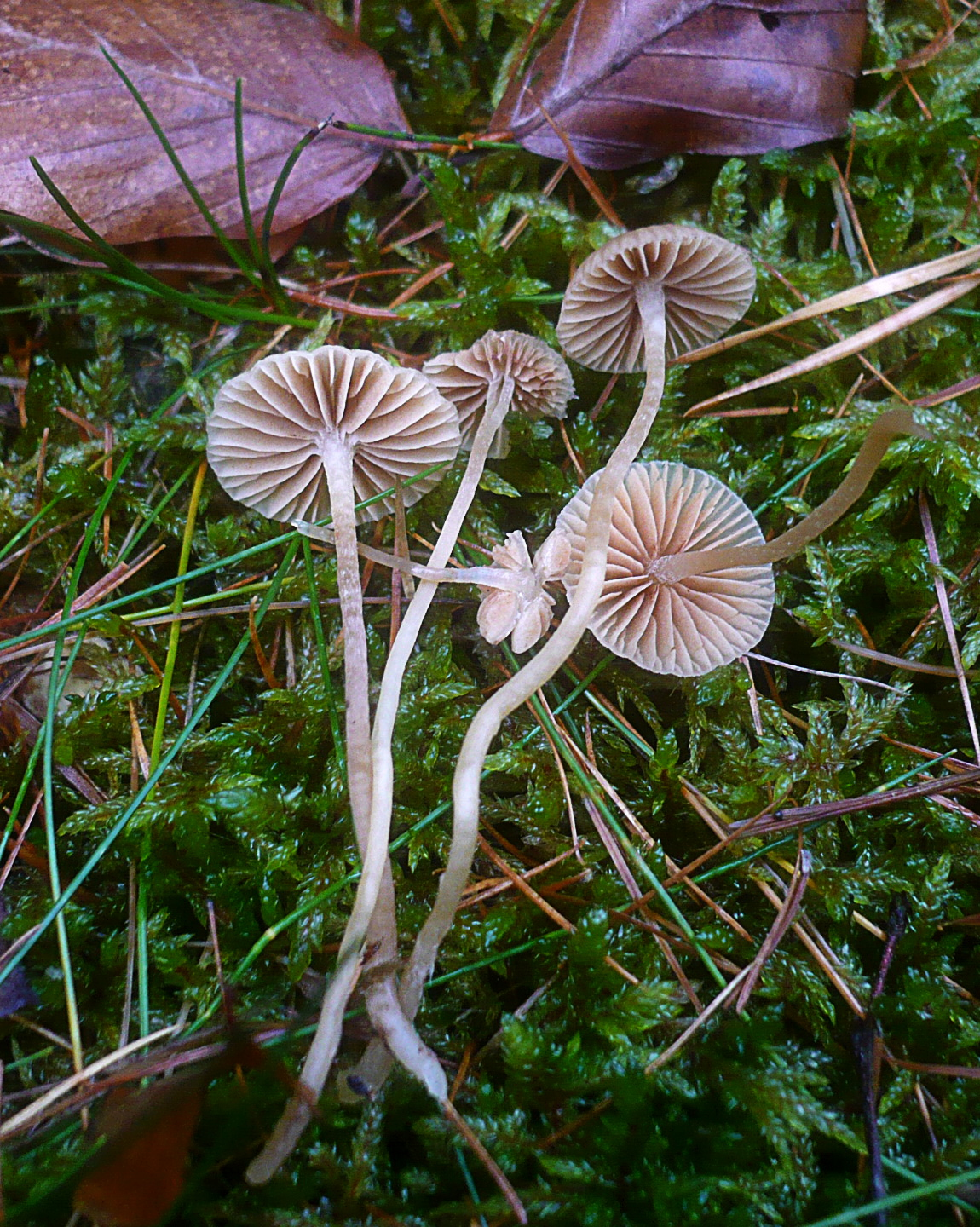

Scientific classification
- Domain: Eukaryota
- Kingdom: Fungi
- Division: Basidiomycota
- Class: Agaricomycetes
- Order: Agaricales
- Family: Hymenogastraceae
- Genus: Galerina
- Species: G. graminea

Binomial name
- Galerina graminea (Velen.) Kühner

Synonyms
- Galera graminea Velen. České Houby (Praze) 3: 548 (1921); Agaricus laevis Pers. Mycol. eur. (Erlanga) 3: 164 (1828); Galerina laevis Singer. Persoonia 2(1): 31 (1961); Galera laevis (Singer.) Malençon & Bertault Champignon Supérieurs du Maroc 1: 556 (1970); Galera laevis var. glabrata Malençon & Bertault Champignon Supérieurs du Maroc 1: 556 (1970)

= Galerina graminea =

Species of fungus

Galerina graminea, known as the turf bell is a species of mushroom in the genus Galerina. Unlike many Galerina mushrooms, it can survive in moss-free grass. It was known for many years as 'Galerina laevis', proposed by Christiaan Hendrik Persoon. Galerina means helmet-like, while graminea means "of grass". It is not known whether it is poisonous or not; however, it is suspected to be.
