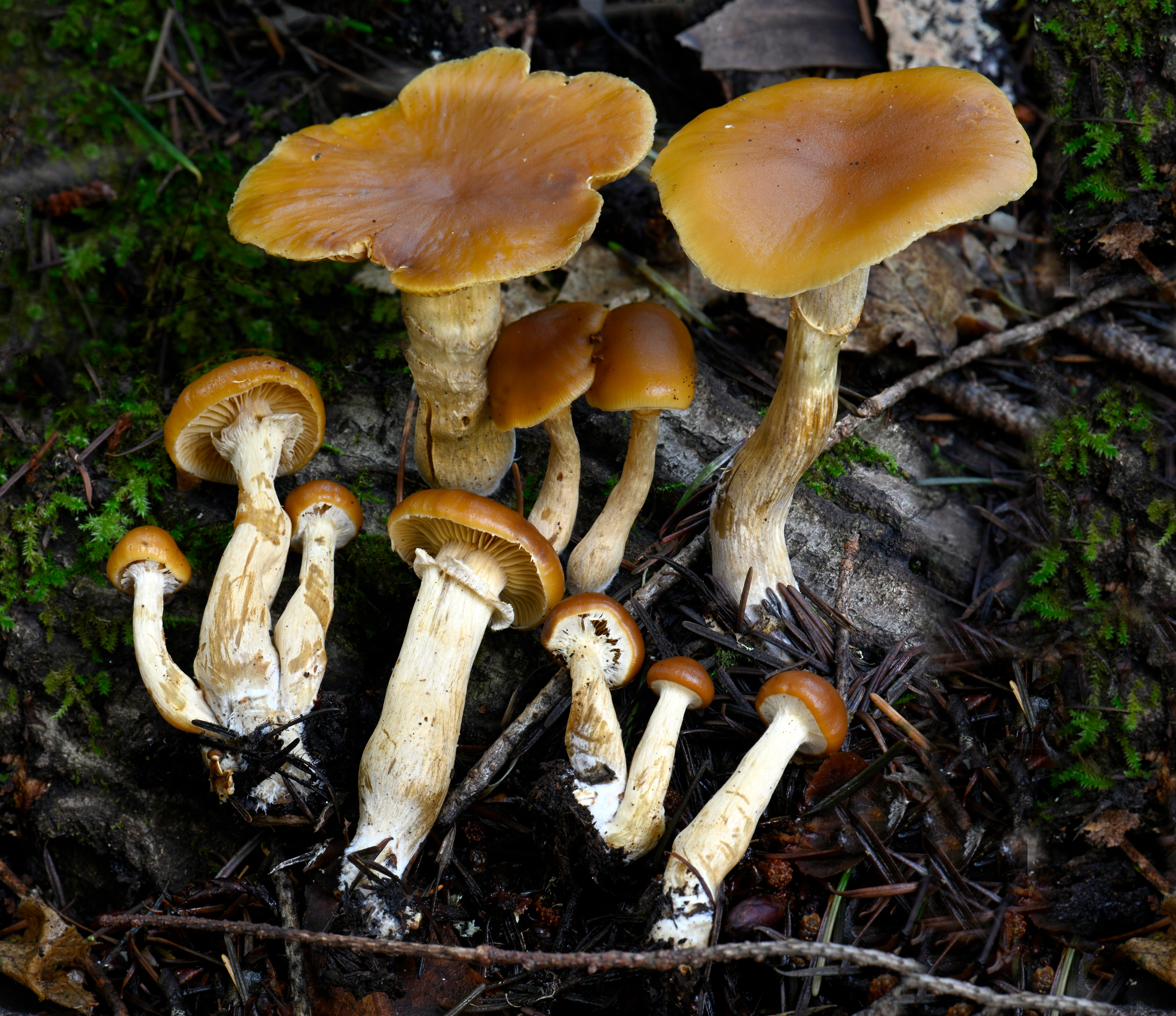

Scientific classification
- Kingdom: Fungi
- Division: Basidiomycota
- Class: Agaricomycetes
- Order: Agaricales
- Family: Hymenogastraceae
- Genus: Galerina
- Species: G. marginata

Binomial name
- Galerina marginata (Batsch) Kühner (1935)

Synonyms
- Agaricus marginatus Batsch (1789); Agaricus unicolor Vahl (1792); Agaricus autumnalis Peck (1872); Pholiota marginata (Batsch) Quél. (1872); Pholiota discolor Peck (1873); Galerina unicolor (Vahl) Singer (1936); Galerina venenata (Vahl) Singer (1953); Galerina autumnalis (Peck) A.H.Sm. & Singer (1964); Galerina oregonensis A.H.Sm. (1964)

= Galerina marginata =

Poisonous fungus in the family Hymenogastraceae

Galerina marginata
- Mycological characteristics
- Gills on hymenium
- Cap is convex
- Hymenium is adnexed or adnate
- Stipe has a ring or is bare
- Spore print is brown
- Ecology is saprotrophic
- Edibility is deadly

Galerina marginata, known colloquially as funeral bell, deadly skullcap, autumn skullcap or deadly galerina, is a species of extremely poisonous mushroom-forming fungus in the family Hymenogastraceae of the order Agaricales. Before 2001, the species G. autumnalis, G. oregonensis, G. unicolor, and G. venenata were thought to be distinct from G. marginata due to differences in habitat and the viscidity of their caps, but phylogenetic analysis showed that they are all the same species. Other closely related species that are also extremely poisonous are G. helvoliceps and G. fasciculata from Eastern Asia, G. patagonica from Australia, New Zealand and Argentina, and G. sulciceps from tropical localities.

The fruit bodies of the mushroom have brown to yellow-brown caps that fade in color when drying. The gills are brownish and give a rusty spore print. A well-defined membranous ring is typically seen on the stems of young specimens but often disappears with age. In older fruit bodies, the caps are flatter and the gills and stems browner. The species is a classic "little brown mushroom" – a catchall category that includes all small to medium-sized, indistinguishable brownish mushrooms – and thus can easily be misidentified.

G. marginata is a wood-rotting fungus that grows predominantly on decaying conifer wood. It is widespread in the Northern Hemisphere, including Eurasia and North America, and has also been found in Australia. It contains the same deadly amatoxins found in the death cap (Amanita phalloides). Ingestion in toxic amounts causes severe liver damage with vomiting, diarrhea, hypothermia, and eventual death if not treated rapidly. About ten poisonings have been attributed to the species during the 20th century.

== Taxonomy ==
What is now recognized as a single morphologically variable taxon named Galerina marginata was once split into five distinct species. Norwegian mycologist Gro Gulden and colleagues concluded that all five represented the same species after comparing the DNA sequences of the internal transcribed spacer region of ribosomal DNA for various North American and European specimens in Galerina section Naucoriopsis. The results showed no genetic differences between G. marginata and G. autumnalis, G. oregonensis, G. unicolor, and G. venenata, thus reducing all these names to synonymy. The oldest of these names are Agaricus marginatus, described by August Batsch in 1789, and Agaricus unicolor, described by Martin Vahl in 1792. Agaricus autumnalis was described by Charles Horton Peck in 1873, and later moved to Galerina by A. H. Smith and Rolf Singer in their 1962 worldwide monograph on that genus. In the same publication they also introduced the G. autumnalis varieties robusta and angusticystis. Another of the synonymous species, G. oregonensis, was first described in that monograph. Galerina venenata was first identified as a species by Smith in 1953. Since Agaricus marginatus is the oldest validly published name, it has priority according to the rules of botanical nomenclature.

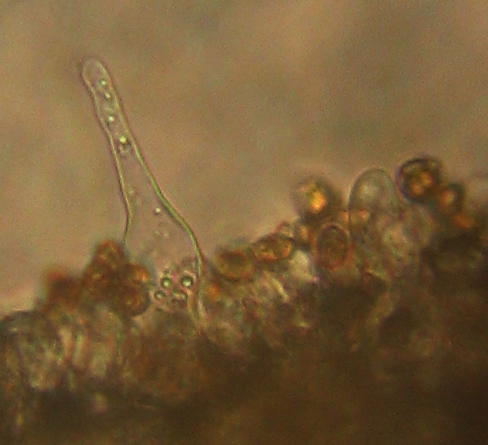
Acute-ended cystidia are characteristic of Galerina species in the section Naucoriopsis.

Another species analysed in Gulden's 2001 study, Galerina pseudomycenopsis, also could not be distinguished from G. marginata based on ribosomal DNA sequences and restriction fragment length polymorphism analyses. Because of differences in ecology, fruit body color and spore size combined with inadequate sampling, the authors preferred to maintain G. pseudomycenopsis as a distinct species. A 2005 study again failed to separate the two species using molecular methods, but reported that the incompatibility demonstrated in mating experiments suggests that the species are distinct.

In the fourth edition (1986) of Singer's comprehensive classification of the Agaricales, G. marginata is the type species of Galerina section Naucoriopsis, a subdivision first defined by French mycologist Robert Kühner in 1935. It includes small brown-spored mushrooms characterized by cap edges initially curved inwards, fruit bodies resembling Pholiota or Naucoria and thin-walled, obtuse or acute-ended pleurocystidia that are not rounded at the top. Within this section, G. autumnalis and G. oregonensis are in stirps Autumnalis, while G. unicolor, G. marginata, and G. venenata are in stirps Marginata. Autumnalis species are characterized by having a viscid to lubricous cap surface while Marginata species lack a gelatinous cap—the surface is moist, "fatty-shining", or matte when wet. However, as Gulden explains, this characteristic is highly variable: "Viscidity is a notoriously difficult character to assess because it varies with the age of the fruitbody and the weather conditions during its development. Varying degrees of viscidity tend to be described differently and applied inconsistently by different persons applying terms such as lubricous, fatty, fatty-shiny, sticky, viscid, glutinous, or (somewhat) slimy."

The specific epithet marginata is derived from the Latin word for "margin" or "edge", while autumnalis means "of the autumn". Common names of the species include the "marginate Pholiota" (resulting from its synonymy with Pholiota marginata), "funeral bell", "deadly skullcap", and "deadly Galerina". G. autumnalis was known as the "fall Galerina" or the "autumnal Galerina", while G. venenata was the "deadly lawn Galerina".

== Description ==
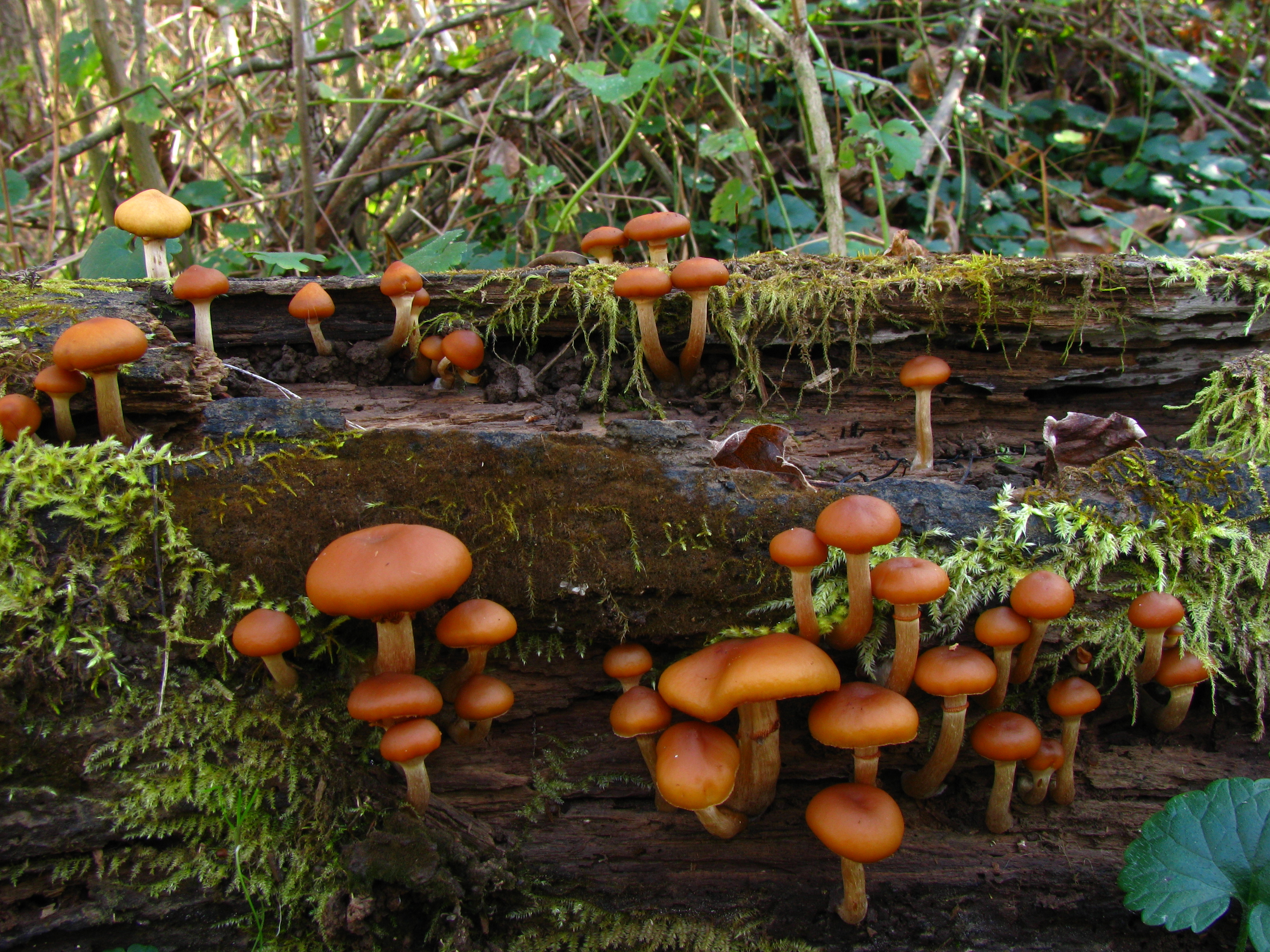
Young fruit bodies have margins rolled inwards.

The cap ranges from 1 to 6 centimetres (1/2 to 2 1/4 in) in diameter. It starts convex, sometimes broadly conical, and has edges (margins) that are curved in against the gills. As the cap grows and expands, it becomes broadly convex and then flattened, sometimes developing a central elevation, or umbo, which may project prominently from the cap surface.

Based on the collective descriptions of the five taxa now considered to be G. marginata, the texture of the surface shows significant variation. Smith and Singer give the following descriptions of surface texture: from "viscid" (G. autumnalis), to "shining and viscid to lubricous when moist" (G. oregonensis), to "shining, lubricous to subviscid (particles of dirt adhere to surface) or merely moist, with a fatty appearance although not distinctly viscid", to "moist but not viscid" (G. marginata). The cap surface remains smooth and changes colors with humidity (hygrophanous), pale to dark ochraceous tawny over the disc and yellow-ochraceous on the margin (at least when young), but fading to dull tan or darker when dry. When moist, the cap is somewhat transparent so that the outlines of the gills may be seen as striations. The flesh is pale brownish ochraceous to nearly white, thin and pliant, with an odor and taste varying from very slightly to strongly like flour (farinaceous).

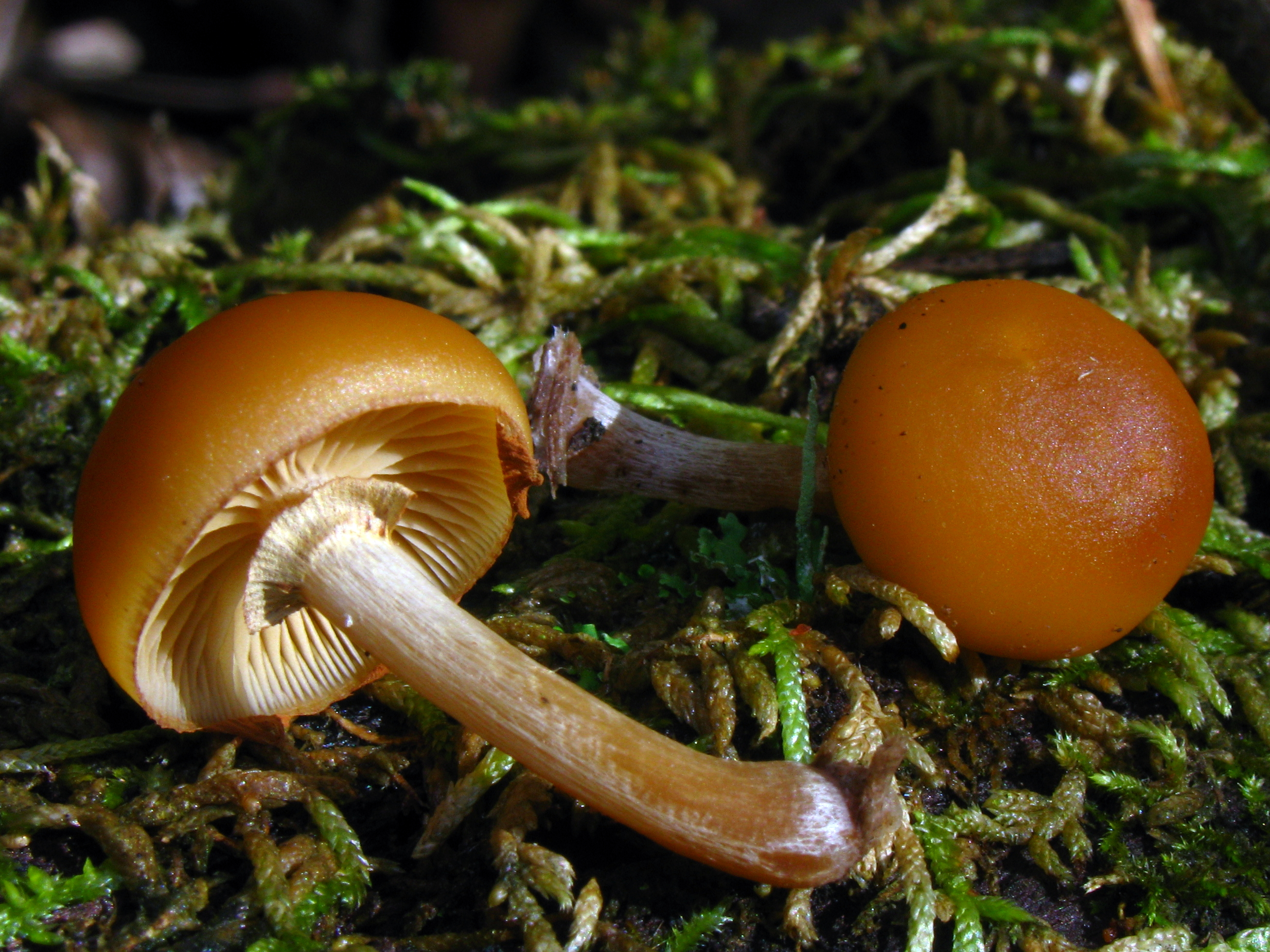
View of gills and stem

The gills are typically narrow and crowded together, with a broadly adnate to nearly decurrent attachment to the stem and convex edges. They are a pallid brown when young, becoming tawny at maturity. Some short gills, called lamellulae, do not extend entirely from the cap edge to the stem, and are intercalated among the longer gills. The stem ranges from 2 to 8 cm (3/4 to 3 1/8 in) long, 3–9 mm thick at the apex, and stays equal in width throughout or is slightly enlarged downward. Initially solid, it becomes hollow from the bottom up as it matures. The membranous ring is located on the upper half of the stem near the cap, but may be sloughed off and missing in older specimens. Its color is initially whitish or light brown, but usually appears a darker rusty-brown in mature specimens that have dropped spores on it. Above the level of the ring, the stem surface has a very fine whitish powder and is paler than the cap; below the ring it is brown down to the reddish-brown to bistre base. The lower portion of the stem has a thin coating of pallid fibrils which eventually disappear and do not leave any scales. The spore print is rusty-brown.

=== Microscopic characteristics ===
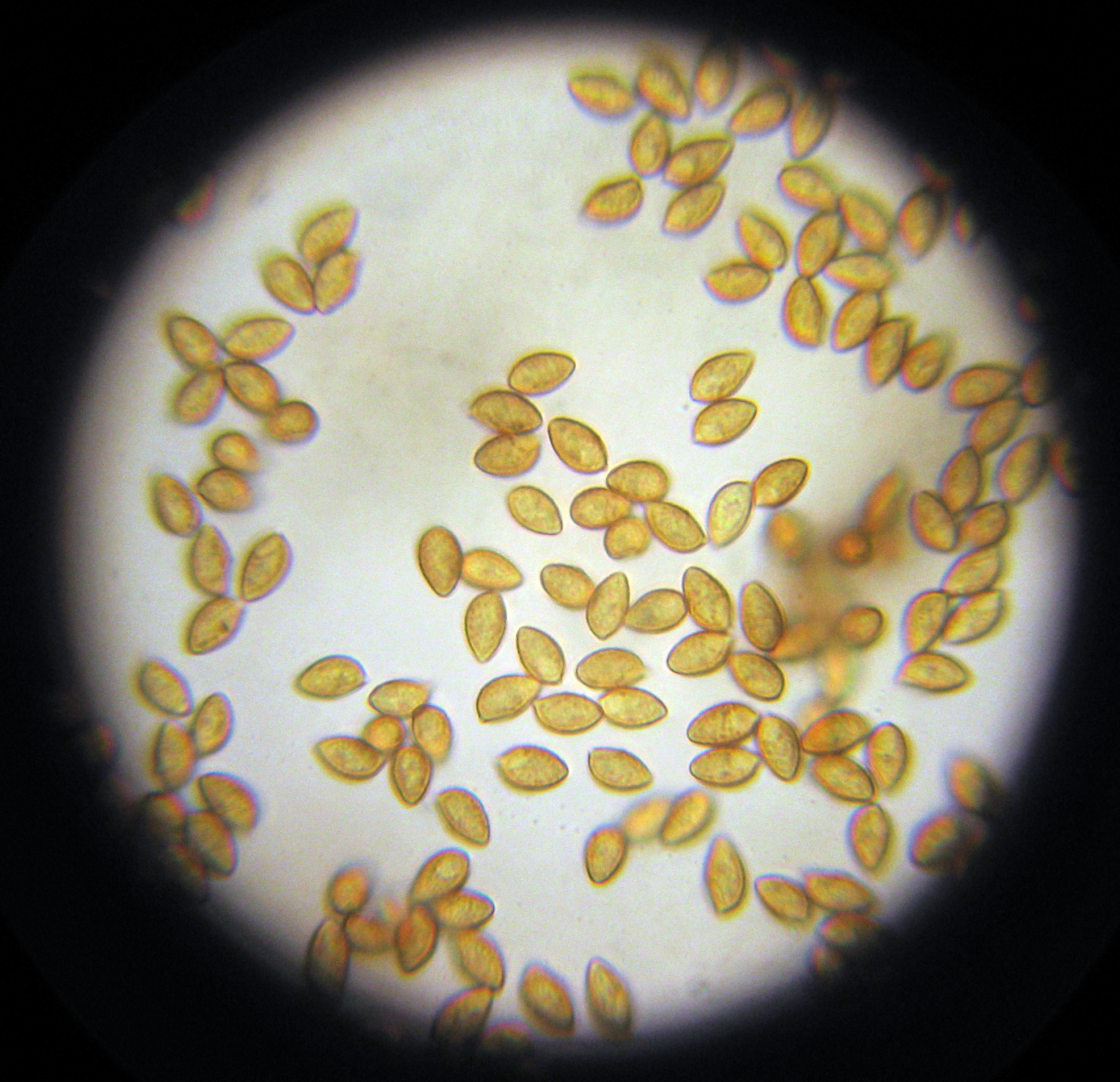
Spores, 1000x magnification

The spores measure 8–10 by 5–6 μm, and are slightly inequilateral in profile view, and egg-shaped in face view. Like all Galerina species, the spores have a plage, which has been described as resembling "a slightly wrinkled plastic shrink-wrap covering over the distal end of the spore". The spore surface is warty and full of wrinkles, with a smooth depression where the spore was once attached via the sterigmatum to the basidium (the spore-bearing cell). When in potassium hydroxide (KOH) solution, the spores appear tawny or darker rusty-brown, with an apical callus. The basidia are four-spored (rarely with a very few two-spored ones), roughly cylindrical when producing spores, but with a slightly tapered base, and measure 21–29 by 5–8.4 μm.

Cystidia are cells of the fertile hymenium that do not produce spores. These sterile cells, which are structurally distinct from the basidia, are further classified according to their position. In G. marginata, the pleurocystidia (cystidia from the gill sides) are 46–60 by 9–12 μm, thin-walled, and hyaline in KOH, fusoid to ventricose in shape with wavy necks and blunt to subacute apices (3–6 μm diameter near apex). The cheilocystidia (cystidia on the gill edges) are similar in shape but often smaller than the pleurocystidia, abundant, with no club-shaped or abruptly tapering (mucronate) cells present. Clamp connections are present in the hyphae.

=== Similar species ===
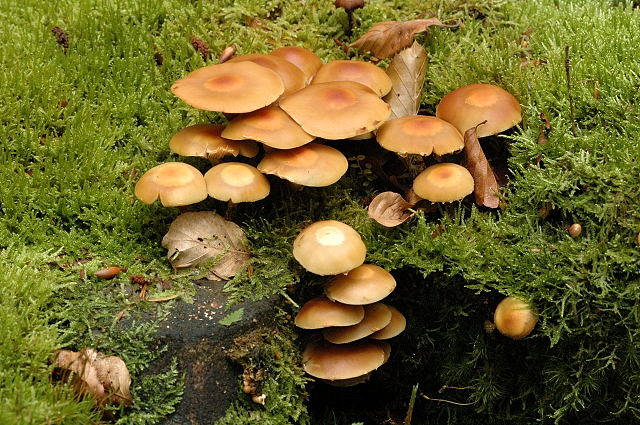
Kuehneromyces mutabilis is one of several edible lookalike species.

The deadly G. marginata may be mistaken for a few edible mushroom species such as Armillaria mellea, Psilocybe cyanescens and Kuehneromyces mutabilis. K. mutabilis (syn. Pholiota mutabilis) produces fruit bodies roughly similar in appearance and also grows on wood, but may be distinguished by its stems bearing scales up to the level of the ring, and from growing in large clusters. However, the possibility of confusion is such that K. mutabilis is not recommended for consumption without expert and extremely certain identification. Microscopic examination shows smooth spores in Pholiota. K. mutabilis may be distinguished by the presence of scales on the stem below the ring, the larger cap, which may reach a diameter of 6 cm (2 3/8 in), and spicy or aromatic odor of the flesh. The related K. vernalis is a rare species and even more similar in appearance to G. marginata. Examination of microscopic characteristics is typically required to reliably distinguish between the two, revealing smooth spores with a germ pore.

Another potential edible lookalike is the "velvet shank", Flammulina velutipes. This species has gills that are white to pale yellow, a white spore print, and spores that are elliptical, smooth, and measure 6.5–9 by 2.5–4 μm. A rough resemblance has also been noted with the edible Hypholoma capnoides, the 'magic' mushroom Psilocybe subaeruginosa, as well as Conocybe filaris, another poisonous amatoxin-containing species.

== Habitat and distribution ==
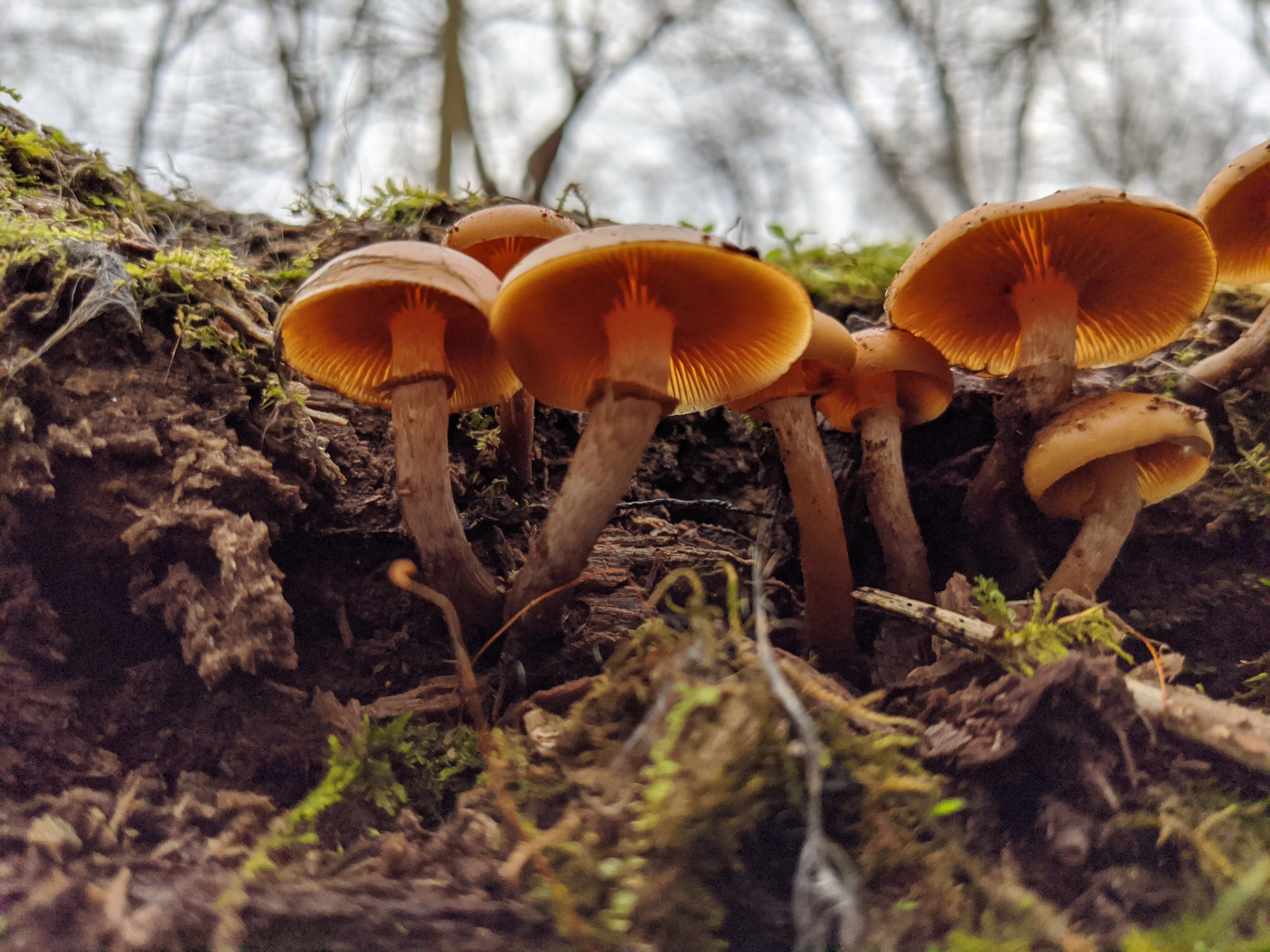
Galerina marginata growing on decayed log

Galerina marginata is a saprobic fungus, obtaining nutrients by breaking down organic matter. It is known to have most of the major classes of secreted enzymes that dissolve plant cell wall polysaccharides, and has been used as a model saprobe in recent studies of ectomycorrhizal fungi. Because of its variety of enzymes capable of breaking down wood and other lignocellulosic materials, the Department of Energy Joint Genome Institute (JGI) is currently sequencing its genome. The fungus is typically reported to grow on or near the wood of conifers, although it has been observed to grow on hardwoods as well. Fruit bodies may grow solitarily, but more typically in groups or small clusters, and appear in the summer to autumn. Sometimes, they may grow on buried wood and thus appear to be growing on soil.

Galerina marginata is widely distributed throughout the Northern Hemisphere, found in North America, Europe, Japan, Iran, continental Asia, and the Caucasus. In North America, it has been collected as far north as the boreal forest of Canada and subarctic and arctic habitats in Labrador, and south to Jalisco, Mexico. It is also found in Australia, and in Antarctica.

== Toxicity ==
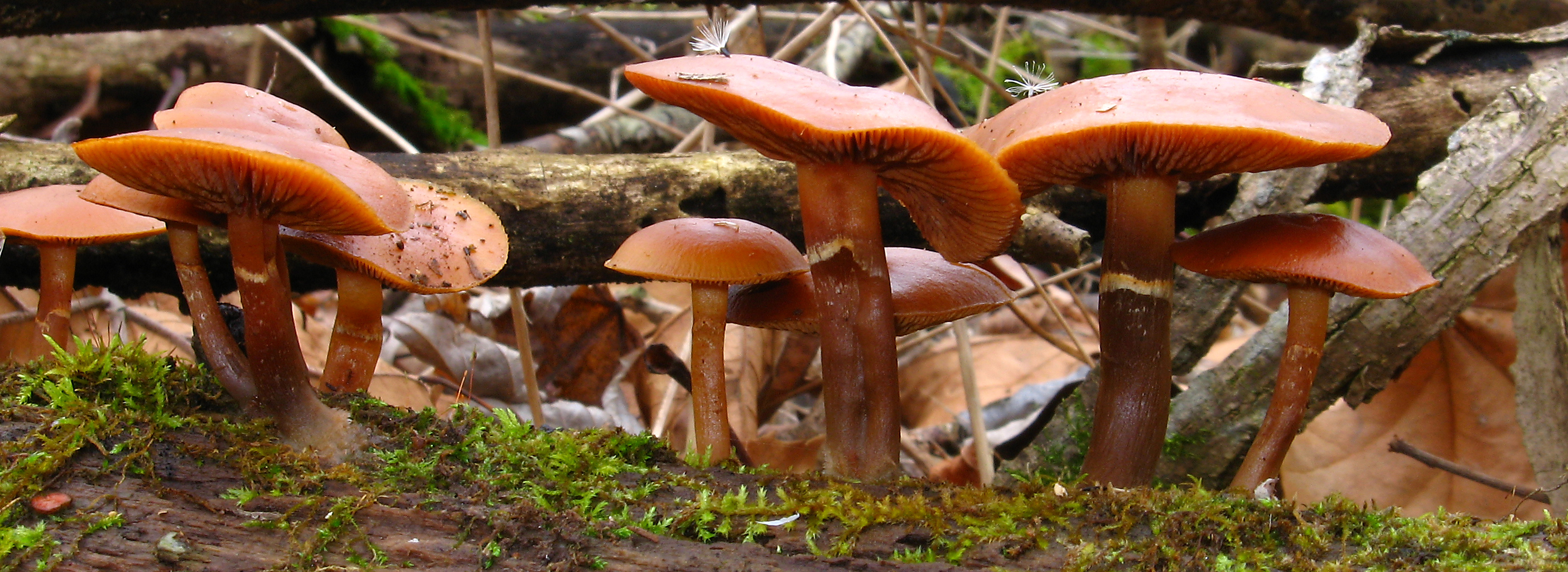
Galerina marginata contains deadly amounts of amatoxins.

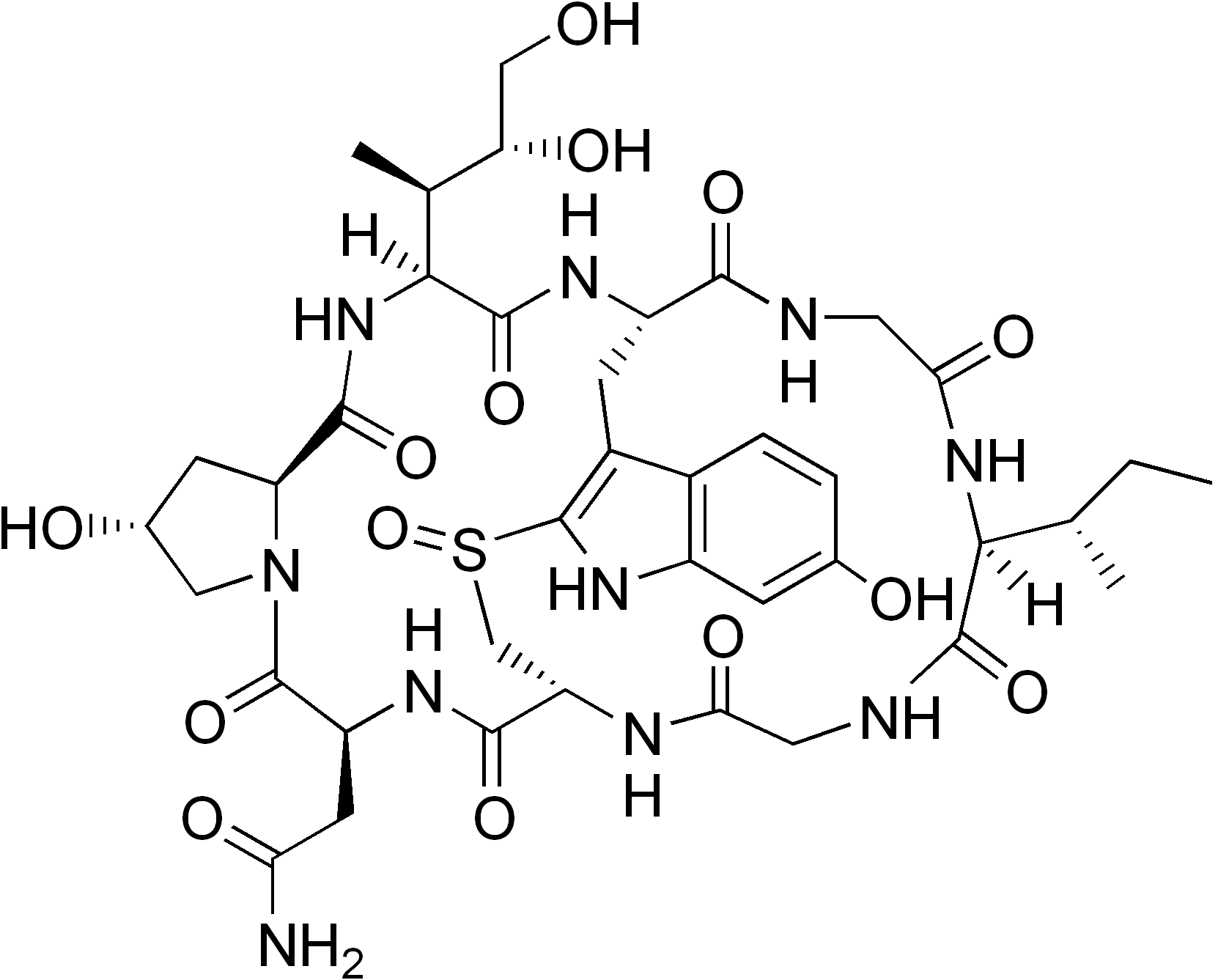
Alpha-amanitin chemical structure

The toxins found in Galerina marginata are known as amatoxins. Amatoxins belong to a family of bicyclic octapeptide derivatives composed of an amino acid ring bridged by a sulfur atom and characterized by differences in their side groups; these compounds are responsible for more than 90% of fatal mushroom poisonings in humans. The amatoxins inhibit the enzyme RNA polymerase II, which copies the genetic code of DNA into messenger RNA molecules. The toxin naturally accumulates in liver cells, and the ensuing disruption of metabolism accounts for the severe liver dysfunction cause by amatoxins. Amatoxins also lead to kidney failure because, as the kidneys attempt to filter out poison, it damages the convoluted tubules and reenters the blood to recirculate and cause more damage. Initial symptoms after ingestion include severe abdominal pain, vomiting, and diarrhea which may last for six to nine hours. Beyond these symptoms, toxins severely affect the liver which results in gastrointestinal bleeding, a coma, kidney failure, or even death, usually within seven days of consumption.

Galerina marginata was shown in various studies to contain the amatoxins α-amanitin and γ-amanitin, first as G. venenata, then as G. marginata and G. autumnalis. The ability of the fungus to produce these toxins was confirmed by growing the mycelium as a liquid culture (only trace amounts of β-amanitin were found). G. marginata is thought to be the only species of the amatoxin-producing genera that will produce the toxins while growing in culture. Both amanitins were quantified in G. autumnalis (1.5 mg/g dry weight) and G. marginata (1.1 mg/g dry weight). Later experiments confirmed the occurrence of γ-amanitin and β-amanitin in German specimens of G. autumnalis and G. marginata and revealed the presence of the three amanitins in the fruit bodies of G. unicolor. Although some mushroom field guides claim that the species (as G. autumnalis) also contains phallotoxins (however phallotoxins cannot be absorbed by humans), scientific evidence does not support this contention. A 2004 study determined that the amatoxin content of G. marginata varied from 78.17 to 243.61 μg/g of fresh weight. In this study, the amanitin amounts from certain Galerina specimens were higher than those from some Amanita phalloides, a European fungus generally considered as the richest in amanitins. The authors suggest that "other parameters such as extrinsic factors (environmental conditions) and intrinsic factors (genetic properties) could contribute to the significant variance in amatoxin contents from different specimens." The lethal dose of amatoxins has been estimated to be about 0.1 mg/kg human body weight, or even lower. Based on this value, the ingestion of 10 G. marginata fruit bodies containing about 250 μg of amanitins per gram of fresh tissue could poison a child weighing approximately 20 kilograms (44 lb). However, a 20-year retrospective study of more than 2100 cases of amatoxin poisonings from North American and Europe showed that few cases were due to ingestion of Galerina species. This low frequency may be attributed to the mushroom's nondescript appearance as a "little brown mushroom" leading to it being overlooked by collectors, and by the fact that 21% of amatoxin poisonings were caused by unidentified species.

The toxicity of certain Galerina species has been known for a century. In 1912, Charles Horton Peck reported a human poisoning case due to G. autumnalis. In 1954, a poisoning was caused by G. venenata. Between 1978 and 1995, ten cases caused by amatoxin-containing Galerinas were reported in the literature. Three European cases, two from Finland and one from France were attributed to G. marginata and G. unicolor, respectively. Seven North American exposures included two fatalities from Washington due to G. venenata, with five cases reacting positively to treatment; four poisonings were caused by G. autumnalis from Michigan and Kansas, in addition to poisoning caused by an unidentified Galerina species from Ohio. Several poisonings have been attributed to collectors consuming the mushrooms after mistaking them for the hallucinogenic Psilocybe stuntzii.

== See also ==
- List of deadly fungi
