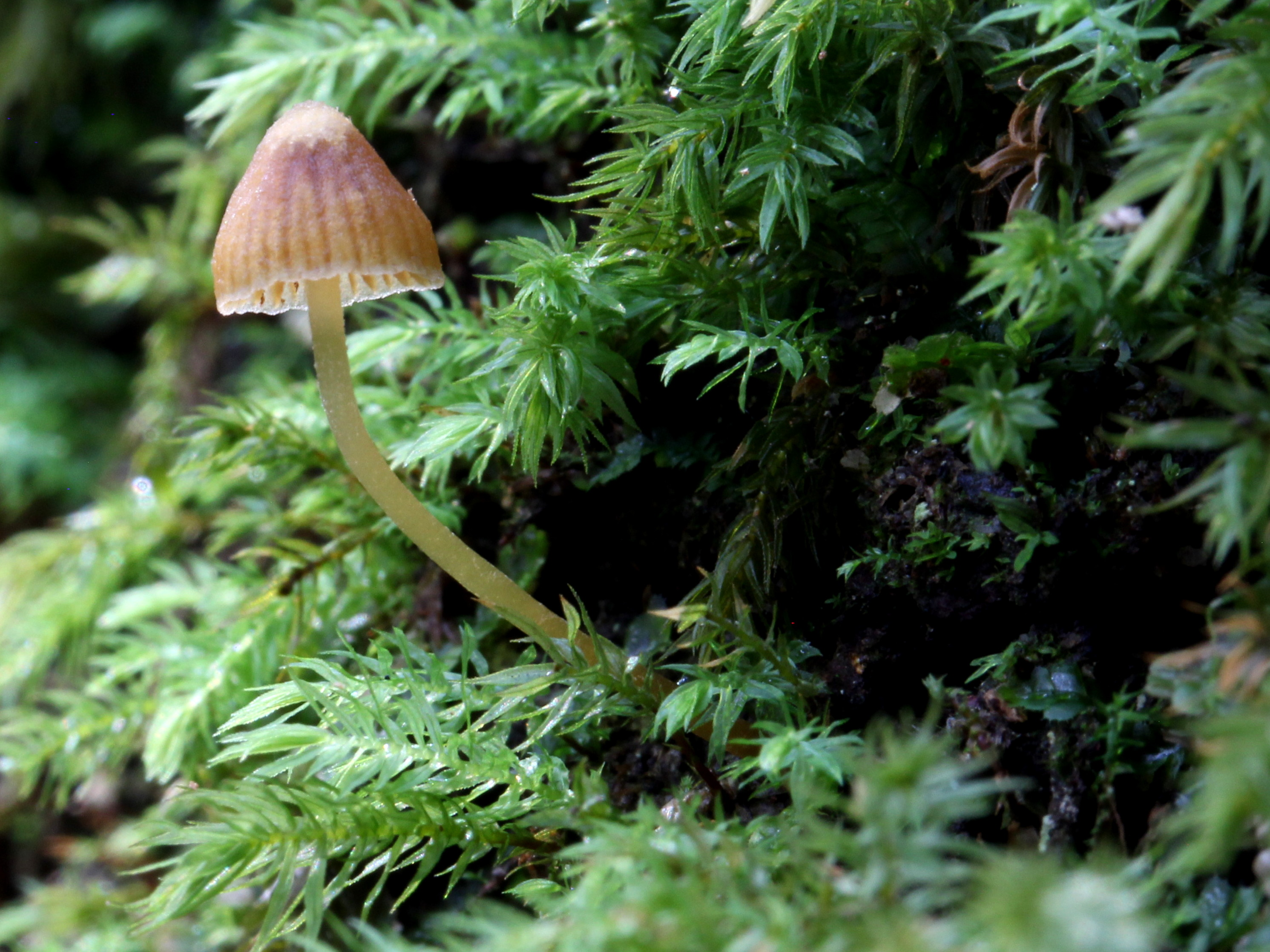
- mushroom with the Parramatta moss

Scientific classification
- Kingdom: Fungi
- Division: Basidiomycota
- Class: Agaricomycetes
- Order: Agaricales
- Family: Hymenogastraceae
- Genus: Galerina
- Species: G. hypnorum

Binomial name
- Galerina hypnorum (Schrank) Kühner

= Galerina hypnorum =

Species of fungus

Galerina hypnorum is a species of agaric fungus in the family Hymenogastraceae. The species has a hygrophanous cap measuring 4-15 mm in diameter, initially conical and becoming broadly convex with age. When moist, the cap is honey-yellow to ochraceous tawny, fading to buff or tawny brown as it dries. The surface is striate when wet and glabrous to faintly fibrillose.
