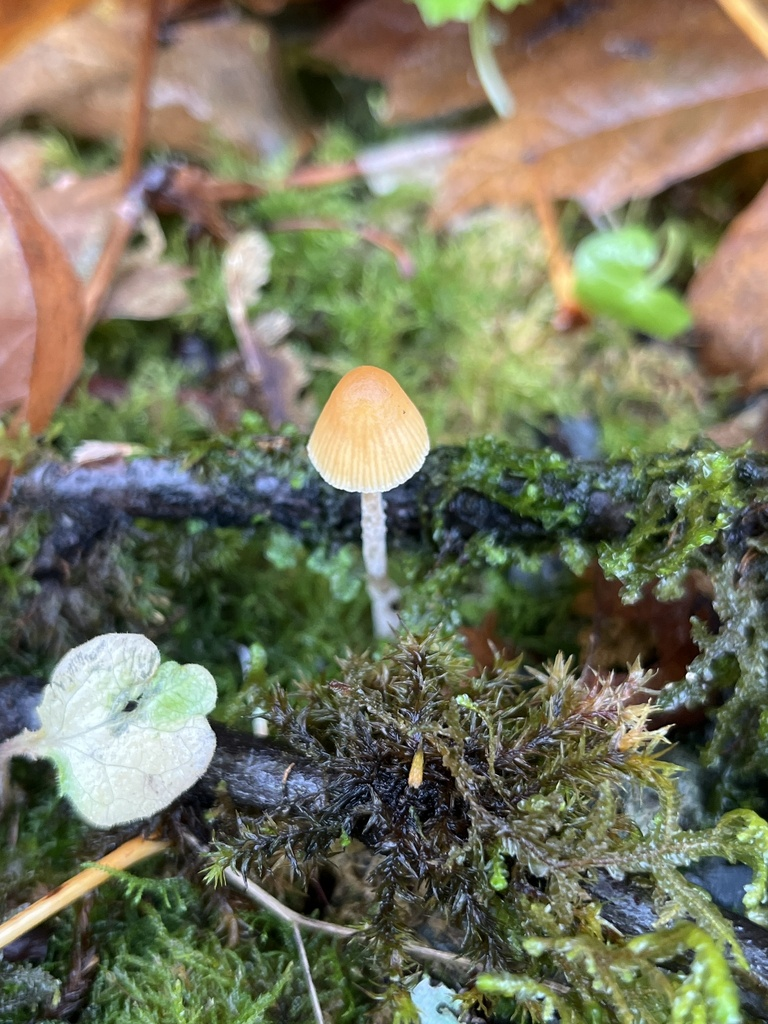

Scientific classification
- Kingdom: Fungi
- Division: Basidiomycota
- Class: Agaricomycetes
- Order: Agaricales
- Family: Hymenogastraceae
- Genus: Galerina
- Species: G. semilanceata

Binomial name
- Galerina semilanceata (Peck) A.H.Sm. & Singer

= Galerina semilanceata =

Species of fungus

Galerina semilanceata
- Mycological characteristics
- Gills on hymenium
- Cap is conical or campanulate
- Hymenium is adnate or adnexed
- Stipe is bare
- Spore print is brown
- Edibility is unknown

Galerina semilanceata is a species of mushroom in the genus Galerina native to Washington state and California.

== Description ==
This species is identified by its heavily veined, light colored cap, and small white V shaped powderings that go up the stem. The mushrooms are usually about 3 cm all around.

== Habitat and ecology ==
Galerina semilanceata fruits from fall until spring on moss, including on mossy lawns.

== Conservation status ==
This species is not of concern and is quite common.
