= Pholiota vernalis =

Scientific classification
- Domain: Eukaryota
- Kingdom: Fungi
- Division: Basidiomycota
- Class: Agaricomycetes
- Order: Agaricales
- Family: Strophariaceae
- Genus: Pholiota
- Species: P. vernalis

Binomial name
- Pholiota vernalis (Sacc.) A.H. Sm. & Hesler

Synonyms
- Agaricus vernalis Peck; Kuehneromyces vernalis (Sacc.) Singer & A.H.Sm. Kuehneromyces vernalis f. amarus Singer & A.H.Sm. Naucoria vernalis Sacc.

Species of fungus

Pholiota vernalis is a species of fungus belonging to the family Strophariaceae.

It has cosmopolitan distribution.
