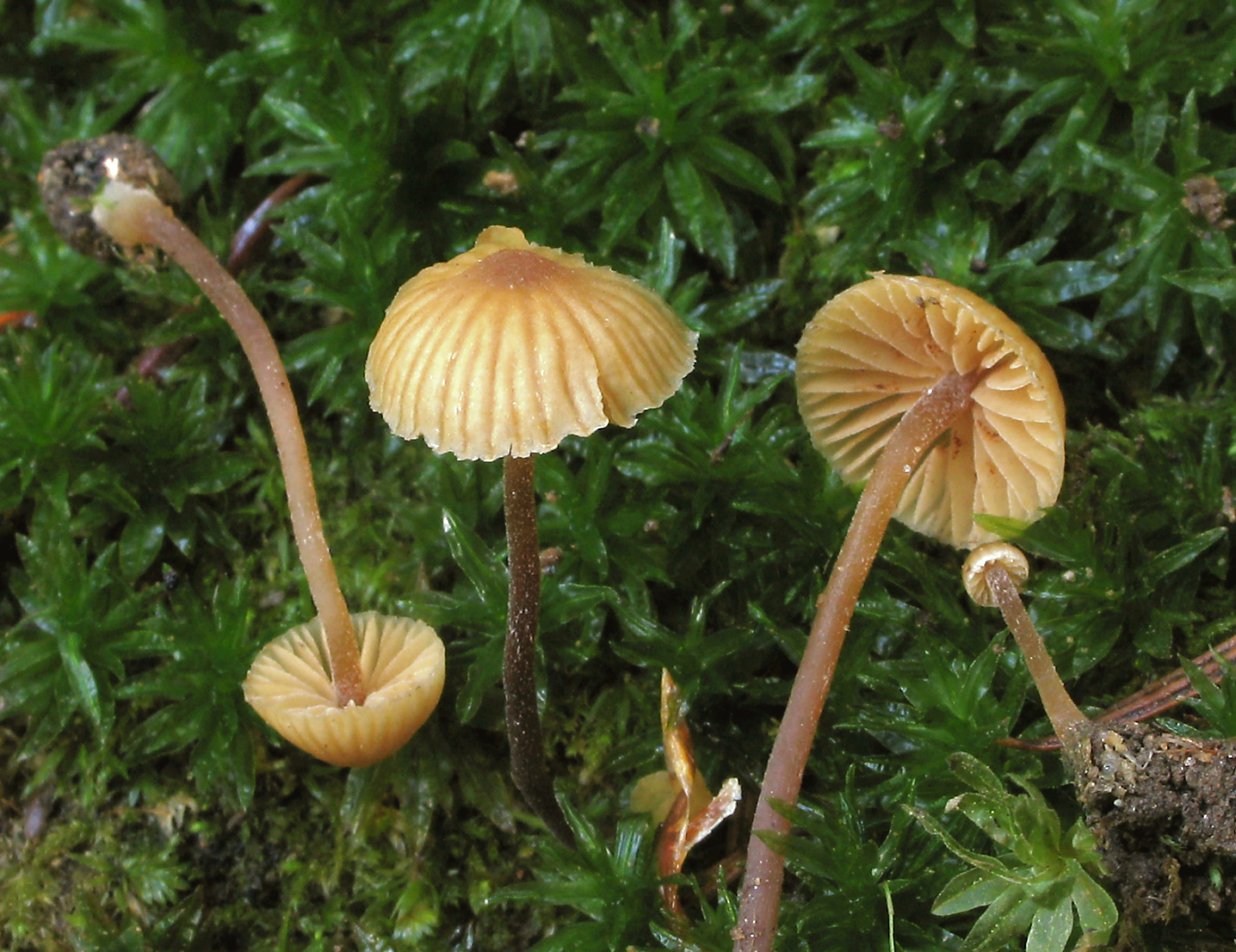
- Galerina vittiformis f. tetraspora

Scientific classification
- Kingdom: Fungi
- Division: Basidiomycota
- Class: Agaricomycetes
- Order: Agaricales
- Family: Hymenogastraceae
- Genus: Galerina; Earle (1909)

Type species
- Galerina vittiformis (Fr.) Singer (1950)

Subgenera
- Galerina Kühner; Naucoriopsis Kühner; Tubariopsis Kühner

Synonyms
- Agaricus tribus Galera Fr. (1821); Galera (Fr.) Kummer (1871) (non Galera Blume (1825)); Galerula P.Karst. (1879); Pholidotopsis Earle (1909); Velomycena Pilát (1953)

= Galerina =

Genus of saprobic fungi

Galerina is a genus of tiny brown-spore saprobic mushroom-bearing fungi, with over 300 species found throughout the world. Galerina mushrooms are typically small and hygrophanous, with a slender and brittle stem. They are often found growing on wood, and when on the ground have a preference for mossy habitats. The genus is noted for some extremely poisonous species which are occasionally confused with hallucinogenic species of Psilocybe or with edible species.

Prior to 1909, the genus was known as Galera, however, this was an invalid name due to the name being used earlier for a genus of orchids. In 1909, Franklin Sumner Earle renamed the genus under a valid name, Galerina.

== Description ==
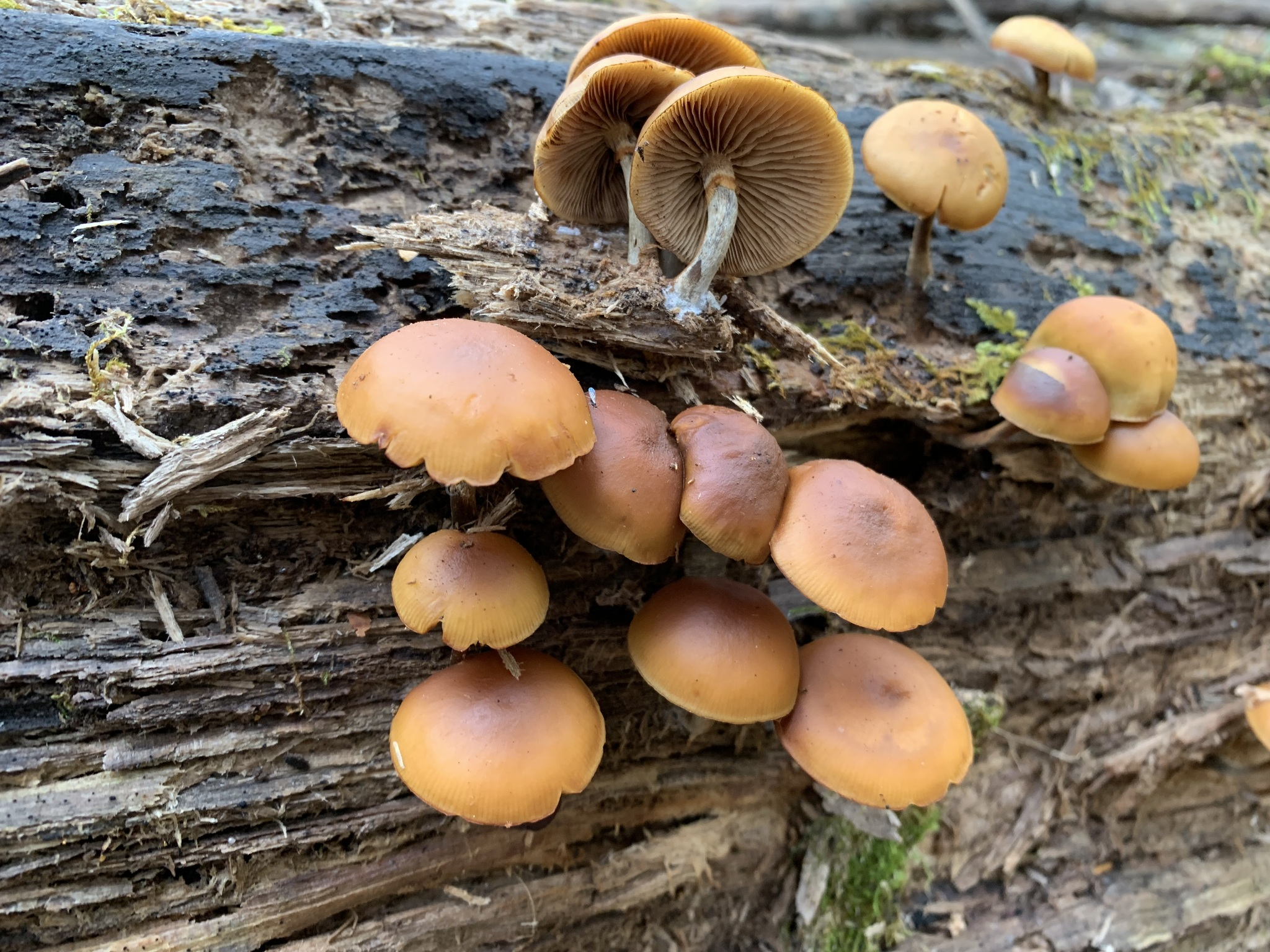
Galerina marginata

Galerina fruiting bodies are typically small, undistinguished mushrooms with a typical "little brown mushroom" morphology and a yellow-brown, light brown to cinnamon-brown spore print. Most species are small and have a superficially mycenoid appearance, except for the Naucoriopsis group (including G. marginata), that are fleshier and naucorioid in appearance. The pileus is typically glabrous and often hygrophanous, and a cortina-type veil is present in young specimens of roughly half of recognized species, though it sometimes disappears as the mushroom ages in many of these species.

Microscopically, they are highly variable as well, though most species have spores that are ornamented, lack a germ pore, and have a plage. Many species also have characteristic tibiiform cystidia. However, there are many exceptions, and many species of Galerina lack one or more of these microscopic characteristics. Ecologically, all Galerina are saprobic, growing in habitats like rotting wood or in moss.

The spores of Galerina feature an ornamentation that comes from the outer layer of the spore breaking up on maturity to produce either warts, wrinkles or "ears", flaps of material loosened from where the spore was attached to the basidia. This outer layer of the spore often is not complete, but has a clear patch in many species just above the attachment, this clear patch is called a plage. This plage is not evident in all species, and the spore covering does not always breakup in all species, making it sometimes difficult to correctly determine a mushroom of this genus.

Species have a pileipellis that is a cutis, and ornamented spores that are brown in deposit, where the spore ornamentation comes from an extra spore

The specific features that define the genus require a microscope to confirm. In the wild it can be difficult to determine a Galerina from a number of similar genera, such as Pholiota, Tubaria, Conocybe, Pholiotina, Agrocybe, Gymnopilus, Phaeogalera and Psilocybe. For the most part, Galerinas will be found associated with moss, and this can separate out the genus in nature fairly well. But this identification is more difficult in the section Naucoriopsis, which does not associate with moss, and is a decomposer of wood.

Phaeogalera is a genus that was segregated from Galerina by Robert Kühner.

== Etymology ==
Galerina is derived from the earlier genus name Galera, which is the singular feminine first declension of the Latin word galerum, meaning a helmet or cap made of animal skin or leather. The suffix -ina is the feminine form of -inus, meaning "resembling" or "pertaining to".

== Taxonomy ==
=== History ===
This taxon was first described in 1821 by Elias Magnus Fries in his work Systema Mycologicum, where it was designated as the tribe Galera (at that time, the taxonomic rank of tribe was placed below that of genus) in the genus Agaricus (which in early fungal classification included all gilled mushrooms). In 1871, Paul Kummer in Der Führer in die Pilzkunde raised Galera to the rank of genus. This genus name was recognized and used by mycologists for several decades, however, the name was invalidly published, as Galera already existed as a genus name, having been used by Carl Ludwig Blume in 1825 to describe a genus of orchids (treated as a taxonomic synonym for Epipogium currently). In 1909, Franklin Sumner Earle validly published the genus under a new name, Galerina.

=== Phylogeny and current status ===
Molecular studies have demonstrated that Galerina is polyphyletic. Gulden et al. (2005), using LSU and ITS sequences, recovered three or four well-supported monophyletic groups that correspond closely to Kühner’s subgenera and several of Smith & Singer’s sections. A subsequent multi-locus analysis (ITS, LSU, RPB2) by Landry et al. (2021) confirmed and refined this topology: the Naucoriopsis and core Galerina clades form a supported sister pair; Tubariopsis is sister to this pair or only weakly supported; the Sideroides clade occupies a more distant position, sometimes near Psilocybe; and the traditional Mycenopsis assemblage is paraphyletic, with Gymnopilus nested within it. These findings do not invalidate the continued use of a broad Galerina concept for practical identification. The genus is recognised by a combination of characters rather than unique apomorphies. Species are typically small to very small agarics with hygrophanous, often translucently striate caps in shades of yellow-brown to umber. Gills are adnate to adnexed or occasionally decurrent and produce a rusty-brown to ochraceous-brown spore deposit. The stipe is slender and may bear a cortina, membranous annulus or annular zone. Most species are saprotrophic on decaying wood, among bryophytes (especially Sphagnum and other mosses), or in humus. Microscopically, spores are ellipsoid to amygdaliform, pigmented and, in most species, verruculose with a smooth plage; a germ pore is present in only a minority of taxa. Cystidia are highly variable (tibiiform, ventricose-fusiform, metuloid or rounded) and taxonomically informative. Clamp connections are usually present and the pileipellis is a cutis, sometimes slightly ixocutis. Current phylogenetic evidence supports recognition of several principal clades:

- Naucoriopsis clade (largely corresponding to section Naucoriopsis): more robust species, frequently with a membranous annulus or distinct annular zone; predominantly lignicolous; spores distinctly verrucose with a conspicuous plage; large ventricose-fusiform pleuro- and cheilocystidia. This clade is the only one in which amatoxins have so far been detected.

- Core Galerina clade (section Galerina sensu stricto, containing the type species): delicate, mycenoid, predominantly bryophilous taxa lacking a persistent veil; prominently ornamented spores with plage and large ventricose-fusiform cystidia that may also occur as caulocystidia and pileocystidia. Many species are two-spored.

- Tubariopsis clade: characterised by dominant tibiiform cystidia on gill edges, stipe and often the cap; pleurocystidia absent or scarce; many species associated with Sphagnum or other wetland mosses; some lack clamp connections.

- Sideroides clade: tibiiform cystidia prominent but spores smooth or nearly smooth; occupies an intermediate morphological position and is placed more distantly in molecular trees.

- The traditional Mycenopsis assemblage is paraphyletic; it comprises mostly moss-dwelling species with smooth or minutely ornamented spores and cheilocystidia only. Parts of this group contain Gymnopilus.

Peripheral sections recognised by Smith & Singer (Inocyboides, Calyptrospora, Physocystis, Porospora) are defined by specialised microscopic characters; some taxa formerly placed in Porospora are now often referred to Phaeogalera. These groups remain incompletely sampled in molecular datasets and their precise placement continues to be refined.

== Identification ==
The extreme toxicity of some Galerina species means that recognition of Galerina is of great importance to mushroom hunters who are seeking hallucinogenic Psilocybe mushrooms. Species like Galerina marginata may bear a superficial resemblance to Psilocybe cyanescens and other Psilocybe species, and has often been found growing amongst and around Psilocybe cyanescens and other Psilocybe species, making identification all the more confusing to the uninitiated. Galerina can be distinguished from psilocybin Psilocybe by the following characteristics:

- Spore print color: blackish-brown to lilac-brown in Psilocybe, light brown to rusty brown in Galerina. Spore color can be seen by taking a spore print or by looking for evidence of spore drop on the stipe or on surrounding mushrooms.
- Staining reaction: Psilocybin Psilocybe fruiting bodies stain blue to varying degrees when bruised, while Galerina do not (with the only exception of Galerina steglichii, a species endemic to Germany.

The strength of this reaction varies with the amount of psilocin present in the tissues of the mushroom. Fruiting bodies with little psilocin (such as Psilocybe semilanceata, with high psilocybin and low psilocin content) will stain weakly if at all, while sporocarps with a high psilocin content will stain strongly blue. Only one rare Galerina has blue-staining tissue, though in some cases the flesh will blacken when handled, and this may be misinterpreted as a bluing reaction.

Although these rules are specific to the separation of Galerina from certain Psilocybe, since mixed patches of Psilocybe and Galerina can occur, it is essential to be sure of the identity of each sporocarp collected.

Galerina also present some risk of confusion with several species of small edible mushrooms, notably Kuehneromyces mutabilis and candy caps (L. camphoratus and allies).

== Toxicity ==
Many Galerina species in the section Naucoriopsis contain alpha-amanitin and other amatoxins. These compounds have not been detected in Galerina species outside of Naucoriopsis. Galerina marginata (also known as "autumn skullcap", "deadly galerina", etc.) is a poisonous species found throughout the temperate regions of the world, in habitats as diverse as forests and urban parklands, wherever rotting wood is found. Galerina sulciceps, is a lethal species found in Indonesia and responsible for deaths there. Several studies have found that it contains a higher concentration of amatoxins by weight than Amanita phalloides.

Galerina steglichii is very rare, bruises blue and contains the hallucinogen psilocybin.

A 2026 study found that Galerina indica produced both psiloid compounds and amatoxins, the first mushroom of any kind confirmed to do so.

== Selected species ==
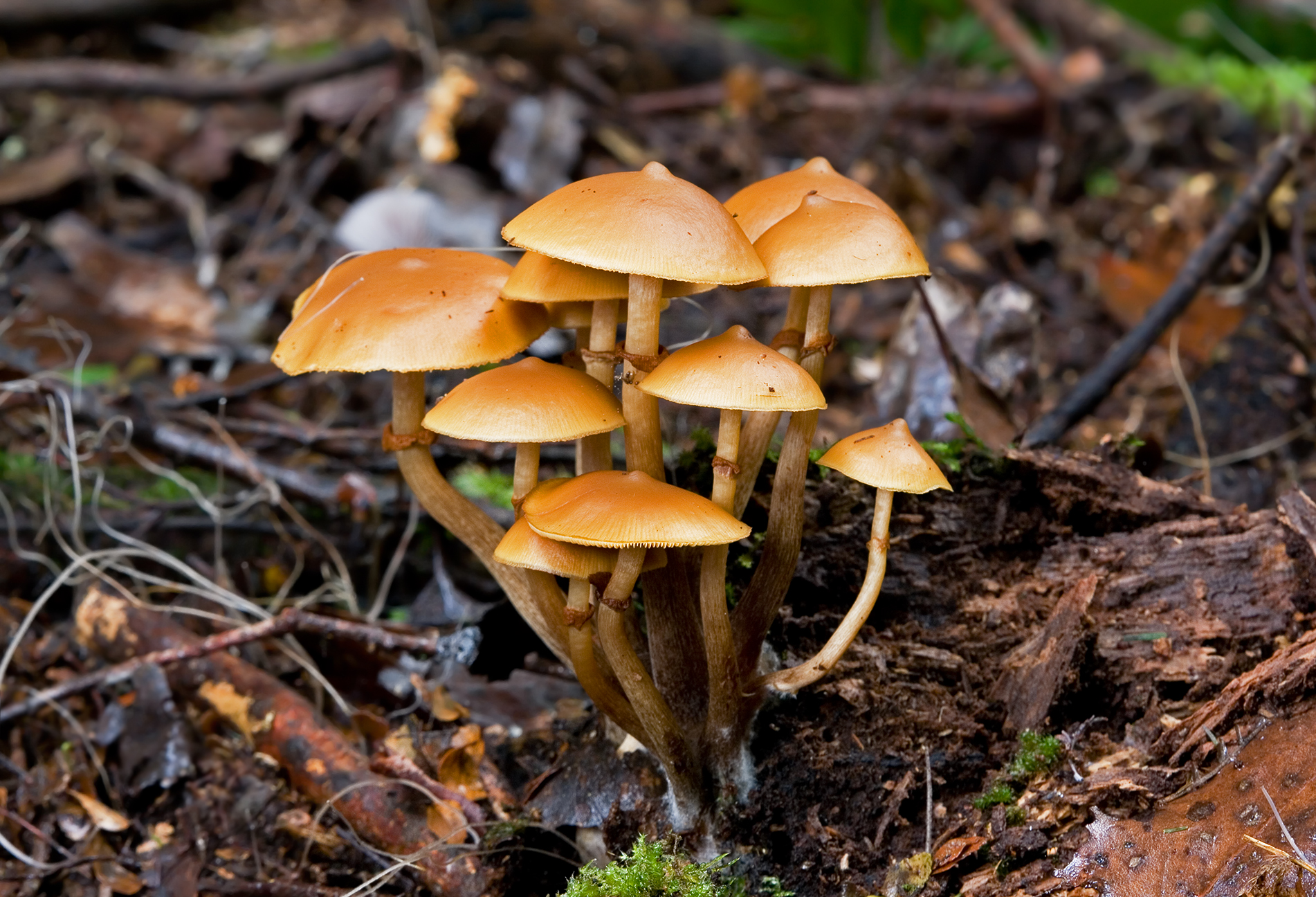
Galerina patagonica at Marriott Falls Track, Tasmania, Australia

Galerina vittiformis is the type species of the genus Galerina. This species is common in beds of damp moss (along with many other species of Galerina). There are a number of variations of this species that have been named over the years: var. vittiformis f. vittiformis is a 2-spored species; var. vittiformis f. tetrasporis is a 4-spored form; var. pachyspora has been collected on Macquarie Island.

In 2001, DNA studies found that Galerina autumnalis and five other species of Galerina with similar morphologies were, in fact, synonyms of Galerina marginata.

Galerina patagonica has a Gondwanan distribution. Galerina hypnorum is a widespread species.

Galerina graminea can survive in moss-free grass, unlike many Galerina mushrooms. It was known for many years as 'Galerina laevis', proposed by Christiaan Hendrik Persoon.

Several Galerina species are listed by the US Forest Service as "species of special concern" in the Northwest Forest Plan. These species are considered indicator species for old growth coniferous forest in the Pacific Northwest: Galerina atkinsonia, Galerina cerina, Galerina heterocystis, Galerina sphagnicola, and Galerina vittiformis.
