= Galerina steglichii =

Scientific classification
- Kingdom: Fungi
- Division: Basidiomycota
- Class: Agaricomycetes
- Order: Agaricales
- Family: Hymenogastraceae
- Genus: Galerina
- Species: G. steglichii

Binomial name
- Galerina steglichii Besl 1993

Species of fungus

Galerina steglichii is a mushroom in the family Hymenogastraceae described by Besl in 1993, and named after Wolfgang Steglich.

== Chemistry ==
The mushroom contains psilocybin.
