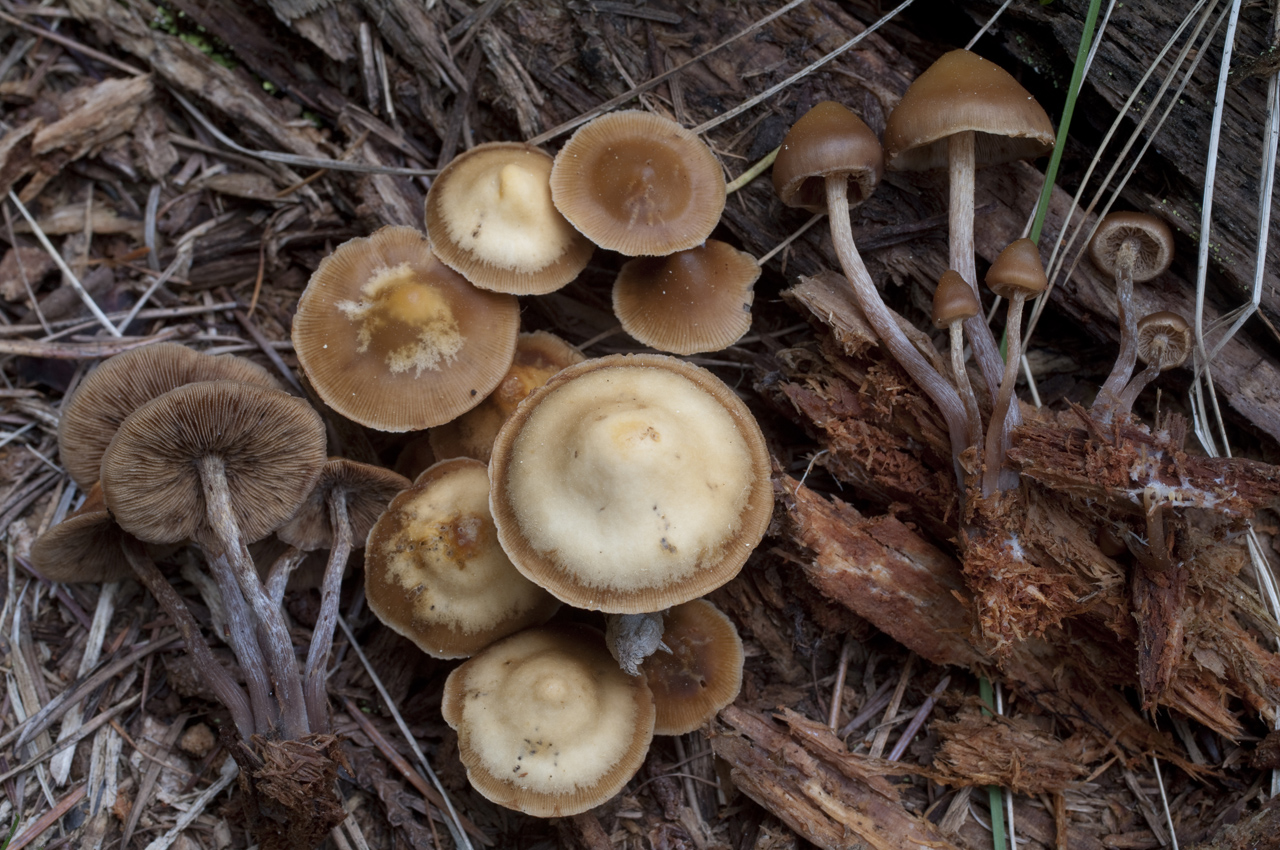

Scientific classification
- Kingdom: Fungi
- Division: Basidiomycota
- Class: Agaricomycetes
- Order: Agaricales
- Family: Strophariaceae
- Genus: Pholiota
- Species: P. lignicola

Binomial name
- Pholiota lignicola (Peck) Jacobsson

= Pholiota lignicola =

Species of fungus

Pholiota lignicola is a species of mushroom-forming fungus belonging to the family Strophariaceae. It has a cosmopolitan distribution.

== Description ==
The cap of Pholiota lignicola is about 1-3 centimeters in diameter. It starts out campanulate or conical, before expanding to convex, umbonate, or flat. It is brownish in color. The stipe is about 2.5-5 centimeters long and 2-3.5 centimeters wide. The gills can be adnexed or sinuate, and are brownish in color. The spore print is brown.

== Habitat and ecology ==
Pholiota lignicola grows on wood and fruits during spring and summer. It can be found in forests or on woodchips.

Pholiota lignicola
- Mycological characteristics
- Gills on hymenium
- Cap is conical or flat
- Hymenium is adnexed or sinuate
- Stipe is bare
- Spore print is brown
- Edibility is not recommended
