= Robert Kühner =

French mycologist

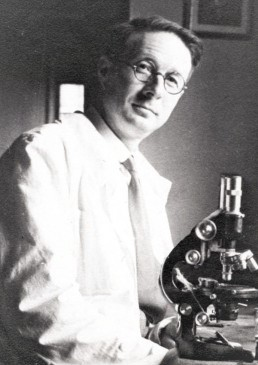
- Robert Kühner
- Born: 15 March 1903; Paris
- Died: 27 February 1996 (aged 92); Lyon
- Education: University of Paris
- Known for: Agaricales
- Scientific career
- Fields: Mycology
- Workplaces: University of Lyon

Robert Kühner (15 March 1903 in Paris – 27 February 1996 in Lyon) was a French mycologist most notable for reviewing many forms of agaric (mushroom fungus) genera.

He studied at the Sorbonne, afterwards from 1921 until 1932, he was working as a high school teacher in Lille. Then, from 1938 until 1973, he was associated with the Faculty of Sciences at Lyon.

He was honoured in 1946, with Kuehneromyces, which is a genus of fungi in the family Strophariaceae.

== Selected works ==
- Contribution à l'étude des hyménomycètes et spécialement des agaricacés, 1926 - Contribution to the study of Hymenomycetes and especially of Agaricales.
- Le genre Galera (Fries) Quélet, 1935 - The genus Galera (Fries) Quélet.
- Le genre Mycena (Fries) Étude cytologique et systématique des espèces d'Europe et d'Amérique du Nord, 1938 - The genus Mycena (Fries), cytological and systematic studies of species native to Europe and North America.
- Flore analytique des champignons supérieurs (agarics, bolets, chanterelles), 1953 - Analysis of major mushrooms (agarics, boletes, chanterelles).
- Compléments à la "Flore analytique, 1954 - Additions to the "Flora analytique".
- Agaricales de la zone alpine: Amanitacées, 1972 - Agaricales of the Alpine zone: Amanitaceae.
