= Psilocybe naematoliformis =

Scientific classification
- Kingdom: Fungi
- Division: Basidiomycota
- Class: Agaricomycetes
- Order: Agaricales
- Family: Hymenogastraceae
- Genus: Psilocybe
- Species: P. naematoliformis

Binomial name
- Psilocybe naematoliformis Guzmán (1979)

Synonyms
- Naematoloma naematoliforme (Guzmán) Guzmán (1980); Hypholoma naematoliformis (Guzmán) Guzmán (1999)

Species of fungus

Psilocybe naematoliformis
- Mycological characteristics
- Gills on hymenium
- Cap is umbonate or campanulate
- Hymenium is adnate or sinuate
- Stipe is bare
- Spore print is purple-brown
- Ecology is saprotrophic
- Edibility is psychoactive

Psilocybe naematoliformis, is a species of fungus in the mushroom family Hymenogastraceae. It is a psilocybin mushroom, having psilocybin and psilocin as the main active hallucinogenic compounds.

== Discovery and classification ==
The species was originally found by mycologist Gastón Guzmán in a tropical rainforest at Uxpanapa Region, in the State of Veracruz in southeastern Mexico; he reported the finding in a 1979 publication, and called the fungus Psilocybe naematoliformis. Guzmán later considered species with chrysocystidia (cystidia whose contents contain a distinct refractive yellow body, that become more deeply yellow when stained with ammonia or other alkaline compounds) to be separate from Psilocybe, and transferred the species first to Naematoloma in 1980, and then later to Hypholoma in 1999. In 2004, Guzmán revised his opinion again, and considered the species more suitably placed in Psilocybe.

P. naematoliformi is in the section Neocaledonicae, a group of related tropical and subtropical species in the genus Psilocybe; other members of the section include Psilocybe aequatoriae (Ecuador), Psilocybe neocaledonicum (New Caledonia), and Psilocybe neorhombispora (Mexico).

== Description ==
The cap is 1–3 cm (0.4–1.2 in) in diameter, bell-shaped to subumbonate, smooth, and slightly slimy but soon dry. The color may range from a pale orange-brown to a deep rusty brown. It is hygrophanous, fading to buff; the color is blackish brown when dry, and slightly translucent-striate when wet. Like other hallucinogenic psilocybes, it stains blue when bruised or injured. The gills are adnate in attachment to the stem, or may be notched at the point of attachment (sinuate). They are narrow, and brownish violet to dark violet, with whitish edges. The stem is 3.5–5.5 cm (1.4–2.2 in) tall by 1–3 mm thick, subequal, flexuous, and hollow. The color of the stem is reddish-brown or brownish; it is densely covered with silk-like fibers, and tufts of soft woolly hairs. The veil does not form an annulus. The taste of this species has been described as slightly bitter, and the smell slightly farinaceous, like grain.

=== Microscopic features ===
The spores have dimensions of (3.8)4.9–5.5(6.6) by (3.3)4.4–5(6.6) by 3.8–4.4 μm, sublentiform (shaped somewhat like a biconvex lens) in face view or roughly elliptic in side view, with an inconspicuous hilar appendage. They have a distinct germ pore in the base, and are smooth and thick-walled. The basidia, the spore-bearing cells in the hymenium, are 12–19 by 4.4–5.5 μm, and hyaline. The pleurocystidia (cystidia on the gill face) are 15–29 by 5.5–8.8 μm; clear, gray or brown in color, fusoid-ventricose to mucronate, sometimes with a median constriction, similar to the species Psilocybe subaeruginosa Clel. from Australia. The cheilocystidia (cystidia on the gill edge) are 12–28 by 5.5–7.7 μm, hyaline, very numerous, ventricose, mucronate or fusiform-lanceolate, often forked.

== Habitat and distribution ==
Psilocybe naematoliformis is found growing in small groups, in tufts or clumps, on disturbed places of the virgin tropical rain forest; it grows in soil with a few herbaceous plants. This species was originally found in Mexico, State of Veracruz, Uxpanapa region,.
