= Deconica neorhombispora =

Scientific classification
- Kingdom: Fungi
- Division: Basidiomycota
- Class: Agaricomycetes
- Order: Agaricales
- Family: Strophariaceae
- Genus: Deconica
- Species: D. neorhombispora

Binomial name
- Deconica neorhombispora (Guzmán) P.S. Silva, Ram.-Cruz & Guzmán, (2013)

Synonyms
- Naematoloma rhombisporum Guzmán (1980); Hypholoma rhombispora (Guzmán) Guzmán (1999); Psilocybe neorhombispora (Guzmán) Guzmán (2004); Psilocybe subbrunneocystidiata P.S. Silva & Guzmán

Species of fungus

Deconica neorhombispora is a species of agaric fungus in the family Strophariaceae. It can be found in Brazil and Mexico. It was originally described from specimens found near San Bartolomé Ayautla, Oaxaca, Mexico as Naematoloma rhombisporum, then transferred to Hypholoma rhombispora. After this, it was transferred to Psilocybe neorhombispora because the name "Psilocybe rhombispora" was already occupied, but this species is now a synonym of Deconica phyllogena. Psilocybe neorhombispora was finally transferred to Deconica neorhombispora. Psilocybe subbrunneocystidiata was originally named as a new species of Psilocybe from Itapuã State Park in Rio Grande do Sul, Brazil. The authors assigned it to Psilocybe section brunneocystidiatae with Psilocybe brunneocystidiata, Psilocybe neocaledonica and Psilocybe aureicystidiata. Psilocybe subbrunneocystidiata was found to be a synonym of Deconica neorhombispora. Psilocybe neocaledonica and Psilocybe aureicystidiata were also found to belong in Deconica.
