= Deconica semiinconspicua =

Scientific classification
- Domain: Eukaryota
- Kingdom: Fungi
- Division: Basidiomycota
- Class: Agaricomycetes
- Order: Agaricales
- Family: Strophariaceae
- Genus: Deconica
- Species: D. semiinconspicua

Binomial name
- Deconica semiinconspicua (Guzmán & J. M. Trappe) Ram.-Cruz & Guzmán (2012)

Synonyms
- Psilocybe semiinconspicua Guzmán & J. M. Trappe (2005)

Species of fungus

Deconica semiinconspicua is a mushroom native to the state of Washington in the United States. The mushroom is small, rare, difficult to see and, according to Guzmán and Trappe (2005), stains blue where damaged. However, Ramírez-Cruz et al. (2012) state that it is "without a really observable bluing reaction". It was described as a psychoactive species of Psilocybe in section Semilanceatae, but Ramírez-Cruz et al. (2012) found that its macroscopic and microscopic morphological features and its DNA sequence, which Ramírez-Cruz et al. did not publish, were a better match for Deconica. Ramírez-Cruz et al. (2012) also stated that it is very similar to Deconica montana. It can be mistaken for Psilocybe silvatica and can be distinguished by its more conic cap, narrower spores and narrower cheilocystidia.

This mushroom is only known from the type locality where it was found on July 22, 1987, at Glacier Peak Wilderness Area in Wentachee National Forest, Washington, USA.

== Description ==
=== Cap ===
The cap is 7–12 mm and convex, becoming nearly plane in age. It is hygrophanous, has a smooth surface, and is olive black when moist, fading to brownish orange or dark reddish brown as it dries.

=== Gills ===
The gills are Adnate light grayish brown at first, turning dark purple as the spores mature.

=== Spores ===
Deconica semiinconspicua spores are 8–10 x 5–7 μm, subovoid to ellipsoid, thick-walled, and yellowish brown to dark purple brown in deposit.

=== Stipe ===
The stipe is 15–20 x 2 mm, hollow, has an equal width, and is white with whitish or brownish floccose scales, drying to a reddish brown. It stains blue near the base according to Guzmán and Trappe (2005). Ramírez-Cruz et al. (2012) state that it is "without a really observable bluing reaction".

=== Microscopic features ===
The basidia of Deconica semiinconspicua have four spores each. The cheilocystidia are sublageniform and 24–30 x 6–8 μm. No pleurocystidia have been observed. Clamp connections are present.

== Habitat ==
Deconica semiinconspicua is gregarious in small groups among shrubs on a creek bank.
