= Deconica pegleriana =

Scientific classification
- Kingdom: Fungi
- Division: Basidiomycota
- Class: Agaricomycetes
- Order: Agaricales
- Family: Strophariaceae
- Genus: Deconica
- Species: D. pegleriana

Binomial name
- Deconica pegleriana (Singer) Ram.-Cruz & Guzmán (2012)

Synonyms
- Psilocybe pegleriana Guzmán (2000)

Species of fungus

Deconica pegleriana is a species of mushroom in the family Strophariaceae. It can be found in Mexico, Thailand, India, Papua New Guinea, the Southeastern United States and South America.
