= Deconica alpestris =

Scientific classification
- Domain: Eukaryota
- Kingdom: Fungi
- Division: Basidiomycota
- Class: Agaricomycetes
- Order: Agaricales
- Family: Strophariaceae
- Genus: Deconica
- Species: D. alpestris

Binomial name
- Deconica alpestris (Singer) Ram.-Cruz & Guzmán (2012)

Synonyms
- Psilocybe alpestris Singer (1989)

Species of fungus

Deconica alpestris is a species of mushroom in the family Strophariaceae. Its holotype was found by Rolf Singer in 1979 growing on calcareous soil at an elevation of 1900 meters in the alps in Austria.
