= Deconica pseudobullacea =

Scientific classification
- Domain: Eukaryota
- Kingdom: Fungi
- Division: Basidiomycota
- Class: Agaricomycetes
- Order: Agaricales
- Family: Strophariaceae
- Genus: Deconica
- Species: D. pseudobullacea

Binomial name
- Deconica pseudobullacea (Petch) Ram.-Cruz & Guzmán (2012)

Synonyms
- Stropharia pseudobullacea Petch (1924); Psilocybe pseudobullacea (Petch) Pegler (1977)

Species of fungus

Deconica pseudobullacea is a species of mushroom in the family Strophariaceae.
