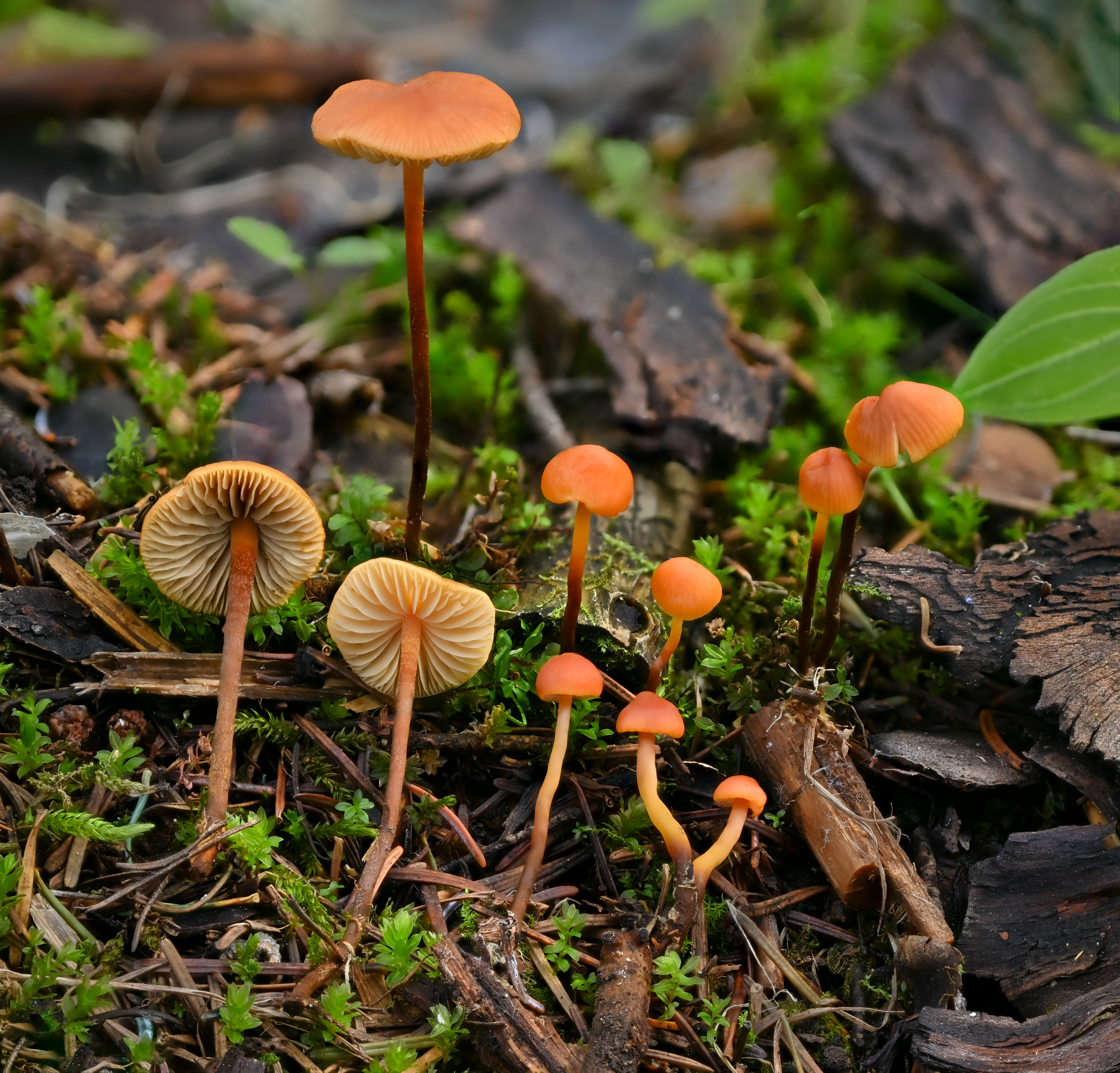

Conservation status
- Vulnerable (NatureServe)

Scientific classification
- Kingdom: Fungi
- Division: Basidiomycota
- Class: Agaricomycetes
- Order: Agaricales
- Family: Mythicomycetaceae
- Genus: Mythicomyces; Redhead & A.H.Sm. (1986)
- Species: M. corneipes

Binomial name
- Mythicomyces corneipes (Fr.) Redhead & A.H.Sm. (2011)

Synonyms
- Agaricus corneipes Fr. (1861); Geophila corneipes (Fr.) Quél. (1886); Psilocybe corneipes (Fr.) P.Karst. (1879)

= Mythicomyces =

Genus of fungi

Mythicomyces corneipes
- Mycological characteristics
- Gills on hymenium
- Cap is conical or convex
- Hymenium is adnate or adnexed
- Stipe is bare
- Spore print is purple-brown
- Ecology is saprotrophic
- Edibility is unknown

Mythicomyces is a fungal genus in the family Mythicomycetaceae. A monotypic genus, it contains the single species Mythicomyces corneipes, first described by Elias Fries in 1861. The fungus produces fruit bodies with shiny yellowish-orange to tawny caps that are 1–3 cm (0.4–1.2 in) in diameter. These are supported by stems measuring 2–5.7 cm (0.8–2.2 in) long and 1–2 mm thick. A rare to uncommon species, it is found in northern temperate regions of North America and Europe, where it typically fruits in groups, in wet areas of coniferous forests. There are several species with which M. corneipes might be confused due to a comparable appearance or similar range and habitat, but microscopic characteristics can be used to reliably distinguish between them.

== Taxonomy ==
The genus Mythicomyces was circumscribed in 1986 by mycologists Scott Redhead and Alexander H. Smith to contain the species originally named Agaricus corneipes by Elias Magnus Fries in 1861. Fries described the species from collections made in a fir forest near Alsike, Sweden; it was subsequently recorded in North America (northwestern USA) by Andrew Price Morgan in 1907, and several times by Smith. When listing the synonyms of the species, Redhead and Smith cited the publication year of Fries's work as 1863 instead of the correct 1861, which rendered their new combination invalid according to the rules of International Code of Botanical Nomenclature, although the generic name was valid. The binomial was subsequently published validly in 2011.

In its taxonomic history, the species has also been placed in Geophila by Lucien Quélet in 1886, and Psilocybe by Petter Karsten in 1879. Psilocybe specialist Gastón Guzmán excluded the taxon from the latter genus in his 1983 monograph, based on its roughened spores that lacked a germ pore, pale spore print, stem texture, and the tawny basal mycelium. Guzmán, who examined Smith's US collections, suggested that the material might be more appropriately considered a Galerina, but Redhead and Smith noted that several features of Mythicomyces corneipes are inconsistent with placement in Galerina, including spore print color, presence of metuloids, stem texture, and tawny basal mycelium.

Redhead and Smith placed the genus in the Strophariaceae, as the biology of the fruit bodies and spore print color fit the broad concept of that family envisaged by Robert Kühner in 1984. They noted, however, that the genus did not fit well in a more restricted concept of the family due to its lack of a germ pore and roughened spore walls. More recently, taxonomic authorities have placed the genus in the family Psathyrellaceae; molecular analysis showed it to be most closely allied to this family where Mythicomyces and Stagnicola form a clade that is sister to the rest of the family. In 2019 the family Mythicomycetaceae was recognized for the two genera, Mythicomyces and Stagnicola.

== Description ==
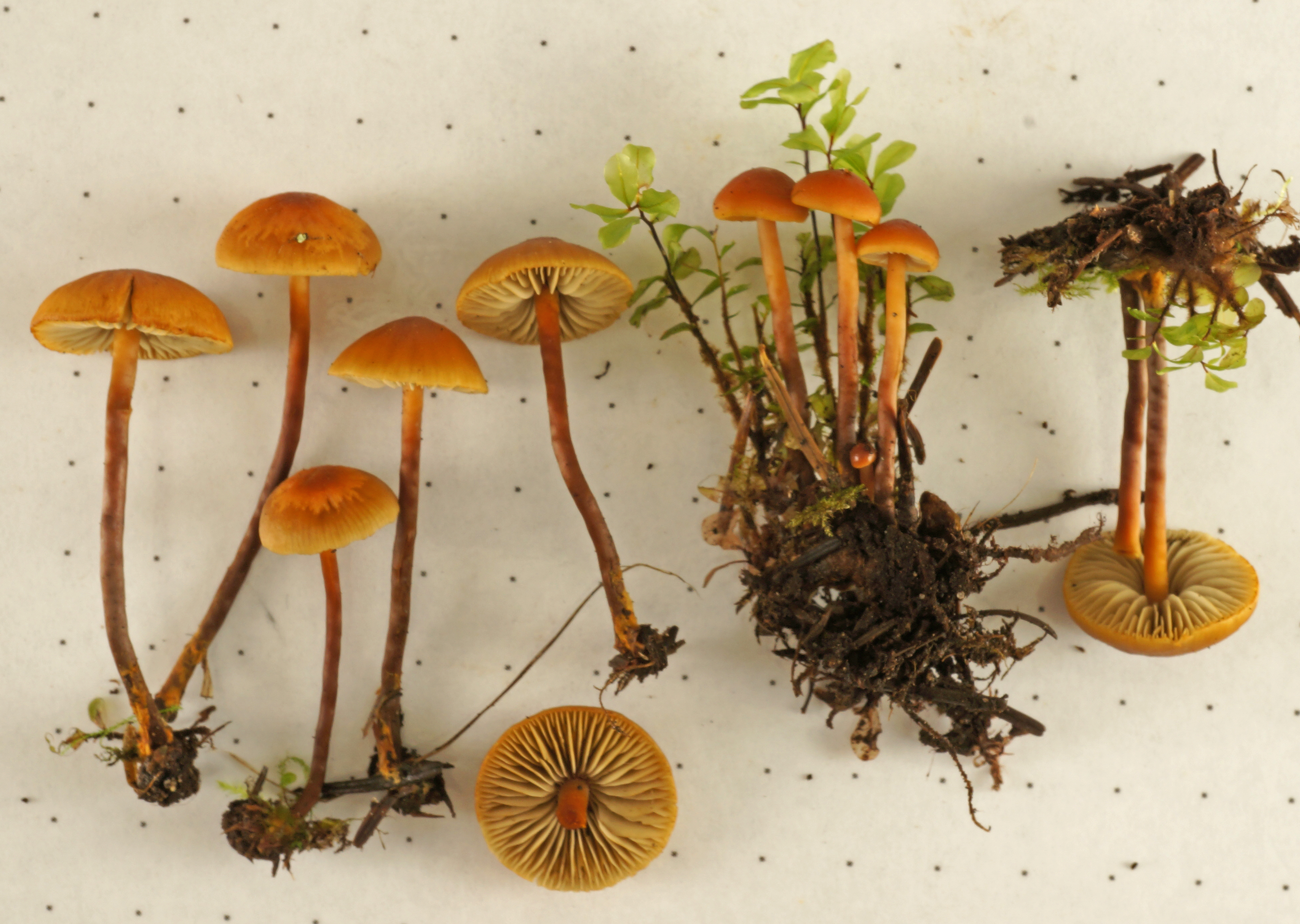
A collection from Washington, USA

The cap is initially somewhat conical with margins rolled inward, and expands to become bell-shaped or broadly convex in maturity, reaching a diameter of 1–3 cm (0.4–1.2 in). The cap sometimes has an umbo, which is rounded to conical. The color of the cap ranges from dull to bright orange when young, to yellowish-brown (tawny) in maturity. It is hygrophanous, and the color fades to yellowish-buff. The cap surface is smooth and polished, and somewhat translucent, such that the radial gill lines can be seen on the margin.

The gills are closely spaced, and have two tiers of interspersed lamellulae (short gills). Gills have an adnate to adnexed attachment to the stem, although the gills tend to secede (separate from the stem) in maturity. They are initially pallid to whitish in color before turning brownish when the spores mature.

The smooth stem measures 3–5.7 cm (1.2–2.2 in) long by 1–2 mm thick. Yellowish to pale orange near the top and dark reddish brown below, it has tawny mycelium at the base. In maturity the stem turns black from the base upward. In 1907, Morgan noted the stipe to be remarkably similar to that of Marasmius cohaerens.

The mushroom flesh has an odor that ranges from indistinct to somewhat of geraniums, while its taste is indistinct to faintly bitter. The edibility of the mushroom is unknown.

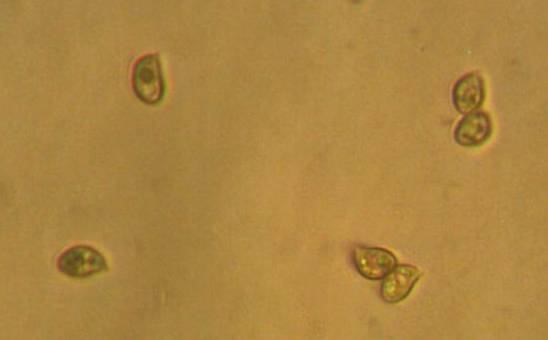
Spores

The spore print is pale purplish brown. Spores are ovoid (egg-shaped) to somewhat ellipsoidal, binucleate (visible when stained with acetocarmine solution), often contain a single oil droplet, and measure 6–8.5 by 4–5.5 μm. The spore walls are roughened with small points and ridges, and have a small plage. The basidia (spore-bearing cells) are club-shaped, four-spored, and measure 24–26 by 6–8.5 μm. Cystidia on the gill face (pleurocystidia) are abundant. They are spindle-shaped with swollen middles, and thick tips that are occasionally encrusted with translucent crystals. They have dimensions of 43–86 by 10–24 μm, with walls that are pale brown to translucent, and up to 3 μm thick. Cystidia on the gill edge (cheilocystidia) are roughly the same morphologically, but shorter. The cap cuticle comprises a layer of radially arranged gelatinized hyphae measuring 1–4 μm in diameter. Clamp connections are present in the hyphae.

=== Similar species ===
Stagnicola perplexa is similar in appearance and shares habitats and a geographical range comparable to Mythicomyces corneipes. S. perplexa generally has a more faded coloration, and produces brownish spore prints lacking purplish tones. The two species can be reliably distinguished by microscopic characteristics, as Stagnicola has smooth spores and cheilocystidia with thin walls. Owing to its similarly colored cap and habitat amongst mosses, Phaeocollybia attenuata might be confused with M. corneipes. Phaeocollybia attenuata can readily be differentiated in the field by the long wirelike pseudorhiza extending below the substrate, and microscopically by the much more heavily ornamented limoniform-globose spores and absence of pleurocystidia. Other morphologically similar species include Hypholoma udum and H. elongatum, but unlike M. corneipes, both of these agarics have smooth spores, yellow chrysocystidia, and lack metuloids. The lookalike Galerina sideroides is found in Washington, Michigan, and Sweden, where it fruits in groups on rotten conifer logs. It has distinct microscopic characteristics, such as a wider range of basidial widths (20–40 μm), and a lack of pleurocystidia.

== Habitat and distribution ==
Mythicomyces corneipes is a saprobic fungus, and uses plant debris—usually bits of wood—as a substrate. Fruit bodies appear in autumn, and grow in groups among mosses in moist habitats, such as near the edges of bogs, or under conifers or birch in soil wet from spring flooding. It has been recorded from North America, where it is most common in the Pacific Northwest region, and Europe, where it is rare, but widespread across the northern part of the continent. In 1938, Smith called the species "extremely rare".

== Etymology ==
The name Mythicomyces was coined to reflect that it possessed an anomalous combination of morphological and anatomical features that seemed to span several families of mushrooms, as if it were a mythical mushroom. Its morphological uniqueness and isolation from other mushroom families was later confirmed by molecular analyses resulting in the new family Mythicomycetaceae together with another anomalous agaric genus, Stagnicola.
