= Deconica umbrina =

Scientific classification
- Domain: Eukaryota
- Kingdom: Fungi
- Division: Basidiomycota
- Class: Agaricomycetes
- Order: Agaricales
- Family: Strophariaceae
- Genus: Deconica
- Species: D. umbrina

Binomial name
- Deconica umbrina (Petch) Ram.-Cruz & Guzmán (2012)

Synonyms
- Psilocybe umbrina E. Horak, Guzmán, & Desjardin (2009)

Species of fungus

Deconica umbrina is a species of mushroom in the family Strophariaceae.
