= Deconica goniospora =

Scientific classification
- Domain: Eukaryota
- Kingdom: Fungi
- Division: Basidiomycota
- Class: Agaricomycetes
- Order: Agaricales
- Family: Strophariaceae
- Genus: Deconica
- Species: D. goniospora

Binomial name
- Deconica goniospora (Berk. & Broome) Singer (1955)

Synonyms
- Agaricus goniosporus Berk. & Broome (1871); Flammula goniospora (Berk. & Broome) Sacc. (1887); Psilocybe goniospora (Berk. & Broome) Singer (1961); Agaricus lonchophorus Berk. & Broome (1871); Psilocybe lonchophorus (Berk. & Broome) E. Horak (1983); Psilocybe lonchophora (Berk. & Broome) E. Horak (1983)

Species of fungus

Deconica goniospora is a species of mushroom in the family Strophariaceae. It is found in Sri Lanka.
