= Deconica angustispora =

Scientific classification
- Domain: Eukaryota
- Kingdom: Fungi
- Division: Basidiomycota
- Class: Agaricomycetes
- Order: Agaricales
- Family: Strophariaceae
- Genus: Deconica
- Species: D. angustispora

Binomial name
- Deconica angustispora (A.H.Sm.) Ram.-Cruz & Guzmán (2012)

Synonyms
- Psilocybe angustispora Singer (1946)

Species of fungus

Deconica angustispora is a mushroom that was discovered in the late 1930s and formally described by A.H. Smith in 1946 as a species of Psilocybe. It is very small and has rarely been documented.
