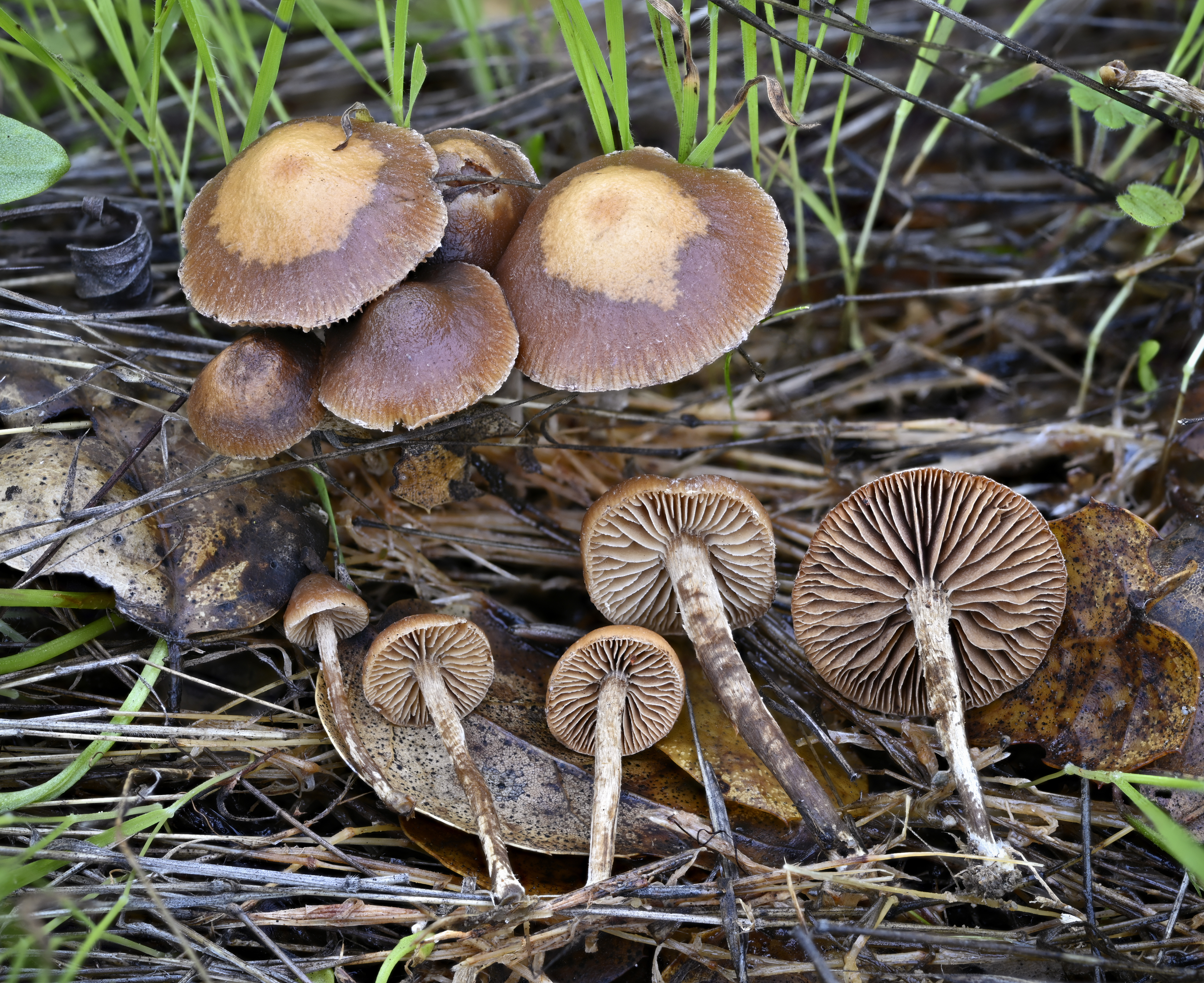

Scientific classification
- Domain: Eukaryota
- Kingdom: Fungi
- Division: Basidiomycota
- Class: Agaricomycetes
- Order: Agaricales
- Family: Strophariaceae
- Genus: Deconica
- Species: D. inquilina

Binomial name
- Deconica inquilina (Fries) Romagn.

= Deconica inquilina =

Species of fungus

Deconica inquilina Mycological characteristics
- Gills on hymenium
- Cap is convex or conical
- Hymenium is adnate or sinuate
- Stipe has a cortina
- Spore print is purple-brown
- Ecology is saprotrophic
- Edibility is unknown

Deconica inquilina is a species of mushroom in the family Strophariaceae. Formerly a member of the genus Psilocybe (well known for its psilocybin containing members), this species belonged to the non-blueing (non-hallucinogenic) clade and was consequently moved to Deconica in 2009.

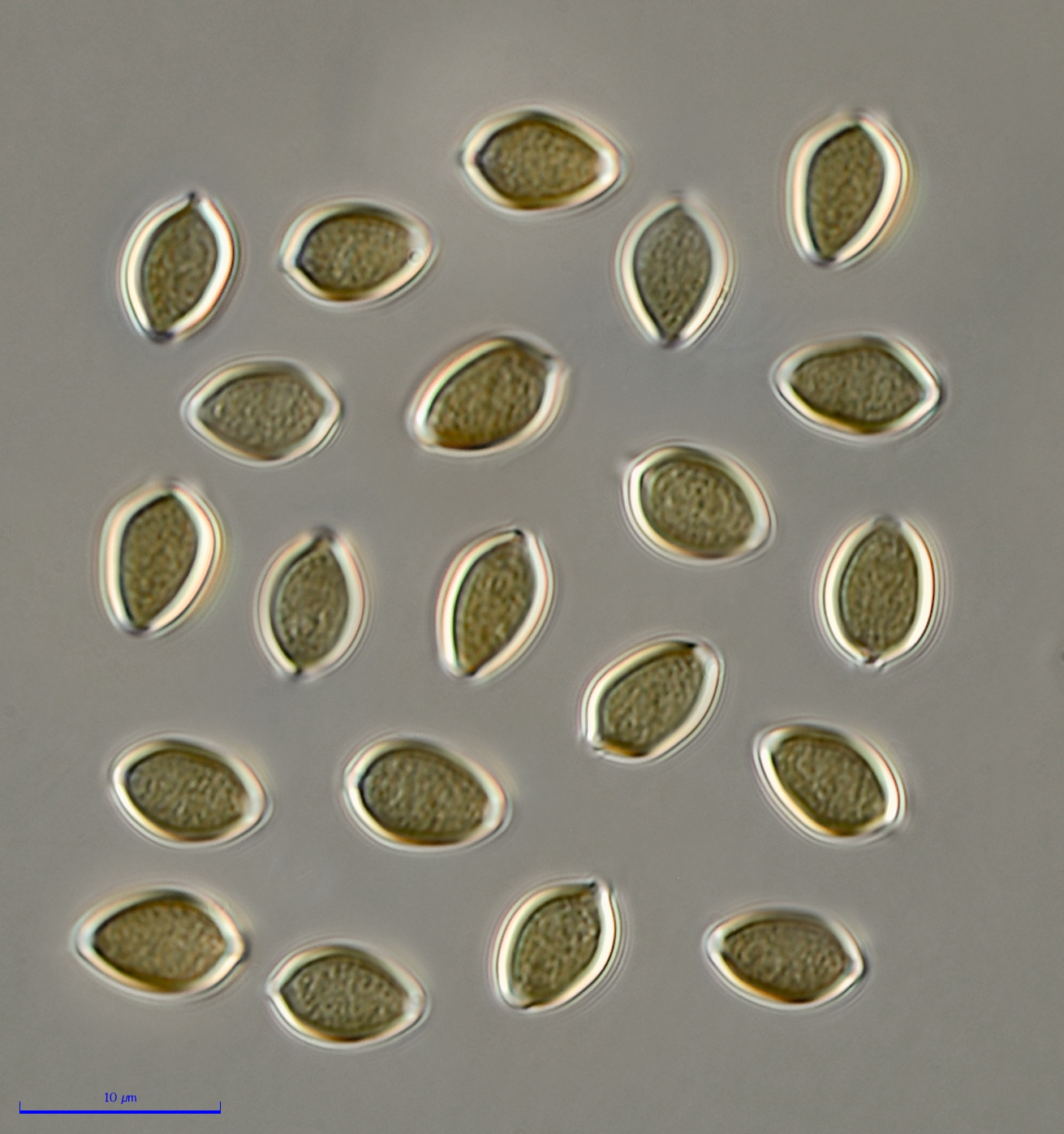
Deconica inquilina spores 1000x

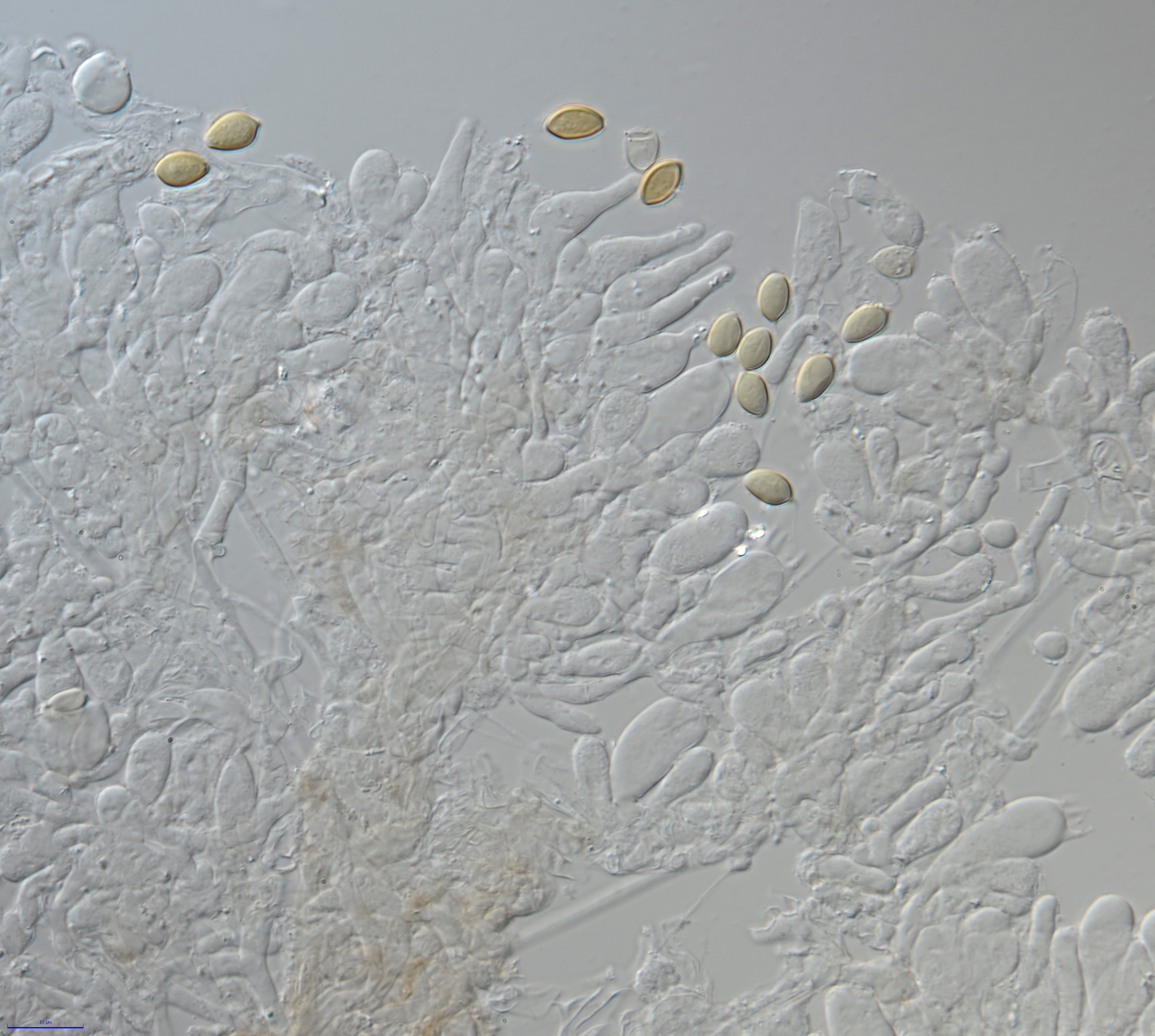
Deconica inquilina cheilocystidia 1000x

== Habitat and distribution ==
Deconica inquilina is found growing on decaying grass. It is very widely distributed, reported from North America, South America and Europe.
