= Deconica thailandensis =

Scientific classification
- Domain: Eukaryota
- Kingdom: Fungi
- Division: Basidiomycota
- Class: Agaricomycetes
- Order: Agaricales
- Family: Strophariaceae
- Genus: Deconica
- Species: D. thailandensis

Binomial name
- Deconica thailandensis (E. Horak, Guzmán, & Desjardin) Ram.-Cruz & Guzmán (2012)

Synonyms
- Psilocybe thailandensis E. Horak, Guzmán, & Desjardin (2009)

Species of fungus

Deconica thailandensis is a species of mushroom in the family Strophariaceae. It is found in Thailand.
