= Stagnicola =

Stagnicola can refer to:

- Stagnicola (fungus), a fungus genus
- Stagnicola (gastropod), a freshwater snail genus
