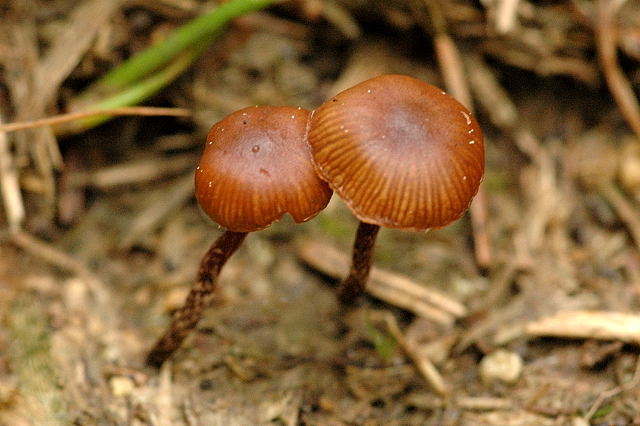
- Deconica montana

Scientific classification
- Kingdom: Fungi
- Division: Basidiomycota
- Class: Agaricomycetes
- Order: Agaricales
- Family: Strophariaceae
- Genus: Deconica (W.G.Sm.) P.Karst. (1879)

Synonyms
- Agaricus "trib." Psilocybe Fr. (1821); Delitescor Earle (1909); Galeropsina Velen. (1947)

= Deconica =

Genus of fungi

Deconica is a genus of mushroom-forming fungi in the family Strophariaceae. It was formerly considered synonymous with Psilocybe until molecular studies showed that genus to be polyphyletic, made of two major clades: one containing bluing, hallucinogenic species, the other non-bluing and non-hallucinogenic species. Deconica contains species formerly classified in the sections Deconica and Coprophila of Psilocybe.

== Taxonomy ==
Until recently, Deconica was generally considered to be synonymous with Psilocybe, and was originally named as a subgenus of Agaricus by Worthington George Smith in 1870. It was later raised to generic level by Petter Karsten in 1879. However, several molecular studies published in the 2000s demonstrated that Psilocybe, as it was defined then, was polyphyletic. The studies supported the idea of dividing the genus into two clades, one consisting of the bluing, hallucinogenic species, and the other made of the non-bluing, non-hallucinogenic species. However, the generally accepted lectotype (a specimen later selected when the original author of a taxon name did not designate a type) of the genus as a whole was Psilocybe montana, a non-hallucinogenic species; if those forms of the species in the study were to be segregated, it would leave the hallucinogenic clade without a valid name. To resolve this taxonomical dilemma, it was proposed in 2005 to conserve the name Psilocybe, with P. semilanceata as the type, leaving the option to use Deconica as the name for the non-hallucinogenic clade. The proposal was accepted unanimously by the Nomenclature Committee for Fungi in 2009. Recently, it has been reported that the non-bluing Psilocybe fuscofulva does not produce hallucinogenic compounds. Thus, non-hallucinogenic species are also covered by the genus Psilocybe, not only Deconica.

Deconica had previously been recognized as a separate genus by several authors, including Rolf Singer in 1951, Dennis and Orton in 1960, and Horak in 1979.

== Species ==
Many species in Deconica were transferred there by mycologist Machiel Noordeloos in a 2009 publication.

- Deconica aequatoriae
- Deconica alpestris
- Deconica angustispora
- Deconica argentina
- Deconica aureicystidiata
- Deconica bayliasiana
- Deconica caricicola
- Deconica castanella
- Deconica chionophila
- Deconica citrispora
- Deconica coprophila
- Deconica crobula
- Deconica eucalyptina
- Deconica flocculosa
- Deconica goniospora
- Deconica horizontalis
- Deconica hartii
- Deconica inquilina
- Deconica magica
- Deconica merdaria
- Deconica merdicola
- Deconica micropora
- Deconica moelleri
- Deconica mongolica
- Deconica montana var. macrospora
- Deconica musacearum
- Deconica novae-zelandiae
- Deconica neocaledonica
- Deconica neorhombispora
- Deconica pegleriana
- Deconica philipsii
- Deconica phyllogena
- Deconica pratense
- Deconica pseudobullacea
- Deconica rhomboidospora
- Deconica schoeneti
- Deconica semiinconspicua
- Deconica singeriana
- Deconica subcoprophila
- Deconica submaritima
- Deconica subviscida var. velata
- Deconica tenax
- Deconica thailandensis
- Deconica umbrina
- Deconica velifera
- Deconica venezuelana
- Deconica vorax
- Deconica xeroderma
