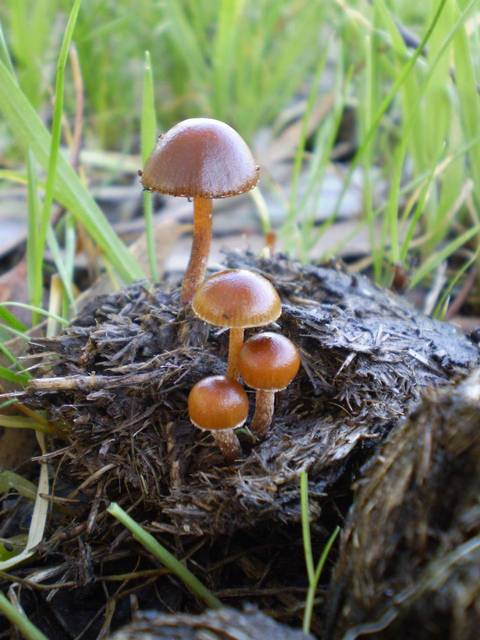

Scientific classification
- Kingdom: Fungi
- Division: Basidiomycota
- Class: Agaricomycetes
- Order: Agaricales
- Family: Strophariaceae
- Genus: Deconica
- Species: D. coprophila

Binomial name
- Deconica coprophila (Bull.) P.Karst (1821)

Synonyms
- Agaricus coprophilus Bull. (1793); Psilocybe coprophila (Bull.) P.Kumm. (1871) Stropharia coprophila (Bull.) J.E. Lange (1936)

= Deconica coprophila =

Species of fungus

Deconica coprophila
- Mycological characteristics
- Gills on hymenium
- Cap is convex
- Hymenium is adnate or decurrent
- Stipe is bare
- Spore print is purple-brown
- Ecology is saprotrophic
- Edibility is not recommended

Deconica coprophila, commonly known as the dung-loving deconia, meadow muffin mushroom, dung-loving psilocybe, or dung demon, is a species of mushroom in the family Strophariaceae.

== Taxonomy ==
First described as Agaricus coprophilus by Jean Baptiste François Pierre Bulliard in 1793, it was transferred to the genus Psilocybe by Paul Kummer in 1871.

In the first decade of the 2000s, several molecular studies showed that the Psilocybe was polyphyletic and the non-bluing (non-hallucinogenic) species were transferred to Deconica.

== Description ==
The hemispherical cap is up to 2.5 centimetres (1 in) wide, red then orangish, usually with a hygrophanous central blotch. The gills are adnate, pale then purplish with white edges.

The stem is up to 4 cm (1 1/2 in) long and 3 millimetres (1/8 in) thick and darker near the base. The spore print is purplish-brown.

=== Similar species ===
It resembles D. merdaria, Agrocybe pediades, Panaeolus cinctulus, and members of Protostropharia.

== Habitat and distribution ==
The species grows on cattle dung in much of North America (generally from July to September; December to May on the West Coast).

== Potential uses ==
While non-toxic, the species is not a good edible mushroom. Bacterial contamination from the dung habitat can cause gastrointestinal distress.
