= Deconica neocaledonica =

Scientific classification
- Kingdom: Fungi
- Division: Basidiomycota
- Class: Agaricomycetes
- Order: Agaricales
- Family: Strophariaceae
- Genus: Deconica
- Species: D. neocaledonica

Binomial name
- Deconica neocaledonica (E. Horak & Guzmán) Ram.-Cruz & Guzmán (2013)

Synonyms
- Psilocybe neocaledonica E. Horak & Guzmán (1979); Naematoloma neocaledonicum (E. Horak & Guzmán) Guzmán (1980); Hypholoma neocaledonicum (E. Horak & Guzmán) Guzmán (1999); Psilocybe overeemii E. Horak & Desjardin (2006)

Species of fungus

Deconica neocaledonica is a species of mushroom in the family Strophariaceae. It has been found in New Caledonia and in Mount Halimun Salak National Park in Java, Indonesia. It is very similar to Deconica aureicystidiata.
