= Deconica aequatoriae =

Scientific classification
- Domain: Eukaryota
- Kingdom: Fungi
- Division: Basidiomycota
- Class: Agaricomycetes
- Order: Agaricales
- Family: Strophariaceae
- Genus: Deconica
- Species: D. aequatoriae

Binomial name
- Deconica aequatoriae (Singer) Ram.-Cruz & Guzmán (2012)

Synonyms
- Psilocybe aequatoriae Singer (1978)

Species of fungus

Deconica aequatoriae is a species of mushroom in the family Strophariaceae found in Ecuador.
