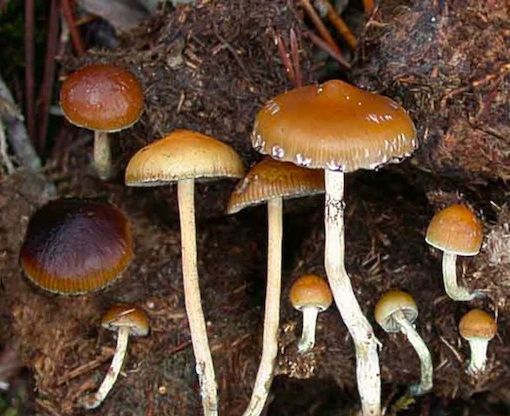

Scientific classification
- Kingdom: Fungi
- Division: Basidiomycota
- Class: Agaricomycetes
- Order: Agaricales
- Family: Hymenogastraceae
- Genus: Psilocybe
- Species: P. fimetaria

Binomial name
- Psilocybe fimetaria (P.D. Orton) Watling (1967)

Synonyms
- Stropharia fimetaria P.D.Orton (1964)

= Psilocybe fimetaria =

Species of fungus

Psilocybe fimetaria
- Mycological characteristics
- Gills on hymenium
- Cap is convex or umbonate
- Hymenium is adnexed or free
- Stipe has a cortina
- Spore print is blackish-brown to purple
- Ecology is saprotrophic
- Edibility is unknown

Psilocybe fimetaria is a dung-loving mushroom, usually found on horse dung. Along with Psilocybe fuscofulva, it is one of two Psilocybe mushroom species that has been found to contain no detectable levels of the psychoactive indole alkaloid psilocybin, In the case of P. fimetaria, this may be due to some individual specimens having a very low concentration, or the species actually being a pair of morphologically similar species.

== Etymology ==
- From the Latin word 'fĭmus', meaning dung, excretement or manure, and the standard Latin suffix '-arius', meaning engaged-in or structured.

== Description ==
- Cap: 0.5 — 3.5 cm in diameter, papillate to convex, becoming umbonate to broadly convex in age. Surface even to translucent-striate near the margin, viscid when moist from a thick separable gelatinous pellicle. Often velar remnants on surface, typically around the margin. Pale reddish brown to ochraceous, hygrophanous, fading in drying to yellowish olive to ochraceous buff. Flesh whitish to honey colored.
- Gills: Adnexed, free or sinuate. Close, interleaving and ventricose. Whitish clay at first, eventually dark reddish brown with olivaceous hue, white fimbriate.
- Spore Print: Dark purple-brown, (9.5)12.5 — 15(16) x 6.5 — 9.5 μm, ovoid in front view, ellipsoid in side view, thick walled with a broad germ pore.
- Stipe: 2 – 9 cm long by (0.5)2 – 4 mm thick. Cylindrical, flexuous, equal but sometimes slightly swollen at the base. Whitish at first, soon discolouring yellow to yellowish brown from handling, reddish brown or honey brown in age, sometimes with distinctive blue tones at the base. Surface covered with whitish fibrils towards the apex, with an apical evanescent fibrillose annulus that develops from a thickly cortinate partial veil.
- Odor: Farinaceous
- Taste: Farinaceous
- Microscopic features: Basidia 4-spored. Pleurocystidia absent. Cheilocystidia (15)20 — 30(35) by (4)6 — 8(9) μm, ventricose-fusiform or lageniform with a narrow neck, often flexuous, 4 — 15 by 0.5 — 1.5 μm, occasionally branched.

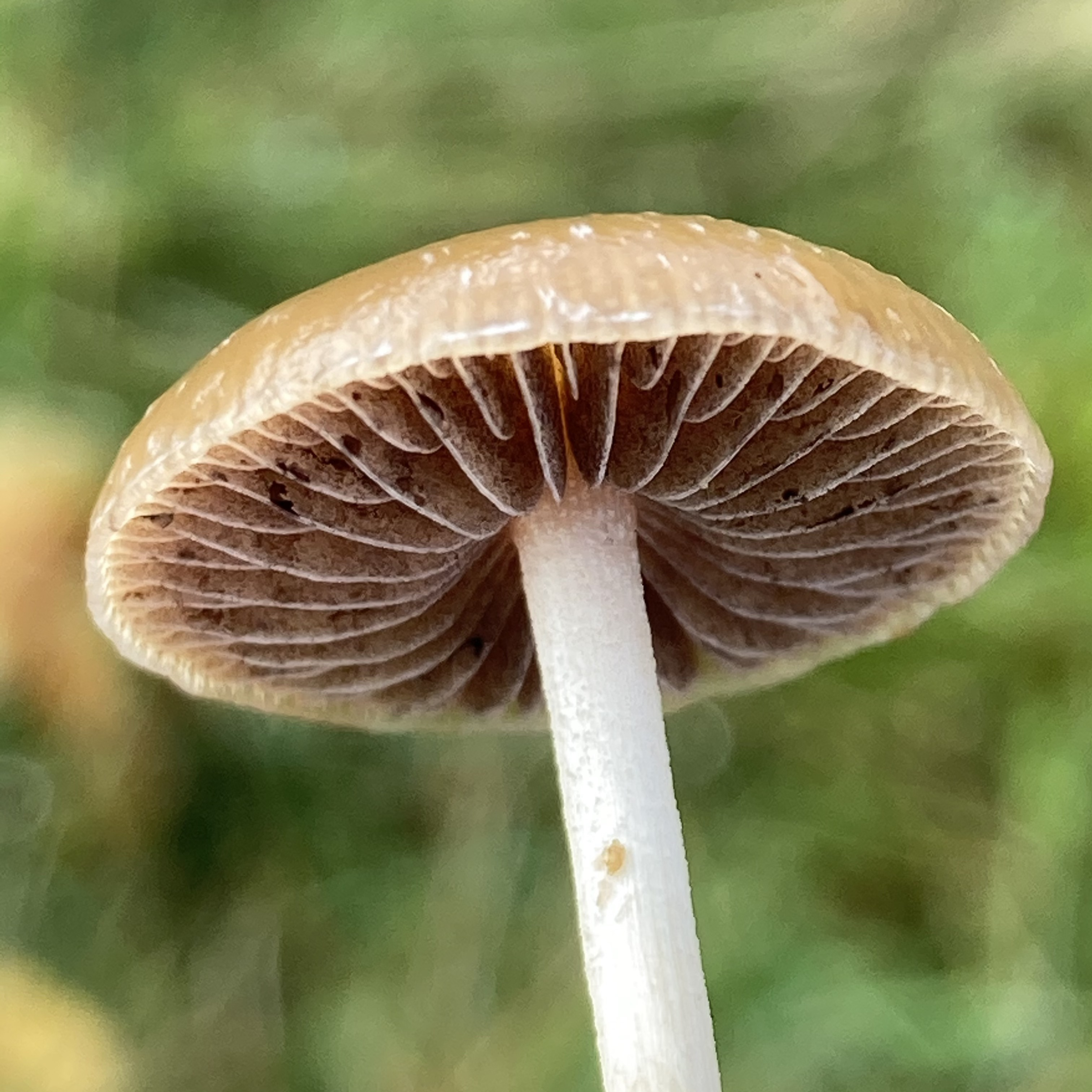
The gills of P. fimetaria are adnexed or freely attached, curving up before meeting the top of the stem

== Habitat and distribution ==
P. fimetaria is found growing solitary or in small groups on horse or cow dung, in grassy areas, in Autumn from September to November. The species is generally uncommon and infrequently recorded, but it can occasionally occur in large numbers in localized areas. Psilocybe semilanceata may be an indicator species for P. fimetaria, as they both favour similar grasses, soil types and climatic conditions.

It has been recorded in Great Britain, Iceland and much of mainland Europe. Despite what much of the literature states, there have not been confirmed recordings of P. fimetaria in Asia or the Americas (Canada, the Pacific Northwest and Chile). However, Paul Stamets suggests that the actual range in which these mushrooms fruit is likely much wider than what has been documented so far.

== Similar species ==
Psilocybe fimetaria may be visually confused with the similarly hemispherically capped species Deconica coprophila and Psilocybe liniformans or Psilocybe semilanceata as they often grow in the same habitat and share macroscopic similarities.

P. fimetaria is phylogenetically closely related to P. liniformans but can be differentiated by the latter’s separable gelatinous gill edge, which is a peelable gelatinous threads running along the bottom edge of the gills. Additionally, P. fimetaria has a distinct veil on its cap. D. coprophila can also appear similar but can be distinguished by its adnate or subdecurrent gill attachment, less dense gill spacing, and its cap being a deeper red color. Furthermore, confusion with P. semilanceata is possible, as P. fimetaria can sometimes be conic-shaped, though generally not as sharply conical as the distinctive shape of P. semilanceata. Additionally, P. semilanceata prefers cow and sheep pastures but does not directly grow on dung, unlike P. fimetaria.

== Gallery ==
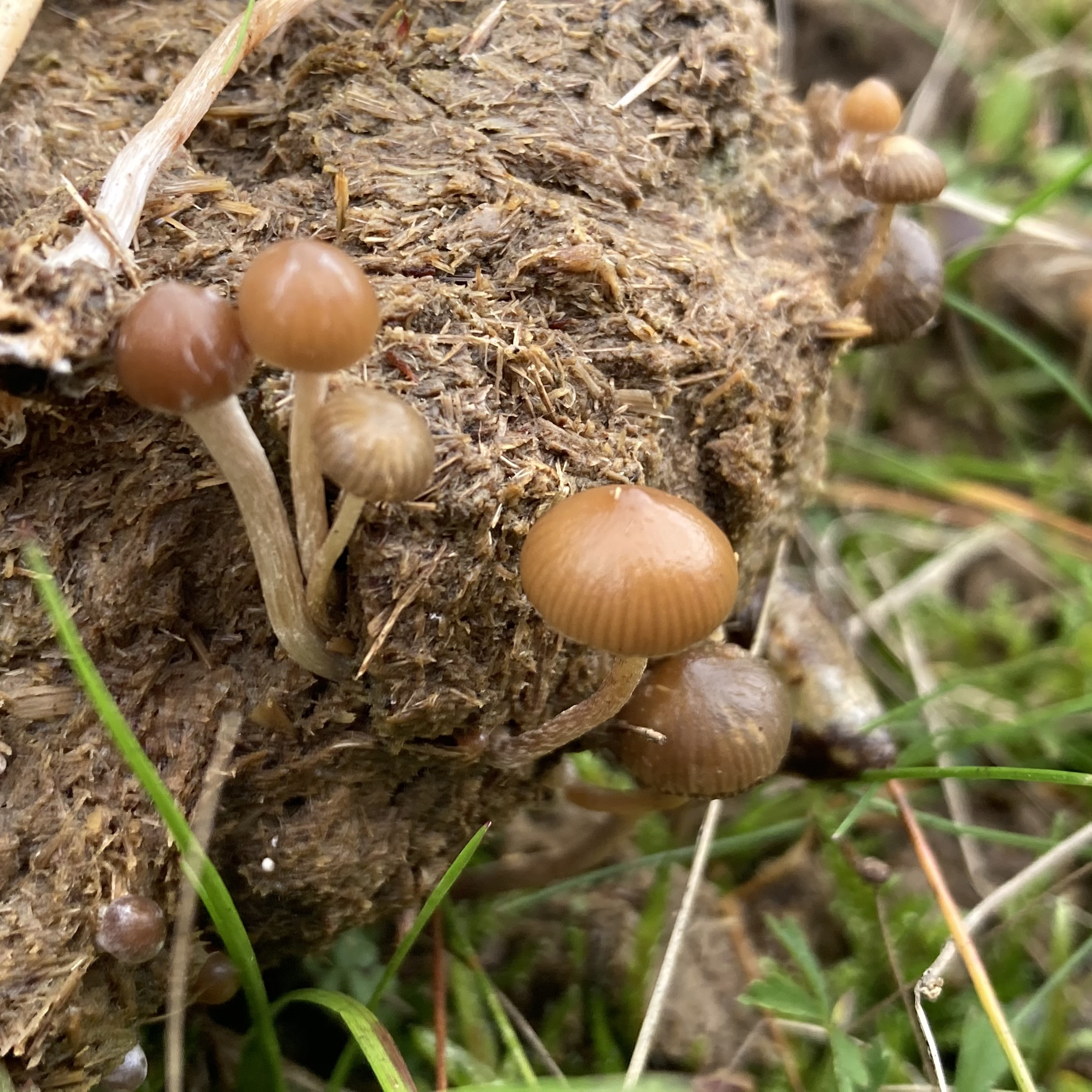
P. fimetaria at various stages of development

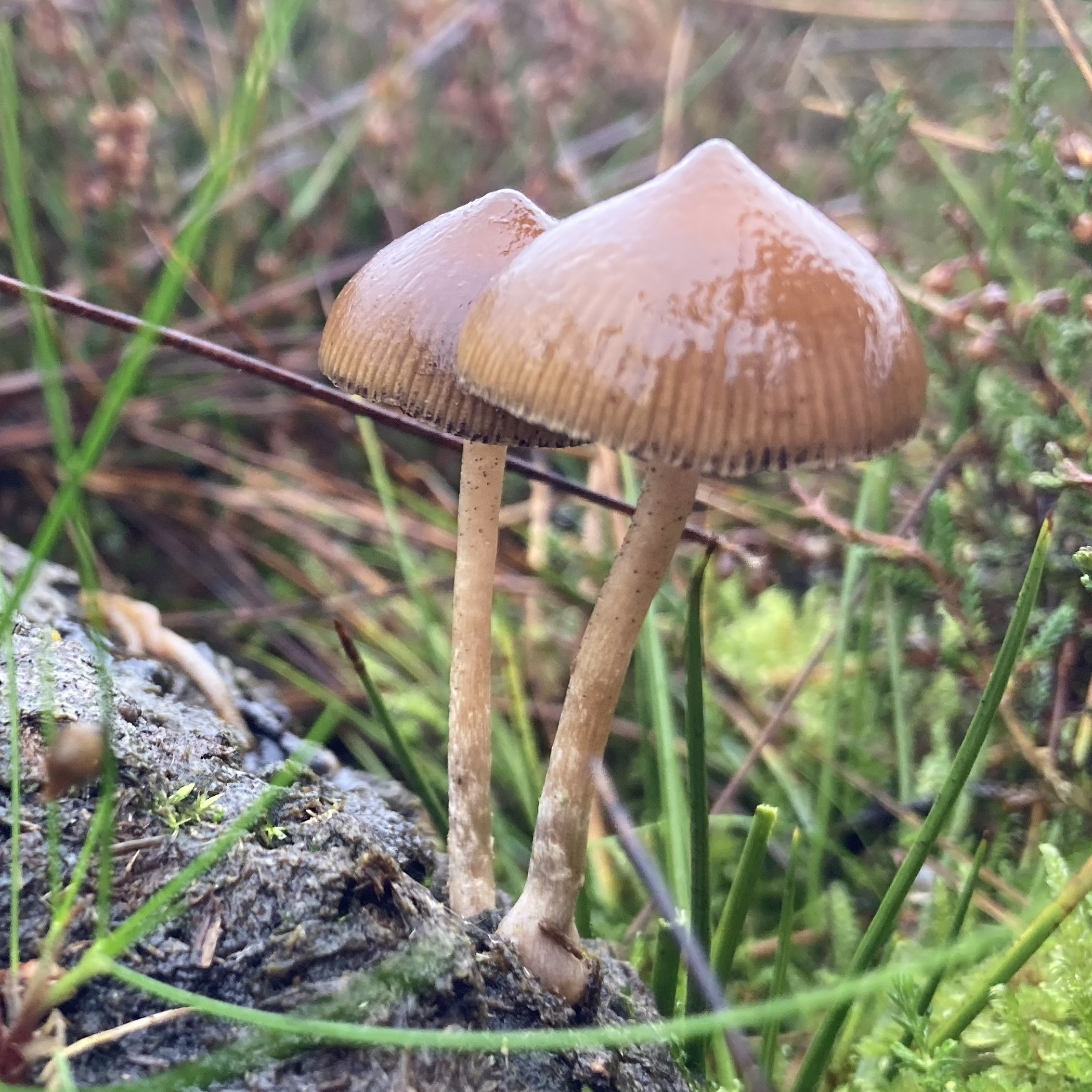
Two P. fimetaria on dung amongst heather

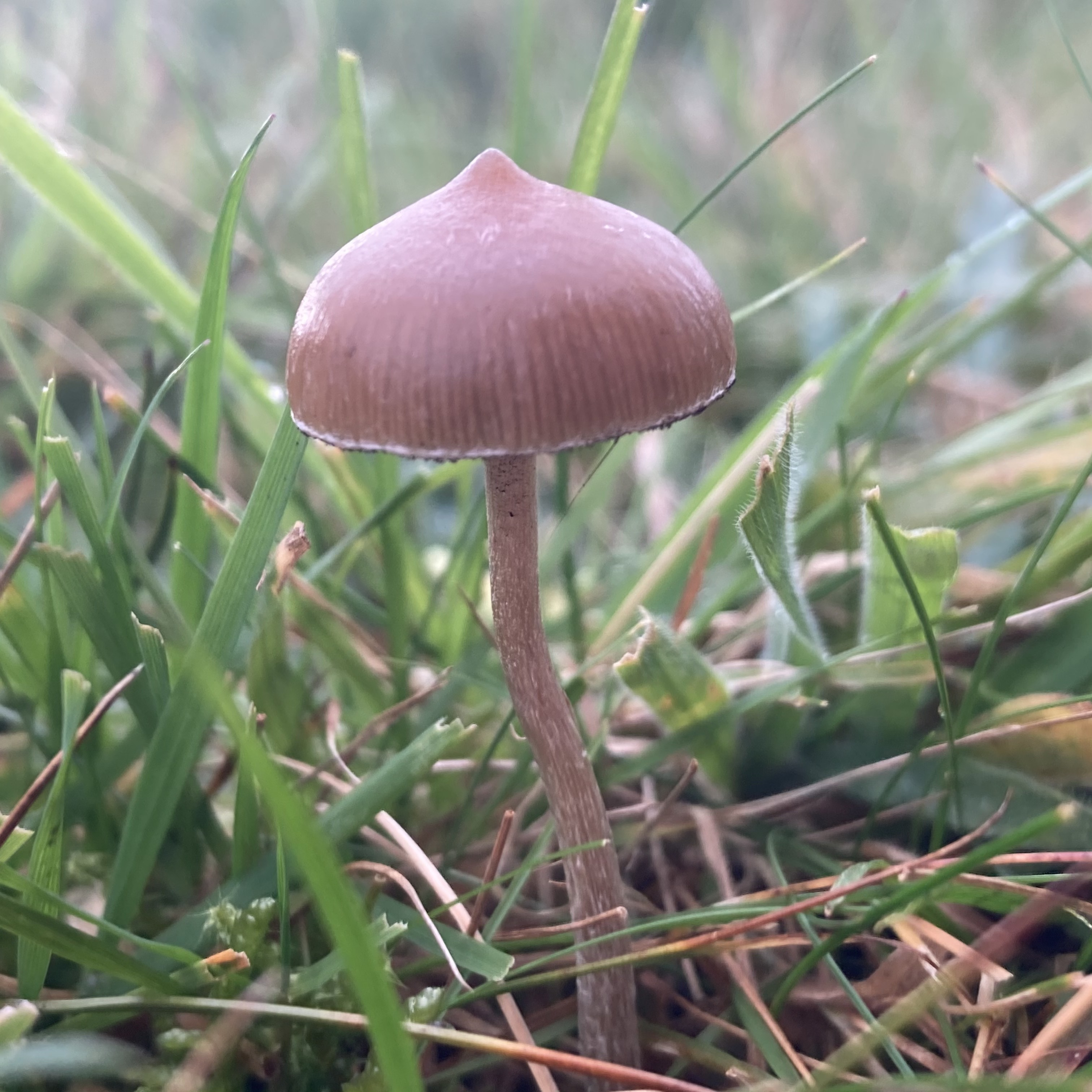
Single P.fimetaria with sharp papilla

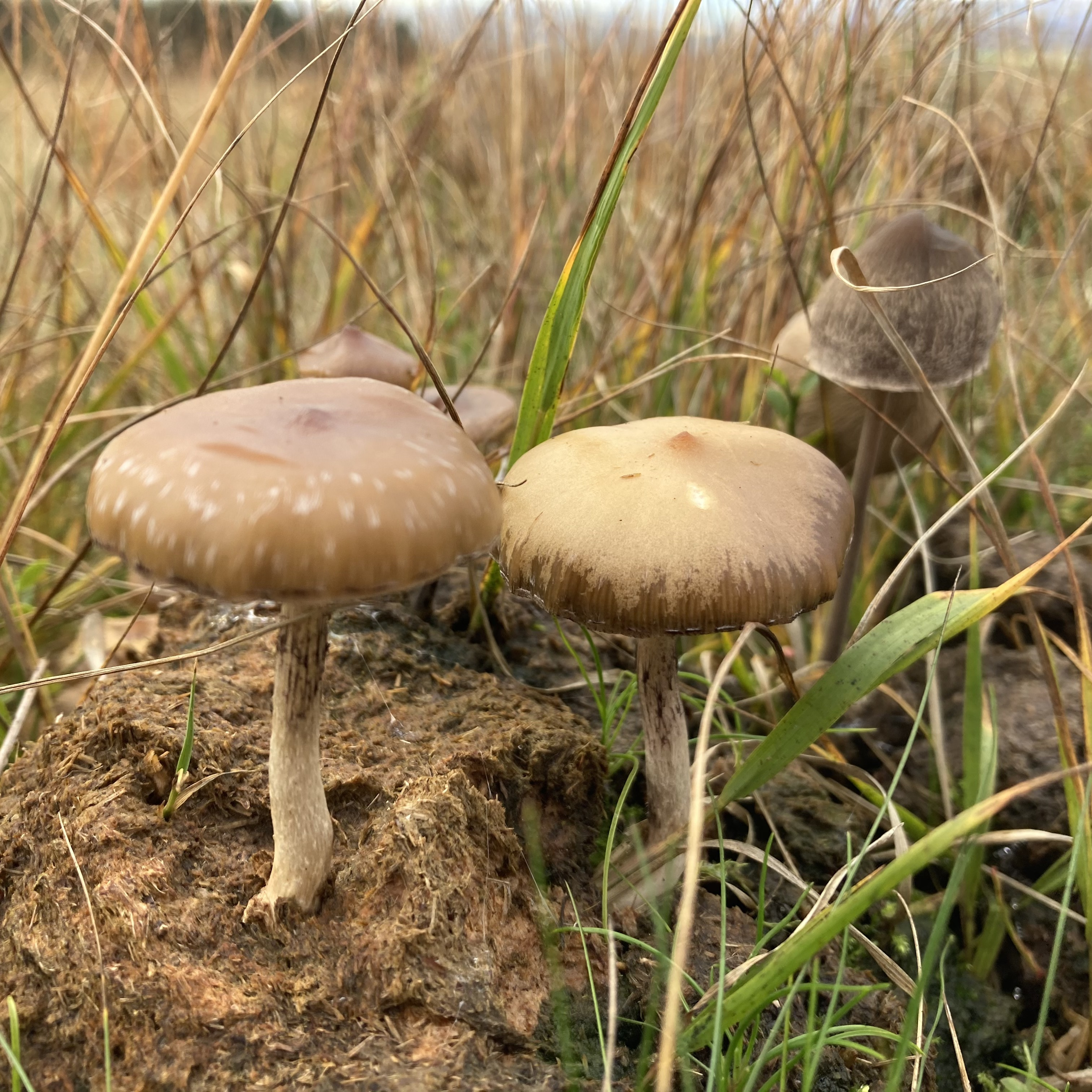
Two P. fimetaria with Panaeolus papilionaceus behind

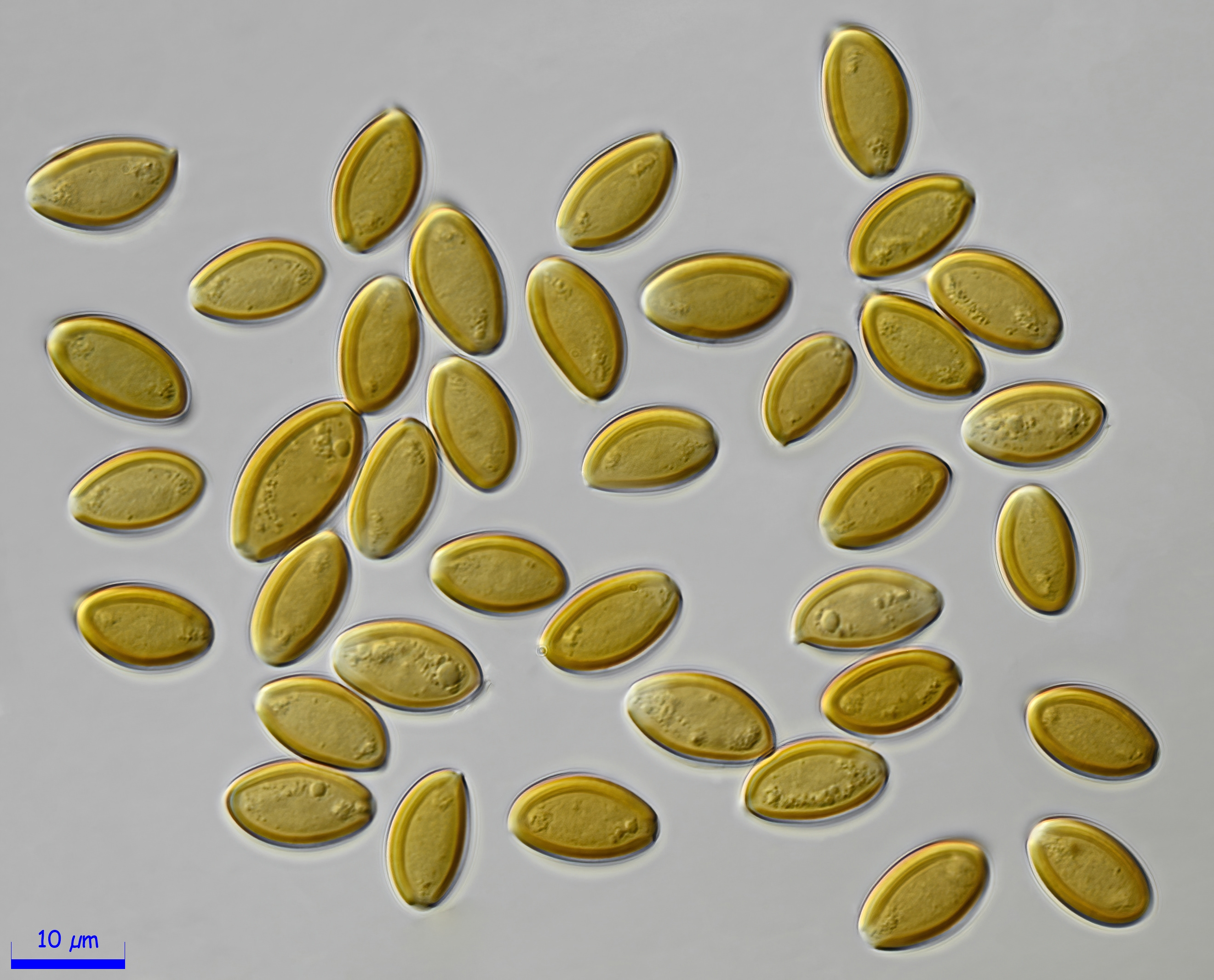
P. fimetaria spores 1000x
