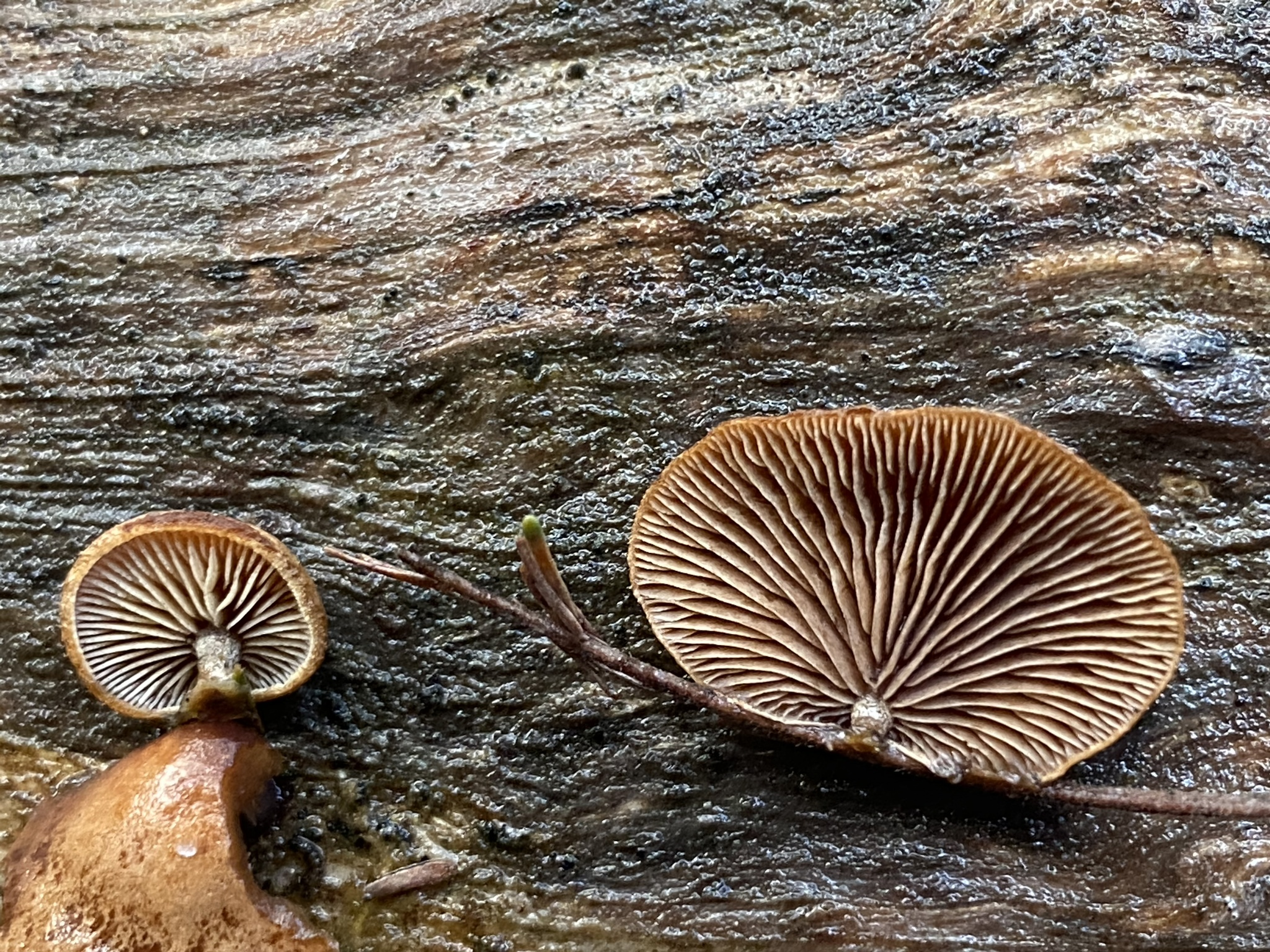
- Deconica horizontalis

Scientific classification
- Kingdom: Fungi
- Division: Basidiomycota
- Class: Agaricomycetes
- Order: Agaricales
- Family: Strophariaceae
- Genus: Deconica
- Species: D. horizontalis

Binomial name
- Deconica horizontalis (Bull.) Noordel. (2009)

Synonyms
- Agaricus horizontalis Bull. (1788)

= Deconica horizontalis =

Species of fungus

Deconica horizontalis is a species of agaric fungus in the family Strophariaceae.

== Description ==
The fruit bodies are kidney-shaped when viewed from above. The short stipe is usually off-center. Cap, stipe, and lamellae are brownish in color. In Europe, it typically grows in autumn and winter on hardwood, rarely on conifer wood, and sometimes even on coconut mats, paper, cardboard, etc. A fungus found on old textiles named Melanotus textilis can be considered its synonym.
