= Brauniella =

Scientific classification
- Kingdom: Fungi
- Division: Basidiomycota
- Class: Agaricomycetes
- Order: Agaricales
- Family: Strophariaceae
- Genus: Brauniella; Rick ex Singer (1955)

Type species
- Brauniella alba (Rick) Rick ex Singer (1955)

Synonyms
- Braunia alba Rick (1934)

Genus of fungi

Brauniella is an agaric fungal genus in the family Strophariaceae. The only species in the genus is Brauniella alba, a species first described as Braunia alba by Brazilian mycologist Johannes Rick in 1934. Braunia is an illegitimate homonym of an earlier name, so Rolf Singer circumscribed Brauniella to contain the fungus in 1955.

== See also ==
- List of Agaricales genera
