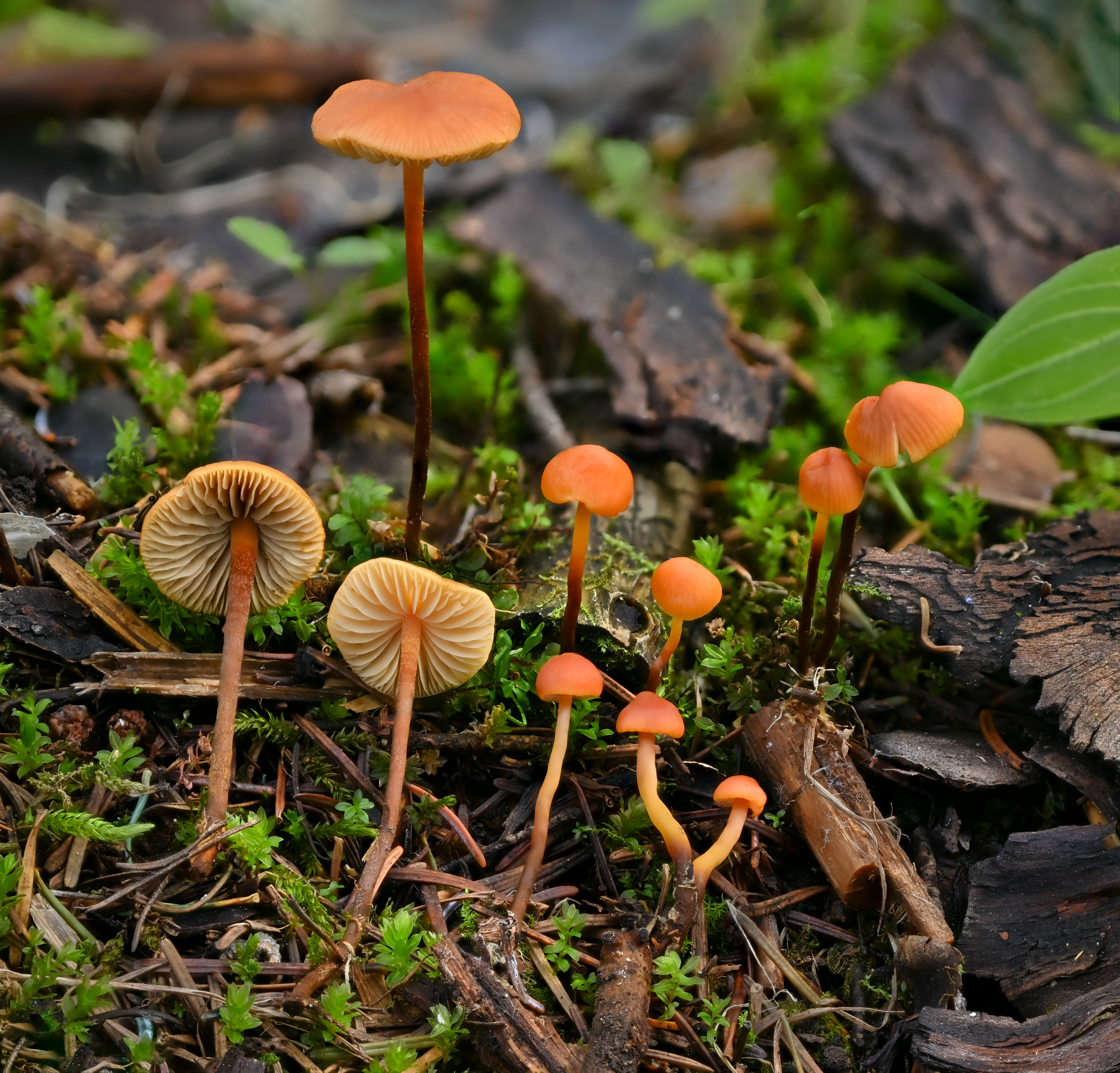
- Mythicomyces

Scientific classification
- Kingdom: Fungi
- Division: Basidiomycota
- Class: Agaricomycetes
- Order: Agaricales
- Family: Mythicomycetaceae; Vizzini, Consiglio & M. Marchetti (2019)

Type genus
- Mythicomyces Redhead & A.H. Sm. (1986)

Genera
- Mythicomyces Redhead & A.H. Sm. (1986); Stagnicola Redhead & A.H. Sm. (1986)

= Mythicomycetaceae =

Family of fungi

The Mythicomycetaceae is a family of dark-spored agarics that have palely pigmented spores which lack germ pores. The two genera are monotypic and share features such as horn-like dark stems, pigmented mycelium at their bases, and are small brown mushrooms in north temperate forests. The family is closely related to the Psathyrellaceae.
