= Deconica aureicystidiata =

Scientific classification
- Kingdom: Fungi
- Division: Basidiomycota
- Class: Agaricomycetes
- Order: Agaricales
- Family: Strophariaceae
- Genus: Deconica
- Species: D. aureicystidiata

Binomial name
- Deconica aureicystidiata (E. Horak & Desjardin) Ram.-Cruz & Guzmán (2013)

Synonyms
- Psilocybe aureicystidiata E. Horak & Desjardin (2006)

Species of fungus

Deconica aureicystidiata is a species of mushroom in the family Strophariaceae. It has been found in Mount Halimun Salak National Park and Gunung Gede Pangrango National Park in Java, Indonesia.
