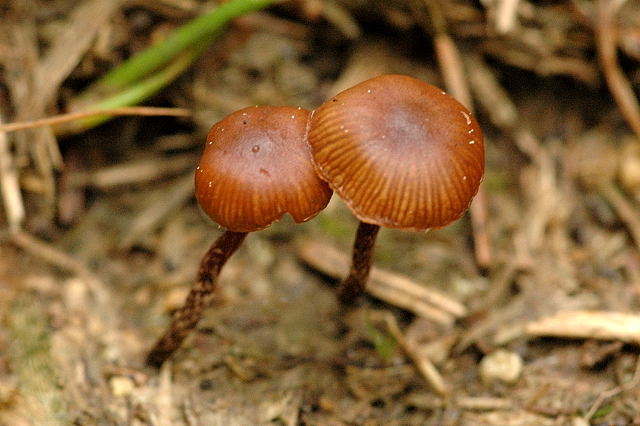

Scientific classification
- Kingdom: Fungi
- Division: Basidiomycota
- Class: Agaricomycetes
- Order: Agaricales
- Family: Strophariaceae
- Genus: Deconica
- Species: D. montana

Binomial name
- Deconica montana (Pers.) P.D. Orton (1960)

Synonyms
- Psilocybe montana

= Deconica montana =

Species of fungus

Deconica montana
- Mycological characteristics
- Gills on hymenium
- Cap is convex
- Hymenium is adnate
- Stipe is bare
- Spore print is purple-brown
- Ecology is saprotrophic
- Edibility is inedible

Deconica montana, commonly known as the moss-loving deconia or mountain moss psilocybe, is a common species of mushroom. Its appearance is that of a typical "little brown mushroom" with a small, brown cap and a straight, thin stipe. It usually grows in mossy and montane regions around the world.

== Taxonomy ==
Psilocybe montana was formerly the type species of the mushroom genus Psilocybe. Because it does not contain hallucinogenic tryptamine derivatives like psilocybin or psilocin, it does not stain blue when handled, unlike other typical hallucinogenic members of this genus. Molecular studies in the late 2000s revealed that the genus was polyphyletic and consisted of two distinct clades separating the blueing species from the non-blueing species. Dividing the genus is problematic as the name Psilocybe was attached to P. montana and consequently to the non-blueing clade, leaving the hallucinogenic species without a generic name. Because the name is widely associated with the hallucinogenic species and considering the potential legal ramifications of changing their generic name, a proposal was made to conserve the name Psilocybe with P. semilanceata as the type. This left Deconica available as a name for the non-blueing species. The proposal was unanimously accepted by the Nomenclature Committee for Fungi in 2009.

== Description ==
The cap is 0.5–2 cm in diameter, dome-shaped then convex or somewhat flat, sometimes with a broad umbo. The cap is moist, glabrous, hygrophanous, and has radial striations to the center; the color is reddish-brown to dark-brown. The gills are adnate to broadly adnate or sometimes very shortly decurrent, and of the same color as the cap. The stipe is 1.5–4 cm long, 1–2 mm thick, smooth, the same color as the cap, and brittle. The spores are typically 7.5–10 × 6–8 × 5–5.5 μm and ovate–lentiform in shape with a thickened wall. A large spored variety (spore dimensions of 8.5–11 × 6.0–8.5 × 5.0–7.0 μm), Psilocybe montana var. macrospora Noordel. & Verduin (1999), has also been reported from the Netherlands. The spore print is dark greyish brown.

It is listed as inedible, being too small to be of interest.

== Habitat and distribution ==
The species is commonly found in exposed situations such as dune-meadows, heaths and tree-less tundra, and open Pinus forests, usually on nutrient-poor, well-drained soil.

It has a worldwide, almost cosmopolitan distribution and has been reported from a variety of regions in a wide range of climates, including:

- Britain (Thetford Forest)
- California, United States
- the Caribbean
- China (western Kunlun Mountains)
- Colombia (high plains of Guasca)
- Greenland
- Mexico
- Nepal
- Norway
- in alpine tundra as well as subalpine regions in Switzerland
- in the region formerly known as the Soviet Union
- in the Venezuelan Andes and
- in moss at high elevations in Idaho and Montana
- in Arctic tundra.

They have also been reported growing in Chemnitz, Germany, on vegetation-covered flat roofs.

== Ecology ==
Deconica montana is saprobic, possibly also parasitic. It is often associated with mosses such as Brachythecium albicans, B. mutabulum, Campylopus introflexus, Ceratodon purpureus, Dicranum scoparium, Eurhynchium hians, E. praelongum, E. speciosum, Rhacomitrium canescens, Pohlia species or Polytrichum piliferum.

D. montana on moss

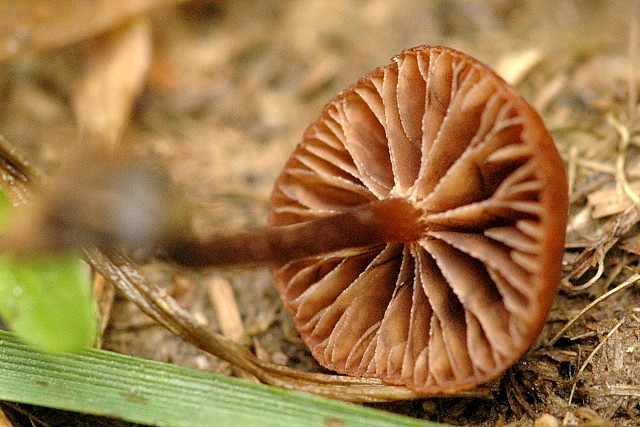
Deconica montana
