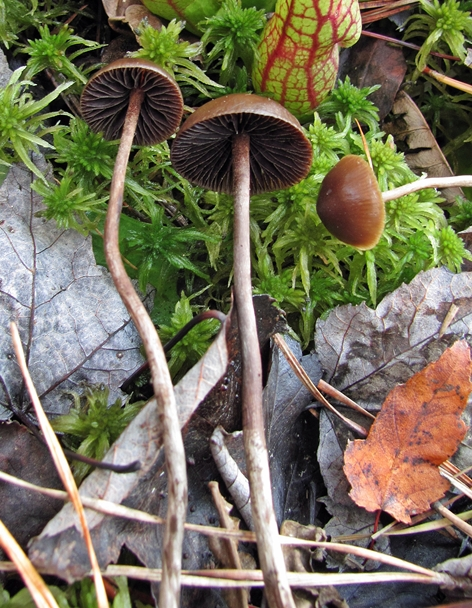

Scientific classification
- Kingdom: Fungi
- Division: Basidiomycota
- Class: Agaricomycetes
- Order: Agaricales
- Family: Hymenogastraceae
- Genus: Psilocybe
- Species: P. fuscofulva

Binomial name
- Psilocybe fuscofulva Peck (1887)

Synonyms
- Psilocybe nigrella Peck (1910); Psilocybe turficola Favre (1939); Psilocybe atrobrunnea sensu auct, non Singer (1986)

= Psilocybe fuscofulva =

Species of fungus

Psilocybe fuscofulva
- Mycological characteristics
- Gills on hymenium
- Cap is convex or umbonate
- Hymenium is adnexed or free
- Spore print is blackish-brown to purple
- Edibility is unknown

Psilocybe fuscofulva is a species of mushroom in that grows on Sphagnum moss and rarely decaying wood in peat bogs in North America and Europe. It, alongside Psilocybe fimetaria, are the only species of Psilocybe that have been found with no psilocybin or psilocin content. The phylogenetic placement indicates a close relationship to Psilocybe silvatica and Psilocybe semilanceata. It was previously most commonly known as Psilocybe atrobrunnea but the holotype does not exist and the neotype of this species was lost, so Psilocybe fuscofulva, which was previously regarded as a synonym but has a holotype, was resurrected to replace it.

Edibility is unknown, likely inedible.

== See also ==
- List of Psilocybe species
