= Stagnicola (fungus) =

Scientific classification
- Kingdom: Fungi
- Division: Basidiomycota
- Class: Agaricomycetes
- Order: Agaricales
- Family: Mythicomycetaceae
- Genus: Stagnicola; Redhead & A.H.Sm. (1986)

Type species
- Stagnicola perplexa (P.D.Orton) Redhead & A.H.Sm. (1986)

Synonyms
- Phaeocollybia perplexa P.D.Orton (1977); Naucoria cidaris var. minor (Fr.) Sacc. (1887); Simocybe parvispora Bandala, Esteve-Rav. & Montoya (2008)

Genus of fungi

Stagnicola is an agaric fungal genus that contains the single species Stagnicola perplexa. This fungus colonizes plant debris in wet coniferous forest floor depressions and shallow pools, and fruits after the pools drain or dry in late summer to early fall in North America (Canada, USA) and Europe. The genus is characterized by smooth, yellowish brown basidiospores lacking a germ pore, and a naucorioid appearance, with brownish mycelium at the base of the stems. Phylogenetically, Stagnicola appeared rather isolated and proved to be closest to Mythicomyces and Mythicomyces was closest to the Psathyrellaceae. In 2019 the two genera were shown to be closely related and placed in a new family, Mythicomycetaceae sister to the Psathyrellaceae.

Stagnicola perplexa is considered to be a rare fungus and is on list of rare mushrooms in the Pacific Northwest of the USA and in Europe.

== Etymology ==
The name Stagnicola refers to colonizing (-cola) of its habitat, stagnant pools. When the authors coined the name, they were unaware of a genus of snails with the same name, Stagnicola. The International Code of Zoological Nomenclature is independent of the International Code of Nomenclature for algae, fungi, and plants, and therefore both the snail and mushroom generic names are valid and available.
