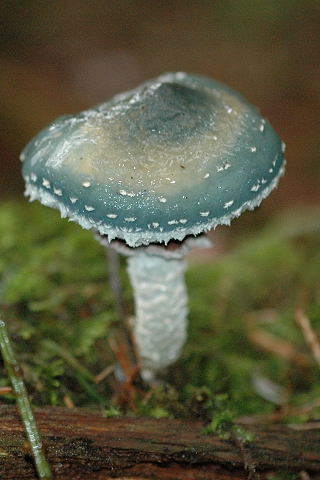
- Stropharia aeruginosa

Scientific classification
- Kingdom: Fungi
- Division: Basidiomycota
- Class: Agaricomycetes
- Order: Agaricales
- Family: Strophariaceae; Singer & A.H.Sm. (1946)

Type genus
- Stropharia (Fr.) Quél. (1872)

Genera
- Agrocybe; Bogbodia; Brauniella; Deconica; Hebelomina; Hemipholiota; Hypholoma; Kuehneromyces; Leratiomyces; Pachylepyrium; Phaeogalera; Phaeonematoloma; Pholiota; Protostropharia; Pseudogymnopilus; Pyrrhulomyces; Stagnicola; Stropharia; Weraroa

= Strophariaceae =

Family of fungi

The Strophariaceae are a family of fungi in the order Agaricales. Under an older classification, the family covered 18 genera and 1316 species. The species of Strophariaceae have red-brown to dark brown spore prints, while the spores themselves are smooth and have an apical germ pore. These agarics are also characterized by having a cutis-type pileipellis. Ecologically, all species in this group are saprotrophs, growing on various kinds of decaying organic matter. The family was circumscribed in 1946 by mycologists Rolf Singer and Alexander H. Smith.

== Genera ==
- The genus Stropharia mainly consists of medium to large agarics with a distinct membranous annulus. Spore-print color is generally medium to dark purple-brown, except for a few species with rusty-brown spores. There is a great deal of variation, however, since this group, as presently delimited, is polyphyletic. Members of the core clade of Stropharia are characterized by crystalline acanthocytes among the hyphae that make up the rhizoids at the base of the mushroom.
- The genus Hypholoma (formerly Naematoloma) is mainly a saprobe on wood and often grows in caespitose clusters. Spore print varies from medium brown to purple brown. These species all share a subcutaneous layer of inflated cells.
- The genus Pholiota is characterized by a dull brown to cinnamon brown spore print. A well-known edible species is the Japanese nameko mushroom (Pholiota nameko). A secotioid form of Pholiota was previously recognized as a distinct genus, Nivatogastrium.
- The genus Psilocybe is well known for its psychedelic mushrooms and used to be classified in the Strophariaceae, but is now separated from the nonhallucinogenic species that remain in the family under the name Deconica. Psilocybe is now phylogenetically classified in the Hymenogastraceae.
- The genus Deconica largely consists of species of agarics previously classified as nonhallucinogenic Psilocybe and also of species formerly called Melanotus.

== See also ==
- List of Agaricales families
