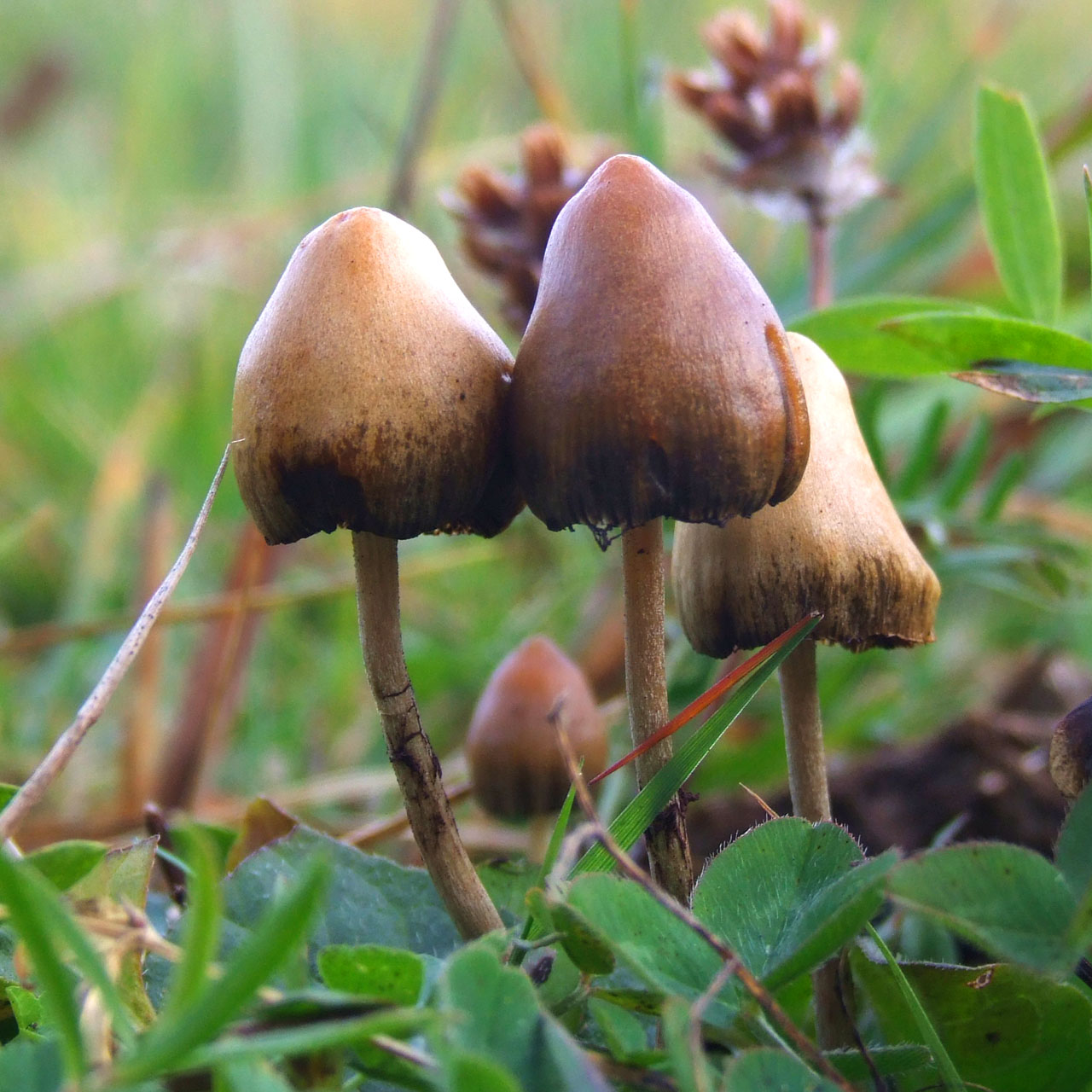
- Psilocybe semilanceata

Scientific classification
- Kingdom: Fungi
- Division: Basidiomycota
- Class: Agaricomycetes
- Order: Agaricales
- Family: Hymenogastraceae
- Genus: Psilocybe (Fr.) P.Kumm. (1871)

Type species
- Psilocybe semilanceata (Fr.) P.Kumm. (1871)

Species
- List of Psilocybe species

Synonyms
- Agaricus "trib." Psilocybe Fr. (1821)

= Psilocybe =

Genus of fungi

Psilocybe (/ˌsaɪloʊˈsaɪbi/ SY-loh-SY-bee) is a genus of gilled mushrooms, growing worldwide, in the family Hymenogastraceae. Many species contain the psychedelic prodrug psilocybin.

== Description ==
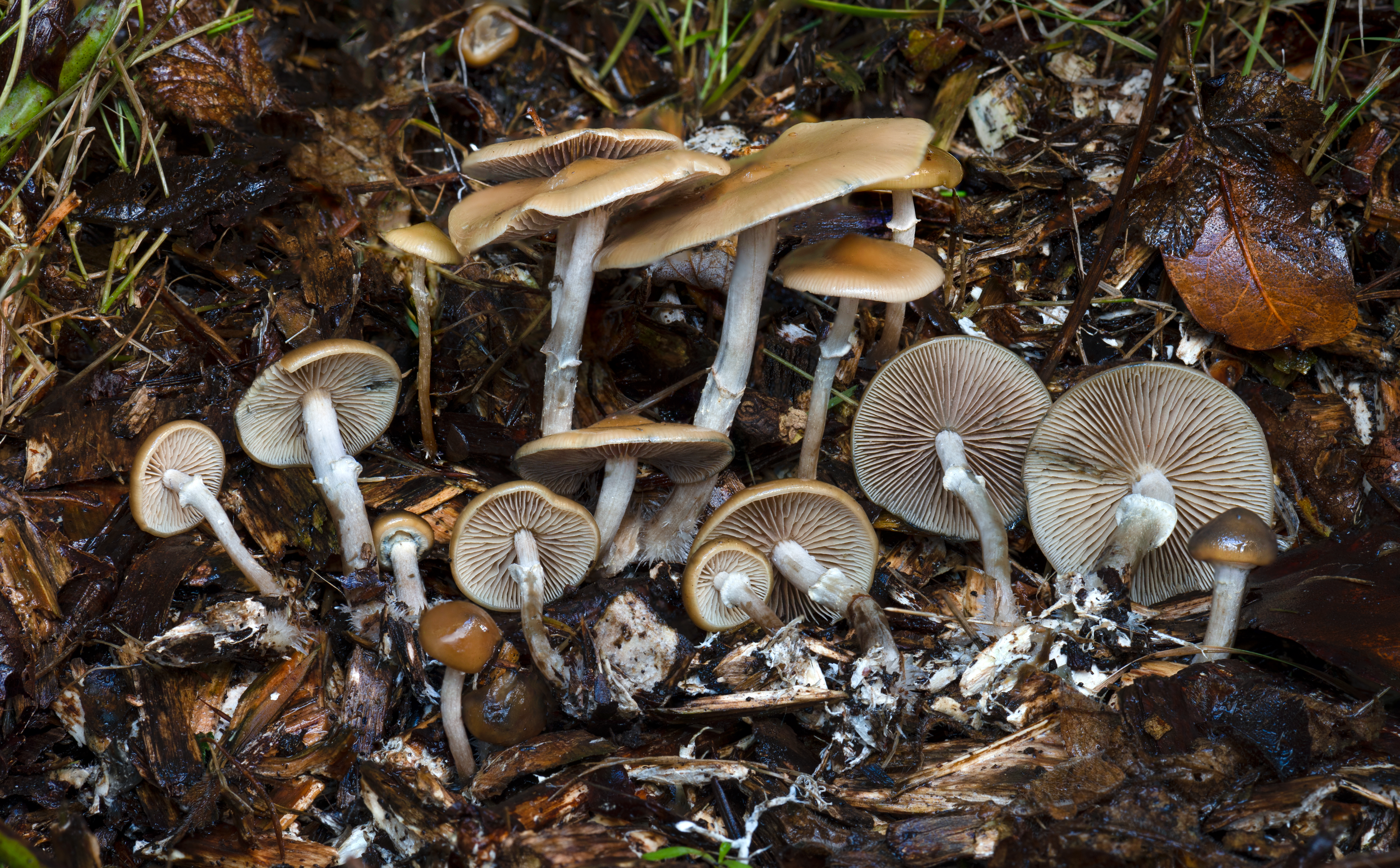
P. ovoideocystidiata, Washington

Psilocybe fruit bodies are generally small, undistinguished mushrooms with a typical "little brown mushroom" morphology. Macroscopically, they are characterized by their small to occasionally medium size, brown to yellow-brown coloration, with a hygrophanous cap, and a spore print-color that ranges from lilac-brown to dark purple-brown (though rusty-brown colored varieties are known in at least one species). Hallucinogenic species typically have a blue-staining reaction when the fruit body is bruised (from the oxidation of psilocin). However, blue bruising alone is not a reliable way to identify Psilocybe mushrooms. Some poisonous mushrooms can look very similar, making identification difficult and potentially dangerous.

Microscopically, they are characterized by pileipellis with hyphae that run parallel to the pileus surface, forming a cutis, by their lack of chrysocystidia, and by spores which are smooth, ellipsoid to rhomboid to subhexagonal in shape, with a distinct apical germ pore. Ecologically, all species of Psilocybe are saprotrophs, growing on various kinds of decaying organic matter.

== Taxonomy ==
=== Taxonomic history ===
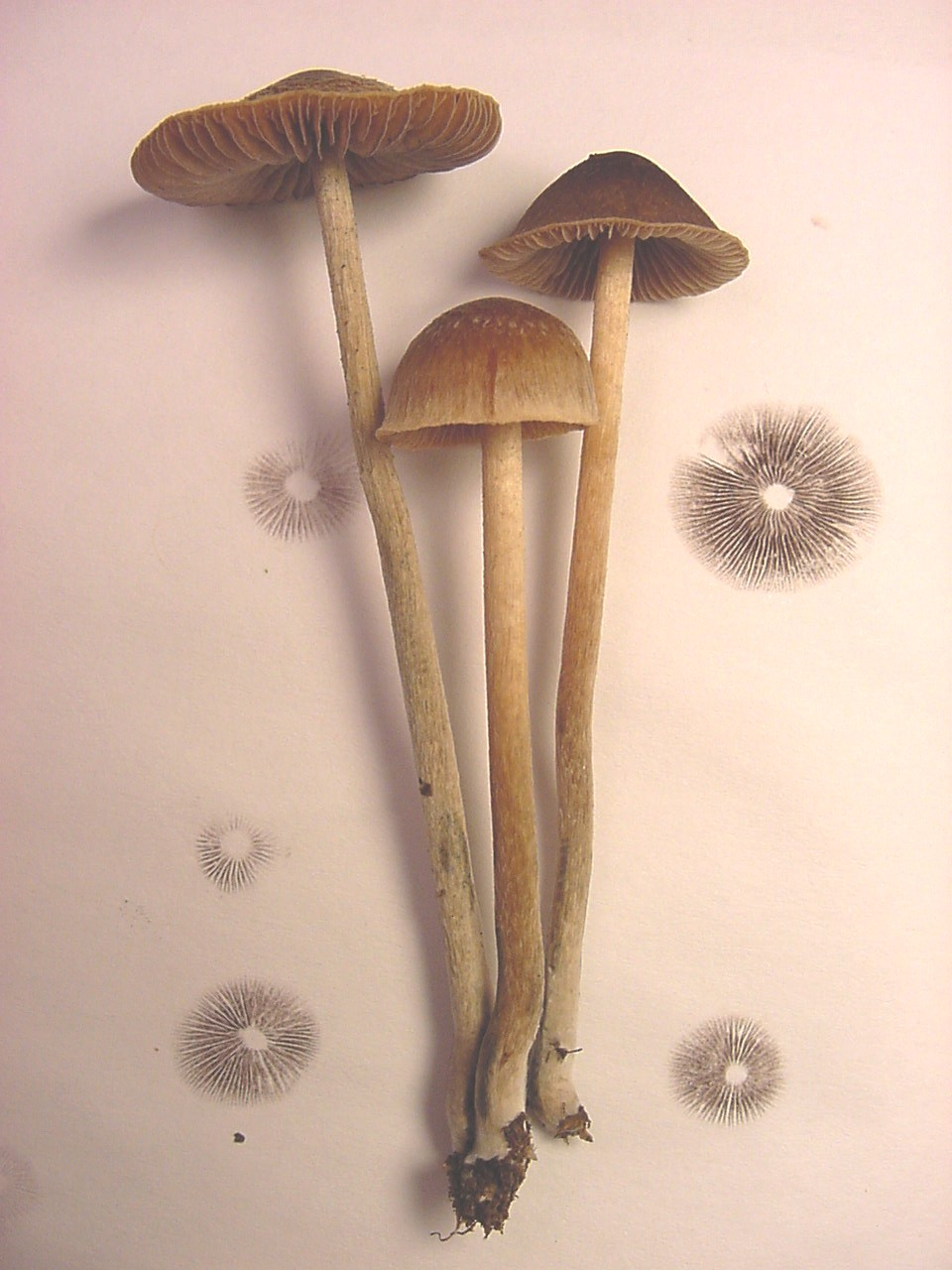
P. tampanensis with spore prints

A 2002 study of the molecular phylogeny of the agarics indicated the genus Psilocybe as then defined was polyphyletic, falling into two distinct clades that are not directly related to each other. The blue-staining hallucinogenic species constituted one clade and the non-bluing species the other. The previous type species of the genus, Psilocybe montana (now Deconica montana), was in the non-bluing clade. A 2006 molecular phylogenetic study of the Agaricales by Matheny and colleagues, further demonstrated the separation of the bluing and non-bluing clades of Psilocybe in a larger, strongly supported phylogenetic tree of the Agaricales.

Psilocybe had been placed taxonomically in the agaric family Strophariaceae based upon its spore and pileipellis morphology. The phylogenetic study by Matheny et al., placed the non-bluing Psilocybe and its close relatives in a basal position within the Strophariaceae, a sister taxon to a clade containing the other genera within that family. The bluing Psilocybe, however, form a clade that is sister to Galerina in the newly revised family, Hymenogastraceae which used to be restricted to secotioid, false-truffles. The 2002 phylogenetic study also found that the agaric genus Melanotus is simply a subgroup of the non-bluing Psilocybe (placed in Deconica since 2010, see below) and also pointed to a close relationship between the latter genus and the genera Kuehneromyces and Phaeogalera.

=== Modern classification ===
In 2007, a paper by Redhead et al. proposed conserving the genus Psilocybe with Psilocybe semilanceata as its type species. By replacing the non-bluing (and non-hallucinogenic) type species, this proposal seeks to avoid having to change the genus names of the more important hallucinogenic species as a result of the phylogenetic discoveries.

The suggestion was accepted by unanimous vote of the Nomenclature Committee for Fungi of the International Botanical Congress in 2010, meaning that ' P. semilanceata (a member of the bluing clade) now serves as the type species of the genus. Since P. semilanceata is now the type species of the genus, the bluing hallucinogenic clade remained in the genus Psilocybe (Hymenogastraceae) while the non-bluing clade were transferred to the genus Deconica (Strophariaceae).

Not all members of the "bluing" clade (modern Psilocybe s.s.) are bluing and hallucinogenic: some species have secondarily lost these features. P. fuscofulva (used to be known as P. atrobrunnea) and P. fimetaria are two examples.

=== Etymology ===
The genus name Psilocybe is a compound of the Greek elements ψιλός (psilós) 'bare' / 'naked' / 'bald' and κύβη (kúbe) 'head' / 'swelling', giving the meaning "bare-headed" (i.e. bald) referring to the mushroom's detachable pellicle (loose skin over the cap), which can resemble a bald pate.

== Distribution and habitat ==
Global distribution of over 100 psychoactive species of genus Psilocybe mushrooms

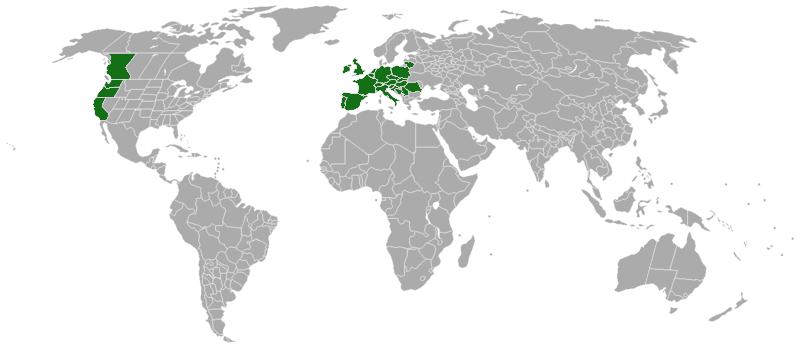
Approximate known range of Psilocybe cyanescens

Geographically, species in this genus are found throughout the world in most biomes. The greatest species diversity seems to be in the neotropics, from Mesoamerica through Brazil and Chile. Psilocybe are found in a variety of habitats and substrates. Many of the species found in temperate regions, such as Psilocybe cyanescens, seem to have an affinity for landscaped areas mulched with woodchips and are actually rather rare in natural settings removed from human habitation. Contrary to popular belief, only a minority of Psilocybe species, such as P. cubensis and P. subcubensis, grow directly on feces. Many other species are found in habitats such as mossy, grassy, or forest humus soils. Psilocybe arose about 65 million years ago. In 2023, two new Psilocybe species (Hymenogastraceae), P. ingeli and P. maluti, were described from southern Africa.

== Psychoactivity ==
=== Biochemistry and pharmacology ===
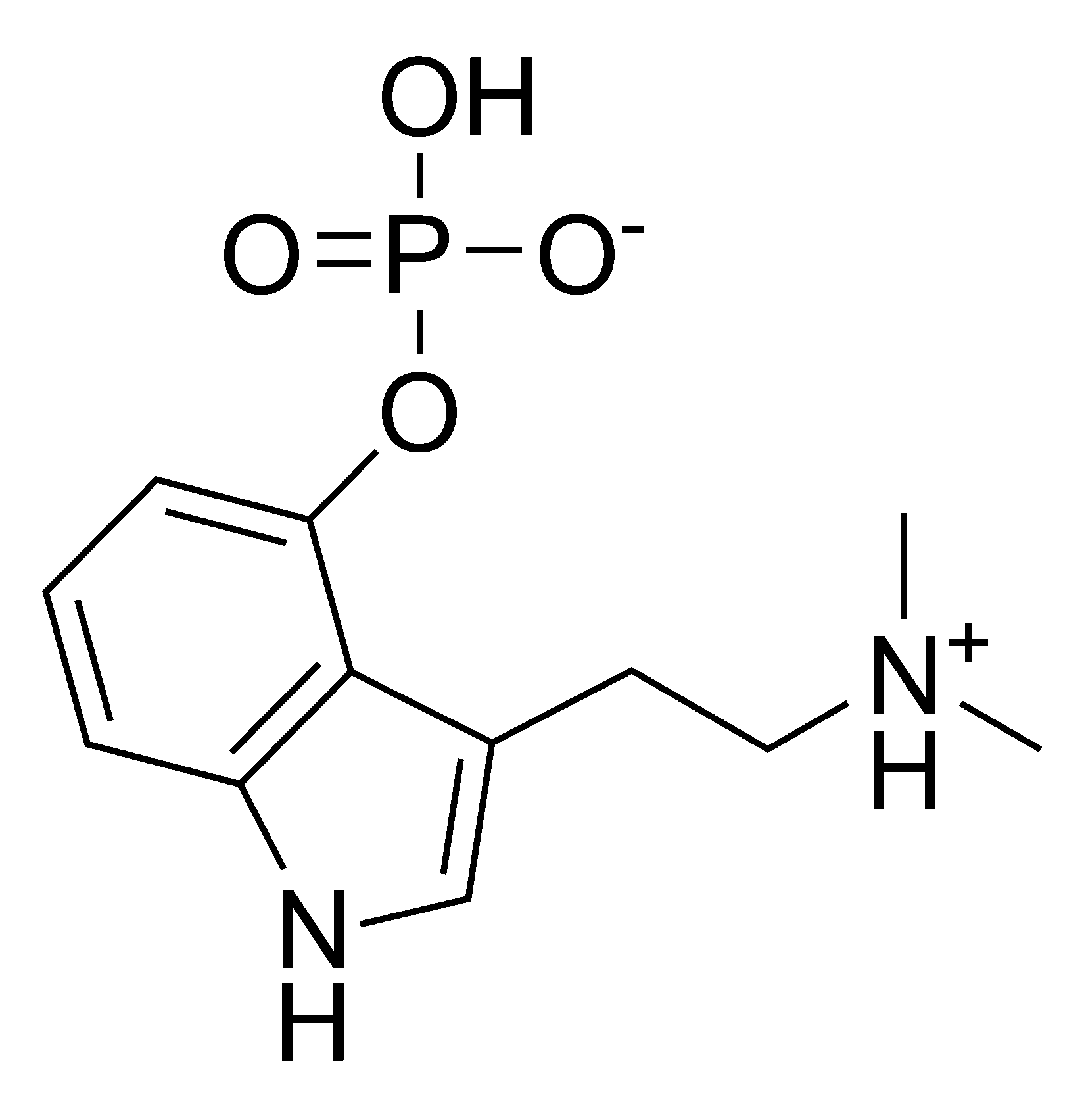
Psilocybin molecule

Psilocin molecule

The psilocybin molecule is indirectly responsible for the hallucinogenic properties of the Psilocybe. This compound, as well as all other indole alkaloids, are derived from the amino acid tryptophan, being the only amino acid with the indole-amine ring. Tryptophan is converted to tryptamine by decarboxylation. Two methylation steps occur producing DMT, another psychedelic compound. Hydroxylation of this compound produces the more potent hallucinogen psilocin, followed by phosphorylation yielding psilocybin. After ingestion of the psilocybin compound alkaline phosphatases present in the body's digestive system, kidneys, and possibly in the blood readily cleave the phosphoryl ester bond from psilocybin, yielding the hydroxyl compound, psilocin. Psilocin is the chemical primarily responsible for the hallucinogenic effects of the Psilocybe. The blue-staining species of Psilocybe are characterized by the presence of psilocin and psilocybin. This blue-staining reaction occurs after the fruit body has been injured, particularly near the base of the stalk. This reaction is thought to be due to the oxidation of psilocybin after the outer surface of the fruit body has been breached. The degree of bluing in a Psilocybe fruit body roughly correlates with the concentration of psilocin in the mushroom. Psilocybin is chemically far more stable than psilocin, the latter compound being largely lost when the mushroom is heated or dried.

The chemical structure of serotonin, a neurotransmitter, is similar to that of psilocin. The latter differs mainly by the location of one of the hydroxyls, and the addition of two methyl groups that make the molecule lipophilic (fat soluble), ergo capable of crossing the lipid membrane sheaths of the central nervous system. After psilocybin has been ingested and dephosphorylated, to psilocin, the mechanism it uses in the brain has a direct agonist effect on the 5-HT serotonin receptors. To explain this effect, the psilocin molecule essentially mimics the serotonin molecule, binding to the 5-HT receptors and initiating the same response as the serotonin. This effect explains the euphoria experienced by ingestion of this "agonist." Initially, hallucinogens were thought to blockade these serotonin neurotransmitters, but persistent research led to this agonist effect conclusion.

Woolley and Campbell conducted research to determine whether the depletion of the hormone serotonin had a direct effect on mental disorders and that hallucinations might be due to an excess of serotonin. Their results led them to study chemicals analogous to serotonin. They found that the psychoactive chemicals psilocybin and psilocin exhibited serotonin-like effects, however as dosage increased, these compounds acted as serotonin antagonists, psilocybin being comparable to the most potent antagonist yet discovered. This is a plausible basis for the psychological effects of these hallucinogenic compounds.

Even though these chemicals are psychoactive and therefore the basidiomycete deemed toxic, there have been no reports of fatalities or induced internal organ damage directly associated with ingestion of these chemicals. Misidentification of the fruit body could lead to ingestion of a lethal fungus.

Some psychoactive species contain baeocystin, norbaeocystin and β‐carboline monoamine oxidase inhibitors in addition to psilocin and psilocybin.

=== Medical and psychiatric aspects ===
The medicinal uses of the Psilocybe was recorded by Native Americans of Central America. Shamans, or curanderas would avidly ingest the "sacred mushrooms" for the extrasensory perceptual effects it gave them in order to better assess problems faced in their society. The observed effects of the alkaloids found in these mushrooms has given rise to research into their possible uses for psychiatric medicine. For details on contemporary research, see: Psilocybin: Medical research.

== History and ethnography ==
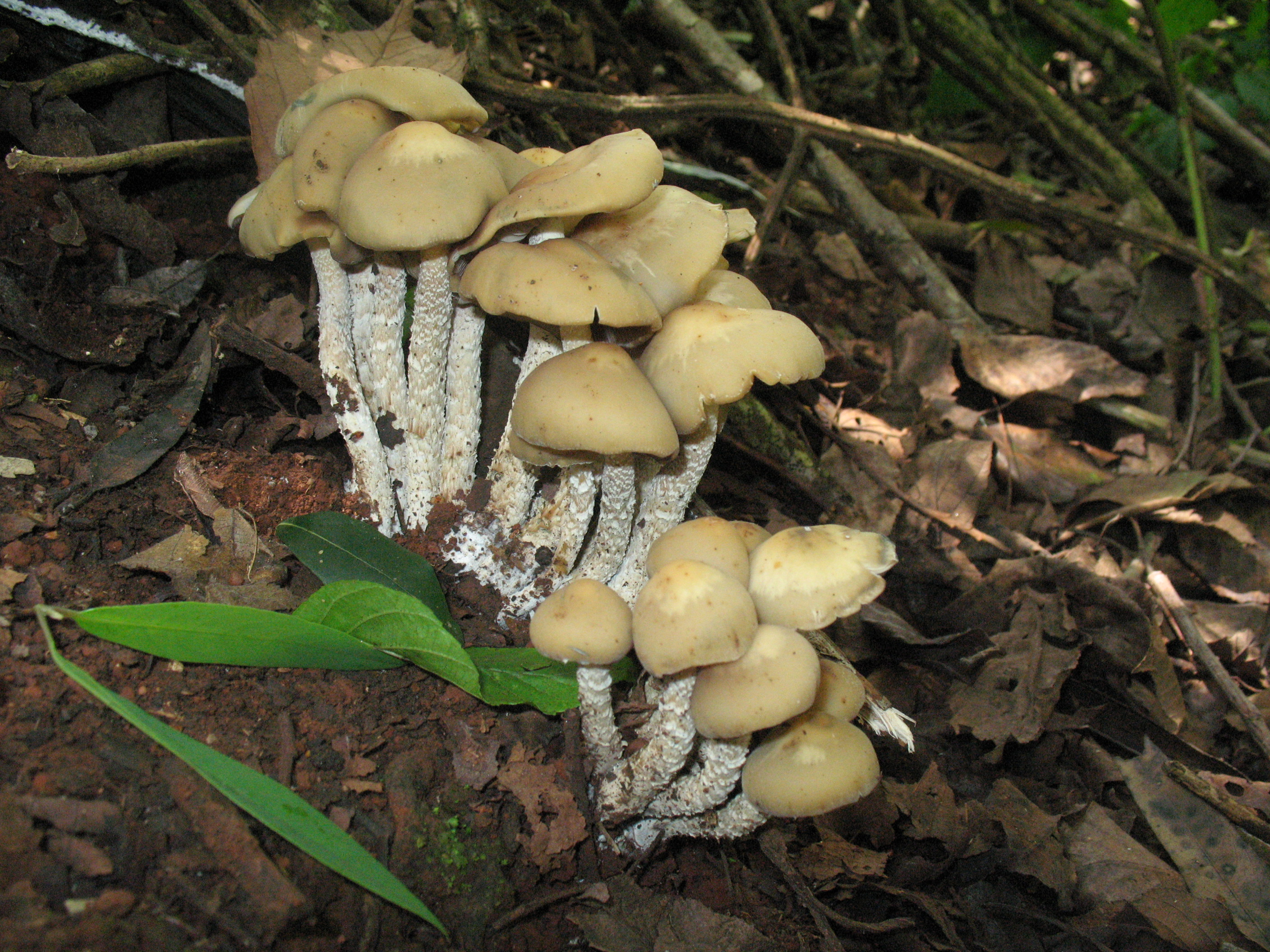
P. zapotecorum, Mexico

Hallucinogenic species of Psilocybe have a long history of use among the native peoples of Mesoamerica for religious communion, divination, and healing, from pre-Columbian times up to the present day. Hallucinogenic Psilocybe were known to the aboriginal Mexicans as teonanácatl (literally "divine mushroom") and were reportedly served at the coronation of Moctezuma II in 1502. After the Spanish conquest of the Americas, the use of hallucinogenic plants and mushrooms, like other pre-Christian traditions, was forcibly suppressed and driven underground.

By the 20th century, hallucinogenic mushroom use was thought by non-Native Americans to have disappeared entirely. However, in 1955, Valentina Wasson and R. Gordon Wasson became the first Westerners to actively participate in an indigenous mushroom ceremony. The Wassons did much to publicize their discovery, even publishing an article on their experiences in Life in 1957. In 1956, Roger Heim identified the hallucinogenic mushroom that the Wassons had brought back from Mexico as Psilocybe and in 1958, Albert Hofmann first reported psilocin and psilocybin as the active compound in these mushrooms. There is some skepticism as to whether or not these "sacred mushrooms" were actually in the genus Psilocybe. However, according to Heim's research in Mexico, he identified three species of Psilocybe that he believed were used in these native ceremonies. The species identified by Heim were; P. mexicana, P. caerulescens, and P. zapotecorum. are a variety of Psilocybe mushrooms that make up the teonanácatl group of hallucinogenic mushrooms, including P. cubensis. Isauro Nava Garcia, a Mazatec man, provided guidance to Heim while Heim conducted his field and culture work. Garcia was an avid observer of the fungi in his environment while identifying specific characteristics about the fruit body of the Psilocybe his ancestors utilized, as well as knowing where they could be found.

At present, hallucinogenic mushroom use has been reported among a number of groups spanning from central Mexico to Oaxaca, including groups of Nahua, Mixtecs, Mixe, Mazatecs, Zapotecs, and others.

A 2024 research paper identified Psilocybe maluti as a new species from the Free State Province of South Africa and Lesotho in Southern Africa. Anecdotal reports suggest that the mushroom is used spiritually and traditionally by Basotho healers, marking it the only documented instance of traditional hallucinogenic mushroom use in Africa and the earliest recorded reference to such practices in Sub-Saharan Africa.

The popularization of entheogens by Wasson, Timothy Leary, and others has led to an explosion in the use of hallucinogenic Psilocybe throughout the world. By the early 1970s, a number of psychoactive Psilocybe species were described from temperate North America, Europe, and Asia and were widely collected. Books describing methods of cultivating P. cubensis in large quantities were also published. The relatively easy availability of hallucinogenic Psilocybe from wild and cultivated sources has made it among the most widely used of the hallucinogenic drugs.

== Legal status ==
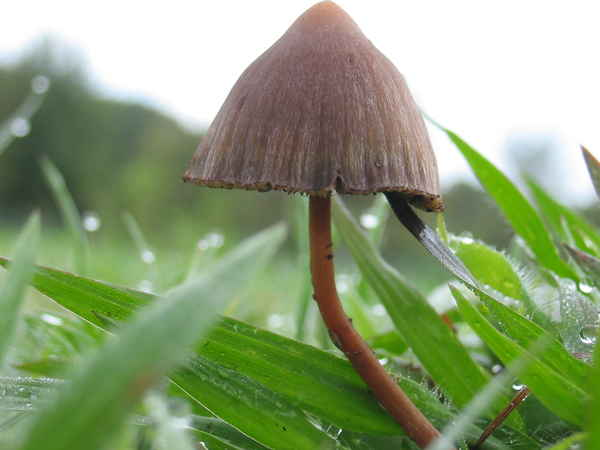
P. mexicana, Mexico

The purified chemicals psilocybin and psilocin are listed as Schedule II drugs under the United Nations 1971 Convention on Psychotropic Substances. However, the UN drug treaties do not apply to cultivation, preparation, or international transport of psilocybin mushrooms.

Internationally, the two chemicals are generally considered controlled substances. However, there is much ambiguity about what is considered a "container" of these compounds. In several countries (e.g. Brazil), the chemicals themselves are listed as controlled substances, but the mushrooms that contain the chemicals are not, therefore deemed legal. In the United States, possession of Psilocybe mushroom fruiting bodies is illegal in every state except for Florida. This is because the Supreme Court of Florida does not believe that these mushrooms could "reasonably be found to be containers of the schedule I substance, psilocybin".

In the United States, there is no federal law mentioning the possession of Psilocybe spores. This is because only the psilocybin and psilocin compounds are considered Schedule I drugs and there is no presence of these compounds in the spores themselves, only in the fruiting body of the cultivated spores. However, there are several US states that have actually prohibited possession of these spores because they can be cultivated to produce these hallucinogenic, Schedule I drugs. These states includes California, Georgia, and Idaho.

However, possession of the spores by a qualified mycologist in California is legal if being put to use for research purposes, which must be approved by Research Advisory Panel. If not authorized by law, possession of spores or cultivation of fruiting bodies of the Psilocybe is punishable to no more than one year in county jail or state prison.

Psilocybin mushrooms, as well as other "soft drugs" which are stronger than cannabis but not synthetic, are legally available through smart shops in the Netherlands. Only the truffle form of magic mushrooms (such as P. tampanensis) are currently legal, but these still contain the active ingredients and produce similar effect as the caps and stalks.

== Notable species ==
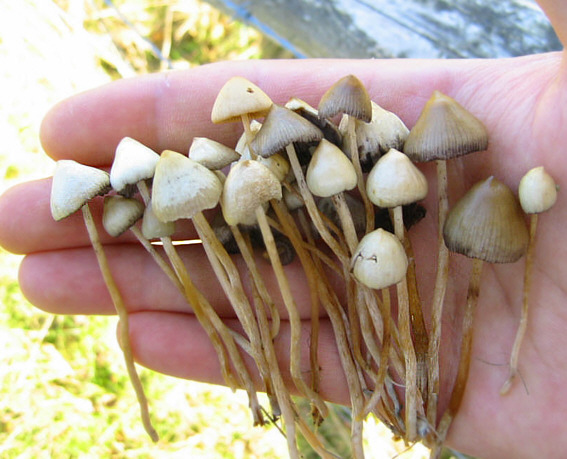
Psilocybe semilanceata

- Psilocybe cubensis (Stropharia cubensis); the most commonly cultivated and consumed Psilocybe, due to ease of cultivation and large size of fruit bodies; also commonly collected throughout the tropics and subtropics, nicknamed the commercial psilocybe.
- Psilocybe cyanescens; Native to the Pacific Northwest of North America, but also found in western Europe; nicknamed the wavy-cap or wavies.
- Psilocybe ochraceocentrata (formerly confused with Psilocybe natalensis) is found in Southern Africa and closest known free-living relative to Psilocybe cubensis.
- Psilocybe natalensis, native to South Africa
- Psilocybe semilanceata; The most common psilocybin-containing mushroom. Found in northern temperate climates; nicknamed the liberty cap.
- Psilocybe azurescens, a highly potent species native to the U.S. states of Washington and Oregon, but popular in outdoor cultivation, and expanding its range as a result; nicknamed azies.

== See also ==
- María Sabina
