= List of Psilocybe species =

This is a list of species in the agaric genus Psilocybe.

A B C D E F G H I J K L M N O P Q R S T U V U W X Y Z

== A ==
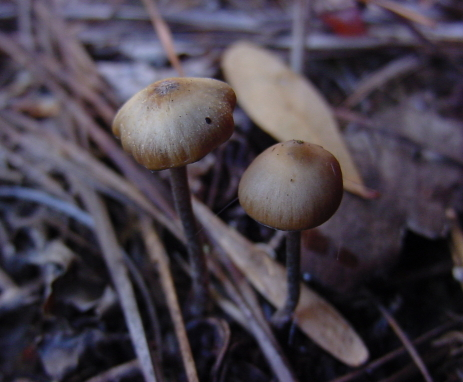
Psilocybe atlantis Guzmán, Hanlin & C.White 2003

- Psilocybe acadiensis A.H.Sm.
- Psilocybe acutipilea (Speg.) Guzmán
- Psilocybe aerugineomaculans (Hohn.) Singer & A.H. Sm.
- Psilocybe allenii Borov., Rockefeller & P.G.Werner
- Psilocybe alutacea Y.S. Chang & A.K. Mills
- Psilocybe angulospora Yen W. Wang & S.S. Tzean
- Psilocybe angustipleurocystidiata Guzmán
- Psilocybe antioquiensis Guzmán, Saldarr., Pineda, G. Garcia & L.-F. Velazquez
- Psilocybe atlantis Guzmán, Hanlin & C. White
- Psilocybe aquamarina (Pegler) Guzmán
- Psilocybe aucklandiae Guzmán, C.C. King & Bandala
- Psilocybe aztecorum R. Heim
- Psilocybe azurescens Stamets & Gartz

== B ==
- Psilocybe baeocystis Singer & A.H. Sm.
- Psilocybe banderillensis Guzmán
- Psilocybe bohemica Šebek
- Psilocybe brasiliensis Guzmán
- Psilocybe brunneocystidiata Guzmán & Horak

== C ==
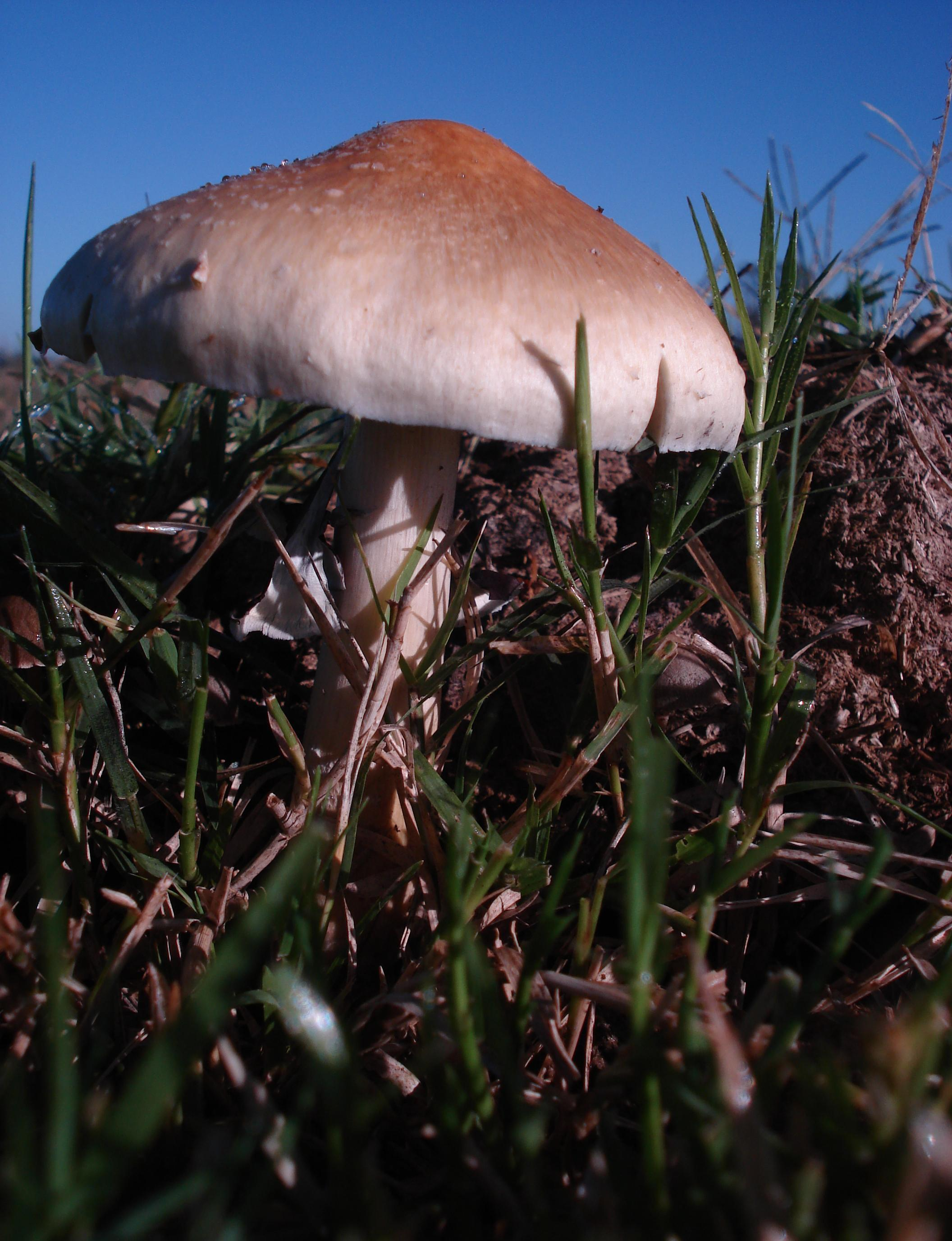
Psilocybe cubensis

- Psilocybe cabiensis Guzmán, M.Torres & Ram.-Guill
- Psilocybe caeruleoannulata Singer ex Guzmán
- Psilocybe caerulescens Murrill
- Psilocybe caeruleorhiza Canan, Ostuni, Rockefeller & Birkebak
- Psilocybe caerulipes (Peck) Sacc.
- Psilocybe carbonaria Singer
- Psilocybe chiapanensis Guzmán
- Psilocybe chuxiongensis T.Ma & K.D.Hyde
- Psilocybe cinnamomea J.F.Liang, Yang K.Li & Ye Yuan
- Psilocybe collybioides Singer & A.H. Sm.
- Psilocybe columbiana Guzmán
- Psilocybe congolensis Guzmán
- Psilocybe coprinifacies (Rolland) Pouzar
- Psilocybe cordispora R. Heim
- Psilocybe cubensis (Earle) Singer
- Psilocybe cyanescens Wakef.
- Psilocybe cyanofibrillosa Guzmán & Stamets

== D ==
- Psilocybe dumontii Singer ex Guzmán

== E ==
- Psilocybe egonii Guzmán & T.J. Baroni
- Psilocybe eximia E. Horak & Desjardin

== F ==
- Psilocybe fagicola R. Heim & Cailleux
- Psilocybe farinacea Rick ex Guzmán
- Psilocybe fasciata Hongo
- Psilocybe ferrugineolateritia A.H. Sm.
- Psilocybe fimetaria (P.D. Orton) Watling
- Psilocybe fuliginosa (Murrill) A.H. Sm.
- Psilocybe furtadoana Guzmán
- Psilocybe fuscofulva Peck

== G ==
- Psilocybe galindoi Guzmán
- Psilocybe gallaeciae Guzmán
- Psilocybe graveolens Peck
- Psilocybe guatapensis Guzmán, Saldarriaga, Pineda, Garcia & Velazquez
- Psilocybe guilartensis Guzmán, Tapia & Nieves-Rivera

== H ==
- Psilocybe heimii Guzmán
- Psilocybe herrerae Guzmán
- Psilocybe hispanica Guzmán
- Psilocybe hoogshagenii R. Heim

== I ==
- Psilocybe inconspicua Guzmán & Horak
- Psilocybe indica Sathe & J.T. Daniel
- Psilocybe isabelae Guzmán

== J ==
- Psilocybe jacobsii Guzmán
- Psilocybe jaliscana Guzmán

== K ==
- Psilocybe keralensis K.A. Thomas, Manim. & Guzmán
- Psilocybe kumaenorum R. Heim

== L ==
- Psilocybe laurae Guzmán
- Psilocybe lazoi Singer
- Psilocybe liniformans

== M ==
- Psilocybe magnispora E. Horak, Guzmán & Desjardin
- Psilocybe mairei Singer
- Psilocybe makarorae Johnst. & Buchanan
- Psilocybe maluti van der Merwe, Rockefeller & Jacobs
- Psilocybe mammillata (Murrill) A.H. Sm.
- Psilocybe medullosa (Bres.) Borovička
- Psilocybe meridensis Guzmán
- Psilocybe meridionalis Guzmán, Ram.-Guill. & Guzm.-Dáv.
- Psilocybe mescaleroensis Guzmán, Walstad, E. Gándara & Ram.-Guill.
- Psilocybe mesophylla Guzmán, J. Q. Jacobs & Escalona
- Psilocybe mexicana R. Heim
- Psilocybe moseri Guzmán
- Psilocybe muliercula Singer & A.H. Sm.

== N ==
- Psilocybe natalensis Gartz, Reid, M.T. Sm. & Eicker
- Psilocybe natarajanii Guzmán

== O ==
- Psilocybe oaxacana Guzmán, Escalona & J. Q. Jacobs
- Psilocybe ochraceocentrata
- Psilocybe ovoideocystidiata Guzmán & Gaines

== P ==
- Psilocybe papuana Guzmán & Horak
- Psilocybe paulensis (Guzmán & Bononi) Guzmán
- Psilocybe pelliculosa (A.H. Sm.) Singer & A.H. Sm.
- Psilocybe pericystis Singer
- Psilocybe pintonii Guzmán
- Psilocybe pleurocystidiosa Guzmán
- Psilocybe plutonia (Berk. & M.A. Curtis) Sacc.
- Psilocybe portoricensis Guzmán, Tapia & Nieves-Rivera
- Psilocybe pseudoaztecorum Natarajan & Raman
- Psilocybe puberula Bas & Noordel.

== Q ==
- Psilocybe quebecensis Ola'h & R. Heim

== R ==
- Psilocybe rickii Guzmán & Cortez
- Psilocybe rostrata (Petch) Pegler
- Psilocybe ruiliensis
- Psilocybe rzedowskii Guzmán

== S ==
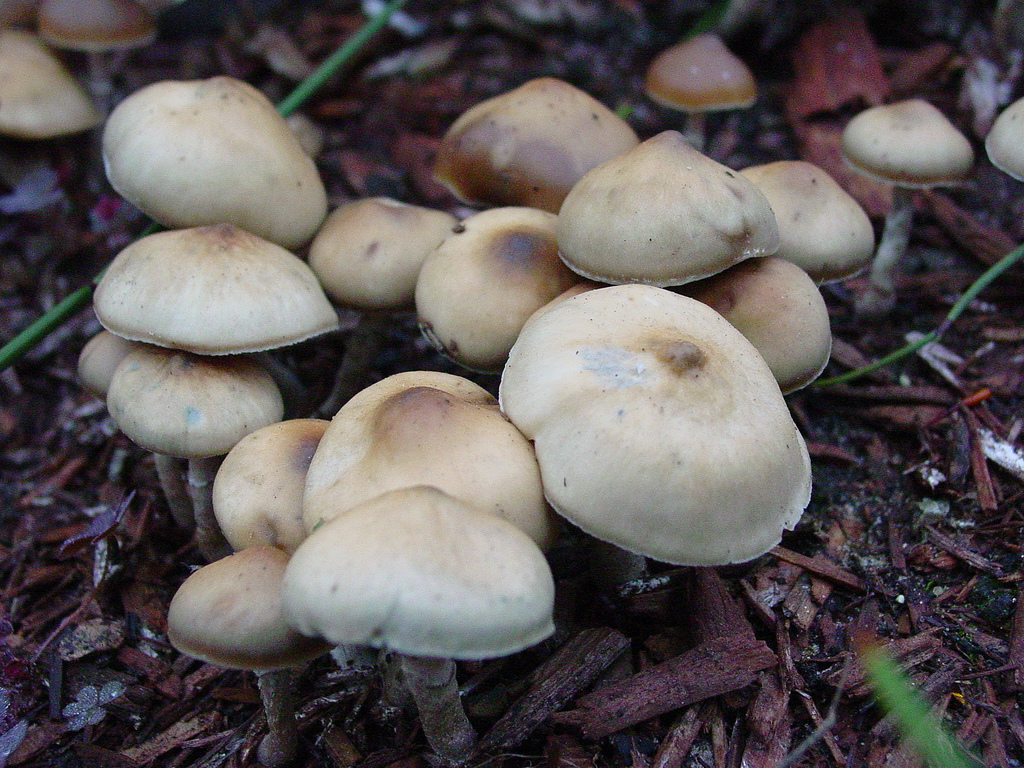
Psilocybe ovoideocystidiata

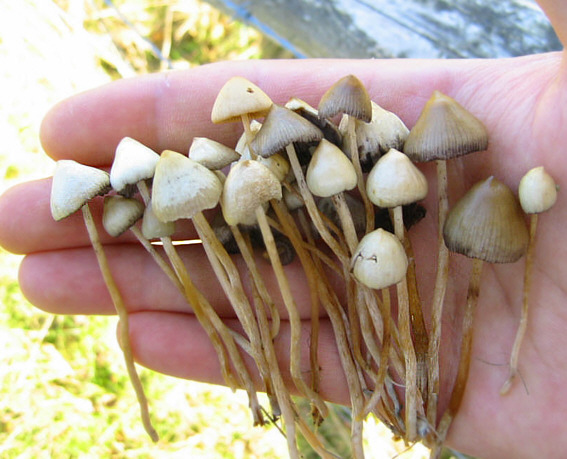
Psilocybe semilanceata

- Psilocybe samuiensis Guzmán, Bandala & Allen
- Psilocybe schultesii Guzmán & S.H. Pollock
- Psilocybe semiangustipleurocystidiata Guzmán, Ram.-Guill. & M.Torres
- Psilocybe semilanceata (Fr. : Secr.) Kumm.
- Psilocybe septentrionalis (Guzman) Guzmán
- Psilocybe serbica Moser & Horak
- Psilocybe sierrae Singer
- Psilocybe silvatica (Peck) Singer & A.H. Sm.
- Psilocybe singeri Guzmán
- Psilocybe singularis Guzmán, Escalona & J. Q. Jacobs
- Psilocybe strictipes Singer & A.H. Smith
- Psilocybe stuntzii Guzmán & Ott
- Psilocybe subacutipilea Guzmán, Saldarriaga, Pineda, Garcia & Velazquez
- Psilocybe subaeruginascens Hohn.
- Psilocybe subaeruginosa Cleland
- Psilocybe subcaerulipes Hongo
- Psilocybe subcubensis Guzmán
- Psilocybe subheliconiae Guzmán, Ram.-Guill. & M.Torres
- Psilocybe subhoogshagenii Guzmán, M.Torres & Ram.-Guill.
- Psilocybe subpsilocybioides Guzmán, Lodge & S.A. Cantrell
- Psilocybe subtropicalis Guzmán

== T ==
- Psilocybe tampanensis Guzmán & S.H.Pollock
- Psilocybe tasmaniana Guzmán & Watling
- Psilocybe thaicordispora Guzmán, Ram.-Guill. & Karun.
- Psilocybe thaiaerugineomaculans Guzmán, Karun. & Ram.-Guill.
- Psilocybe thaiduplicatocystidiata Guzmán, Karun. & Ram.-Guill.
- Psilocybe tuxtlensis Guzmán

== U ==
- Psilocybe uruguayensis Singer ex Guzmán
- Psilocybe uxpanapensis Guzmán

== V ==
- Psilocybe venenata (S. Imai) Imaz. & Hongo
- Psilocybe verae-crucis Guzmán & Perez-Ortiz

== W ==
- Psilocybe washingtonensis A.H.Sm.
- Psilocybe wayanadensis K.A. Thomas, Manim. & Guzmán
- Psilocybe weldenii Guzmán
- Psilocybe weraroa Borov., Oborník & Noordel.

== Y ==
- Psilocybe yungensis Singer & A.H. Sm.

== Z ==
- Psilocybe zapotecoantillarum Guzmán, T.J. Baroni & Lodge
- Psilocybe zapotecocaribaea Guzmán, Ram.-Guill. & T.J. Baroni
- Psilocybe zapotecorum R. Heim

== See also ==
- Mushroom hunting
- Psilocybin mushroom
