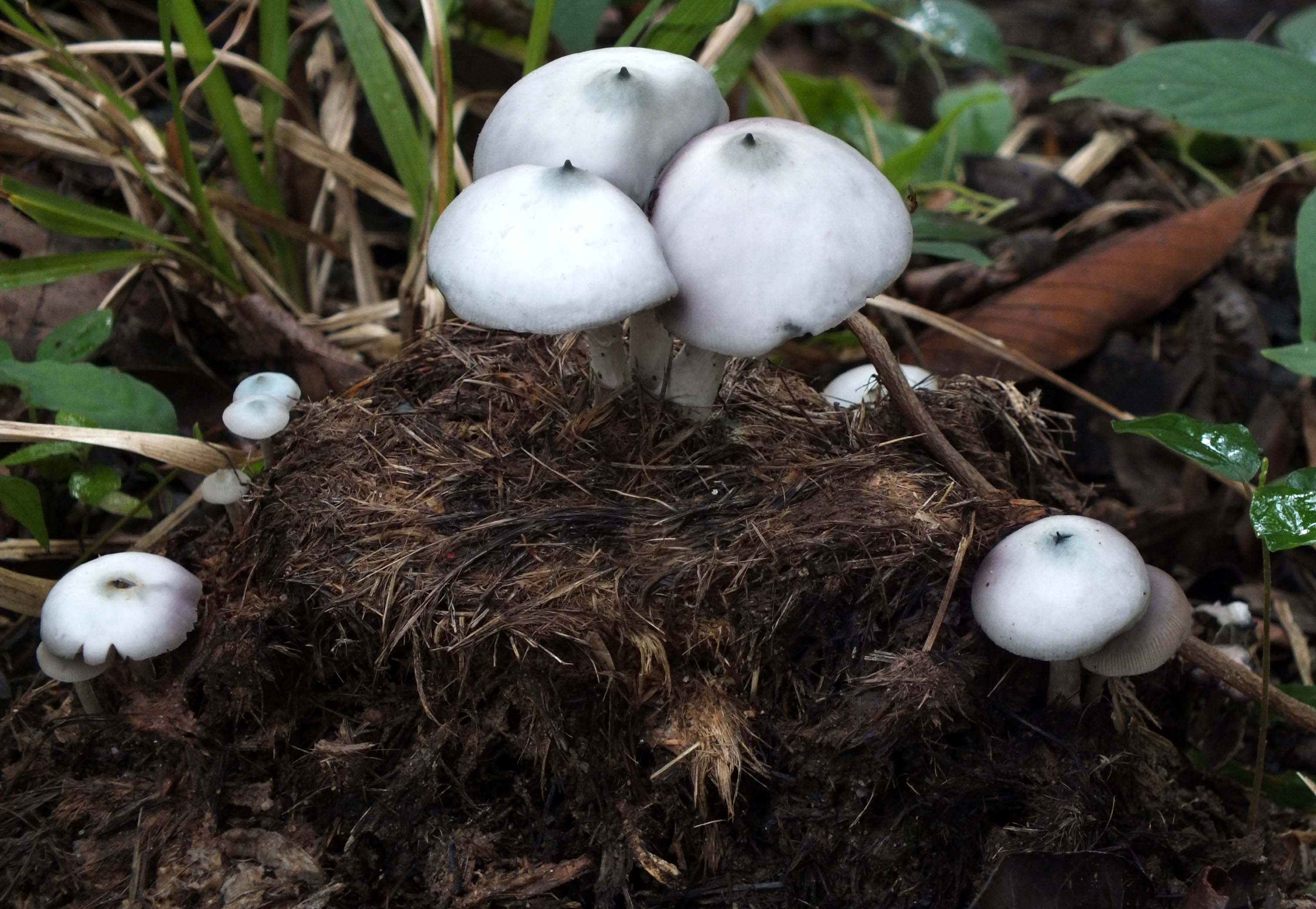

Scientific classification
- Domain: Eukaryota
- Kingdom: Fungi
- Division: Basidiomycota
- Class: Agaricomycetes
- Order: Agaricales
- Family: Hymenogastraceae
- Genus: Psilocybe
- Species: P. magnispora

Binomial name
- Psilocybe magnispora E.Horak, Guzmán & Desjardin (2009)

= Psilocybe magnispora =

Species of fungus

Psilocybe magnispora is a species of psilocybin mushroom in the family Hymenogastraceae. Found in Thailand, where it grows on the rotting dung of Elephas, it was described as new to science in 2009.

== See also ==
- List of psilocybin mushrooms
- List of Psilocybe species
