= Psilocybe mesophylla =

Scientific classification
- Domain: Eukaryota
- Kingdom: Fungi
- Division: Basidiomycota
- Class: Agaricomycetes
- Order: Agaricales
- Family: Hymenogastraceae
- Genus: Psilocybe
- Species: P. mesophylla

Binomial name
- Psilocybe mesophylla Guzmán, J.Q.Jacobs & Escalona (2004)

Species of fungus

Psilocybe mesophylla is a species of psilocybin mushroom in the family Hymenogastraceae. Found in Oaxaca, Mexico, where it grows on bare clay soil, it was described as new to science in 2004.

== See also ==
- List of psilocybin mushrooms
- List of Psilocybe species
