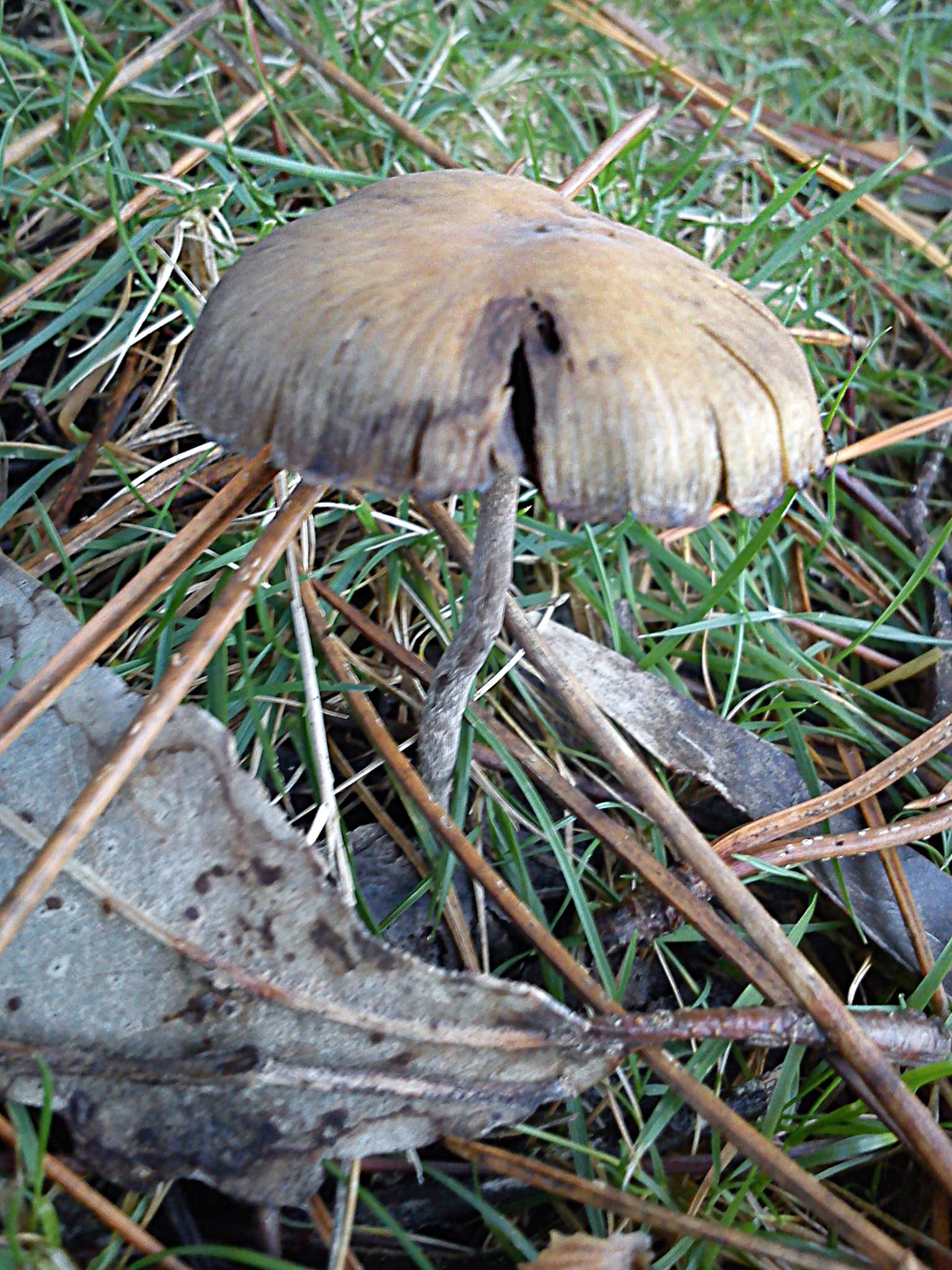

Scientific classification
- Kingdom: Fungi
- Division: Basidiomycota
- Class: Agaricomycetes
- Order: Agaricales
- Family: Hymenogastraceae
- Genus: Psilocybe
- Species: P. gallaeciae

Binomial name
- Psilocybe gallaeciae Guzmán & M.L.Castro (2003)

= Psilocybe gallaeciae =

Species of fungus

Psilocybe gallaeciae is a species of psilocybin mushroom in the family Hymenogastraceae. The first specimens for science were delivered to the Non-Vascular Plants Laboratory of the University of Vigo-CUVI (collected in the same area of Lagoas-Marcosende-CUVI, and which did not appear in any scientific bibliography) by C. Covelo Roma in 1996, and later registered by J. Comesaña in the municipalities of Monfero (province of La Coruña) and Nigrán (province of Pontevedra) in 1997, and published in the Bulletin of the Mycological Society of Madrid 27:185 as a new species in 2003 by the Mexican mycologist Gastón Guzmán and María Luisa Castro, from the University of Vigo. It is one of three species of Psilocybe mushrooms with hallucinogenic properties found in Spain, along with P. hispanica and P. semilanceata. It is endemic to Galicia. It grows gregariously in meadows and gardens and published as a new species in 2003.

== See also ==
- List of Psilocybe species
