= Psilocybe maluti =

Scientific classification
- Kingdom: Fungi
- Division: Basidiomycota
- Class: Agaricomycetes
- Order: Agaricales
- Family: Hymenogastraceae
- Genus: Psilocybe
- Species: P. maluti

Binomial name
- Psilocybe maluti B. van der Merwe, A. Rockefeller & K. Jacobs

Species of fungus

Psilocybe maluti (common name: Koae-ea-lekhoaba) is a coprophilic species of mushroom from the Hymenogastraceae family. Described from South Africa in 2024 by Breyten van der Merwe, Alan Rockefeller & Karin Jacobs, P. maluti is named after the Maluti Mountains of Southern Africa where they occur.

There is anecdotal evidence that P. maluti was used spiritually and traditionally by Basotho healers. This represents the only documented evidence of traditional hallucinogenic mushroom use in Africa, as well as the earliest recorded reference to such practices in Sub-Saharan Africa.

It is in the section Cubensae of the genus Psilocybe, other members of this section include P. cubensis, P. chuxgionensis, P. niveotropicalis, P. wayanadensis, P. thaiaerugineomaculans, P. thaiduplicatocystidiata and P. ovoideocystidiata.

== Description ==
- Cap: 5—20 mm in diameter and 20—40 mm in length. The cap is secotioid in shape, umbonate to papillate with incurved to recurved margin, wavy but irregular, sometimes striated to midway, often adorned with appendiculate whitish partial veil remnants. Cap colour is golden to caramel when mature and then lightening in age but becoming darker grayish in the lower regions as the spores mature.
- Stem: 40—80 mm in lengthy and 2—4 mm in diameter, cylindrical, surface fibrillose, whitish at first, becoming caramel brown with age, bruising bluish.
- Gills: Adnate with alight brown color when young, then deepens to a rich dark purple as it matures, with creamy white edges.
- Microscopic features: spores dark purple to dark purple, brown to dark brown in mass, 13–15.5 by 8.5–10.5 μm, ovoid to ellipsoid. Cheilocystidia clavate, mucronate, 19–31 by 7–11 μm. Pleurocystidia absent.

== Habitat and distribution ==
P. maluti is a cophrophilic species and grows scattered on the dung of herbivores like cattle and horses. The species grows in the highland regions of Lesotho and South Africa, appearing between November and February.

== Ecology and habitat ==
The species typically features a secotioid cap, meaning its cap typically stays closed. As a result, secotioid fungi spores are not dispersed by air and must rely on animals for spore dispersal.

Some researchers suggest that P. maluti mushroom may attract birds as spore dispersal agents, possibly due to their fruit-like appearance. Indigenous observations by the Basotho people, describe birds like the Corvus albus (pied crow) pecking at or consuming these mushrooms. This is reflected in the traditional name for P. maluti, namely koae-ea-lekhoaba; which translates to 'powdered tobacco' (koae), likely referring to the texture and spore color, and 'crow' or 'crow-like bird' (lekhoaba).

== See also ==
- List of Psilocybin mushrooms
- Psilocybin mushrooms
- Psilocybe
- Psilocybe ingeli
