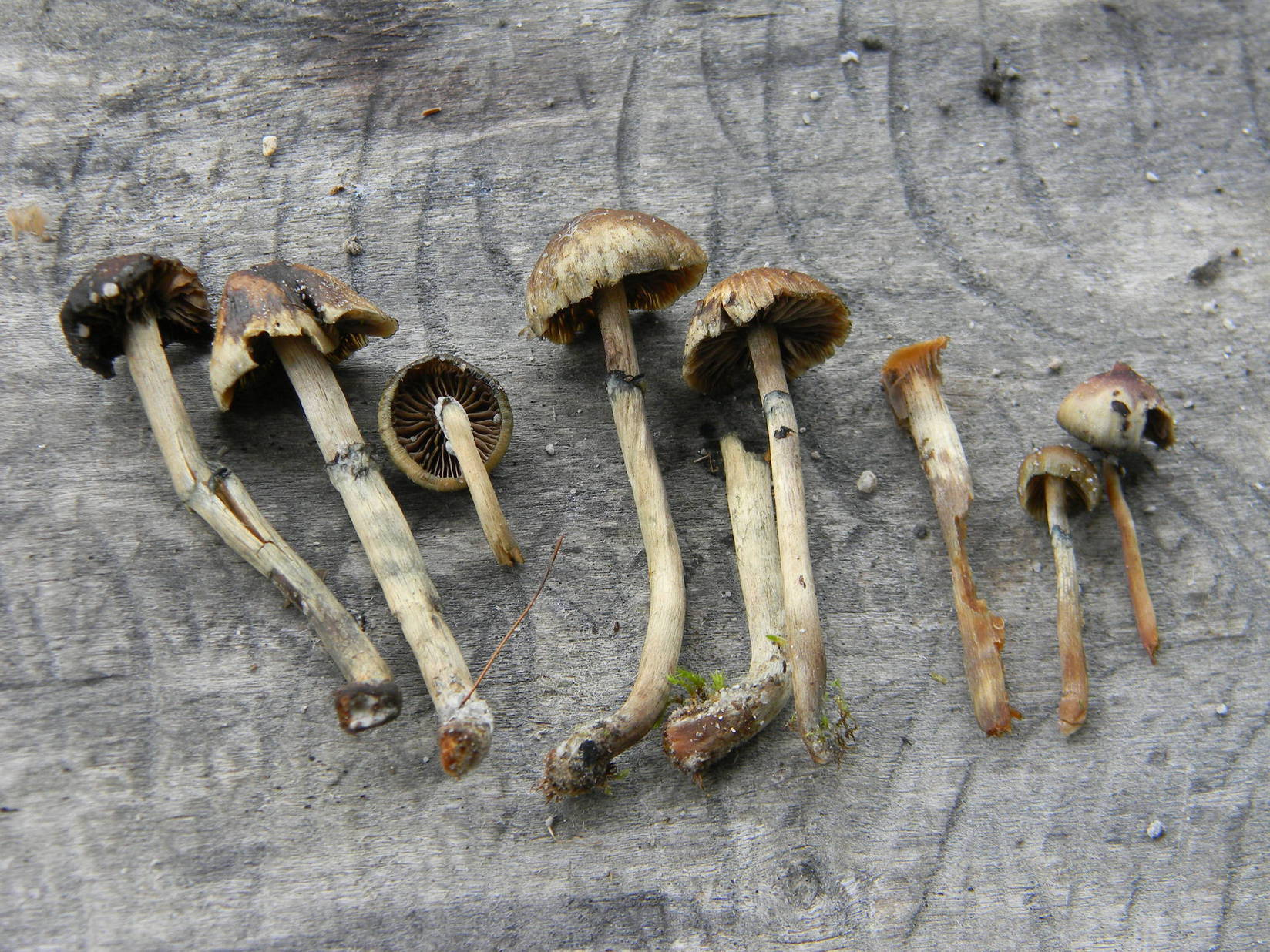

Scientific classification
- Kingdom: Fungi
- Division: Basidiomycota
- Class: Agaricomycetes
- Order: Agaricales
- Family: Hymenogastraceae
- Genus: Psilocybe
- Species: P. caeruleoannulata

Binomial name
- Psilocybe caeruleoannulata Singer ex Guzmán (1978)

Synonyms
- Stropharia siccipes var. lugubris Rick (1939)

= Psilocybe caeruleoannulata =

Species of fungus

Psilocybe caeruleoannulata is a species of psilocybin mushroom found in Uruguay and Brazil, where it grows on marshy grounds, grasslands, or pastures. It is the most common Psilocybe species in the Floresta Nacional de São Francisco de Paula, in Rio Grande do Sul, Brazil.

== See also ==
- List of psilocybin mushrooms
- List of Psilocybe species
