= Psilocybe thaicordispora =

Scientific classification
- Domain: Eukaryota
- Kingdom: Fungi
- Division: Basidiomycota
- Class: Agaricomycetes
- Order: Agaricales
- Family: Hymenogastraceae
- Genus: Psilocybe
- Species: P. thaicordispora

Binomial name
- Psilocybe thaicordispora Guzmán, Ram.-Guill. & Karun. (2012)

Species of fungus

Psilocybe thaicordispora is a species of psilocybin mushroom in the family Hymenogastraceae. Found near Huai Nam Dang National Park (Chiang Mai Province, Thailand), where it grows on the ground in open subtropical forest at an elevation of 1,500 metres (4,900 ft), it was described as new to science in 2012. The specific epithet thaicordispora refers to the section Cordisporae, and to Thailand.

== See also ==
- List of Psilocybe species
- List of Psilocybin mushrooms
