= Psilocybe cabiensis =

Scientific classification
- Domain: Eukaryota
- Kingdom: Fungi
- Division: Basidiomycota
- Class: Agaricomycetes
- Order: Agaricales
- Family: Hymenogastraceae
- Genus: Psilocybe
- Species: P. cabiensis

Binomial name
- Psilocybe cabiensis Guzmán, M.Torres & Ram.-Guill. (2006)

Species of fungus

Psilocybe cabiensis is a species of psilocybin mushroom in the family Hymenogastraceae. Described as new to science in 2004, it is found in Colombia, where it grows on bare clay soil in tropical forest.

== See also ==
- List of psilocybin mushrooms
- List of Psilocybe species
