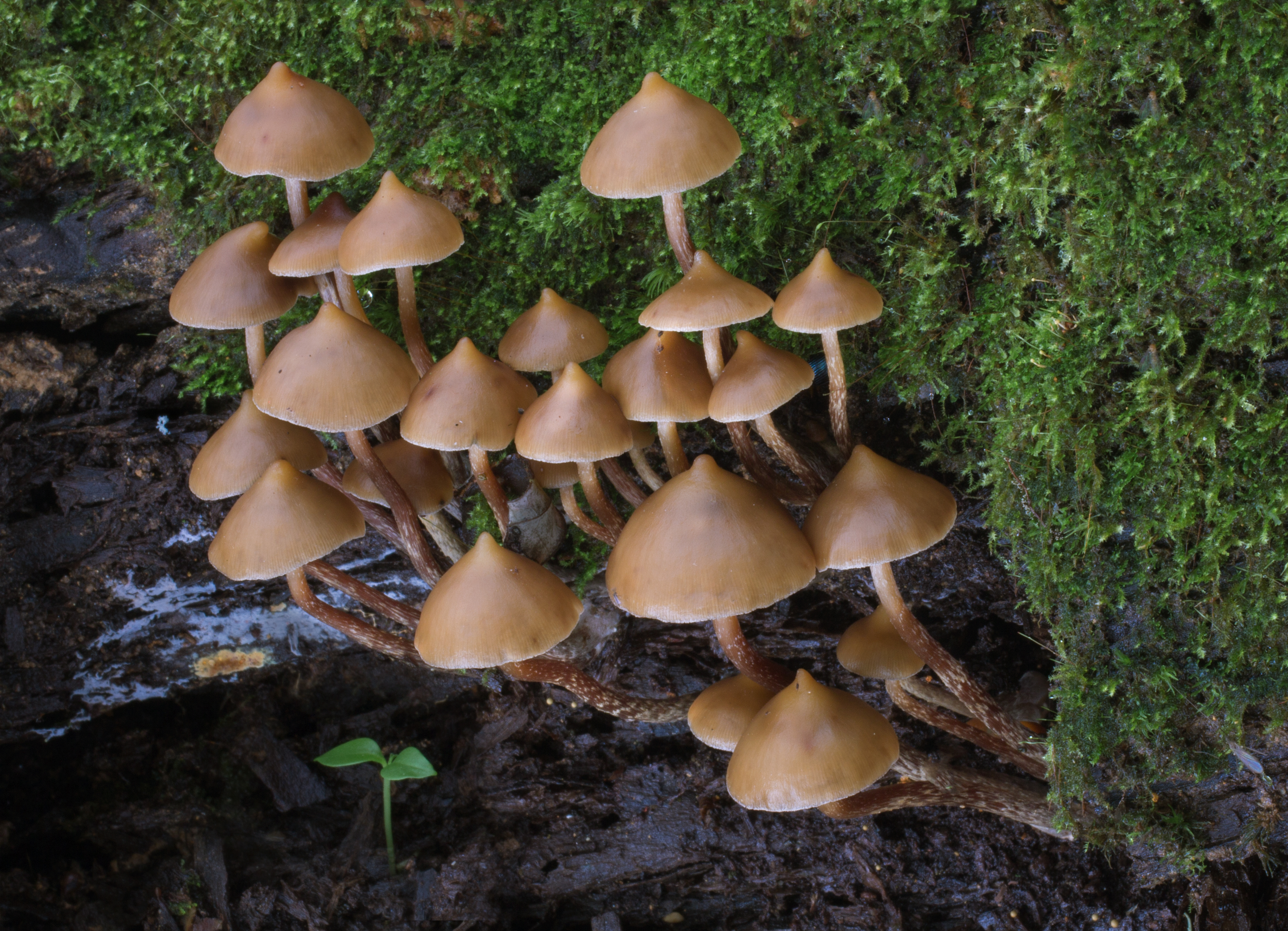
- Found in Jalisco, Mexico

Scientific classification
- Kingdom: Fungi
- Division: Basidiomycota
- Class: Agaricomycetes
- Order: Agaricales
- Family: Hymenogastraceae
- Genus: Psilocybe
- Species: P. yungensis

Binomial name
- Psilocybe yungensis Singer & A.H. Sm. (1958)

Synonyms
- Psilocybe yungensis var. diconica A.H. Sm. (1958); Psilocybe acutissima Heim (1959); Psilocybe chiapanensis Guzmán (1995); Psilocybe isauri Singer (1959); Psilocybe subyungensis Guzmán (1978)

= Psilocybe yungensis =

Species of fungus

Psilocybe yungensis
- Mycological characteristics
- Gills on hymenium
- Cap is conical or campanulate
- Hymenium is adnate or adnexed
- Stipe is bare
- Spore print is purple-brown
- Ecology is saprotrophic
- Edibility is psychoactive

Psilocybe yungensis is a species of psychedelic mushroom in the family Hymenogastraceae. In North America, it is found in northeast, central and southeastern Mexico. In South America, it has been recorded from Bolivia, Colombia, and Ecuador. It is also known from the Caribbean island Martinique, and China. The mushroom grows in clusters or groups on rotting wood. The fruit bodies have conical to bell-shaped reddish- to orangish-brown caps that are up to 2.5 cm (1.0 in) in diameter, set atop slender stems 3 to 5 cm (1.2 to 2.0 in) long. The mushrooms stain blue when bruised, indicative of the presence of the compound psilocybin. Psilocybe yungensis is used by Mazatec Indians in the Mexican State of Oaxaca for entheogenic purposes.

== Taxonomy and classification ==
The species was described as new to science by mycologists Rolf Singer and Alexander H. Smith, based on specimens collected in Nor Yungas Province, Bolivia, on the road to La Paz to Coroico. They published a short description in Latin in a 1958 Mycologia publication, followed by a more detailed description in English later that year. According to Psilocybe specialist Gastón Guzmán, the species Psilocybe acutissima (described by Roger Heim in 1959), and Psilocybe isauri (described by Singer in 1959) are synonyms, as both the macroscopic and microscopic features are the same in the type material of all three. Singer considered P. isauri a species distinct from P. yungensis because of differences in the hairiness of the stem surface. Smith named the variety P. yungensis var. diconica for specimens he found with conical, rather than obconical (the form of an inverted cone) papilla. Similarly, the main distinguishing feature that Heim ascribed to P. acutissima was a papillate cap (somewhat resembling the shape of a female human breast). Later studies showed that these morphological variations did not warrant individual recognition, because of the variable nature of these characteristics, and the existence of intermediate forms.

Guzmán places P. yungensis in the section Cordisporae, a grouping of Psilocybe species characterized primarily by having rhomboid spores less than 8 micrometers long. The specific epithet yungensis refers to the name of the type locality. The natives of Huautla de Jiménez and Mixe natives call P. yungensis a hongo adivinador ("divinatory mushroom"), hong que adormece ("soporific mushroom"), or hongo genio ("genius mushroom").

== Description ==
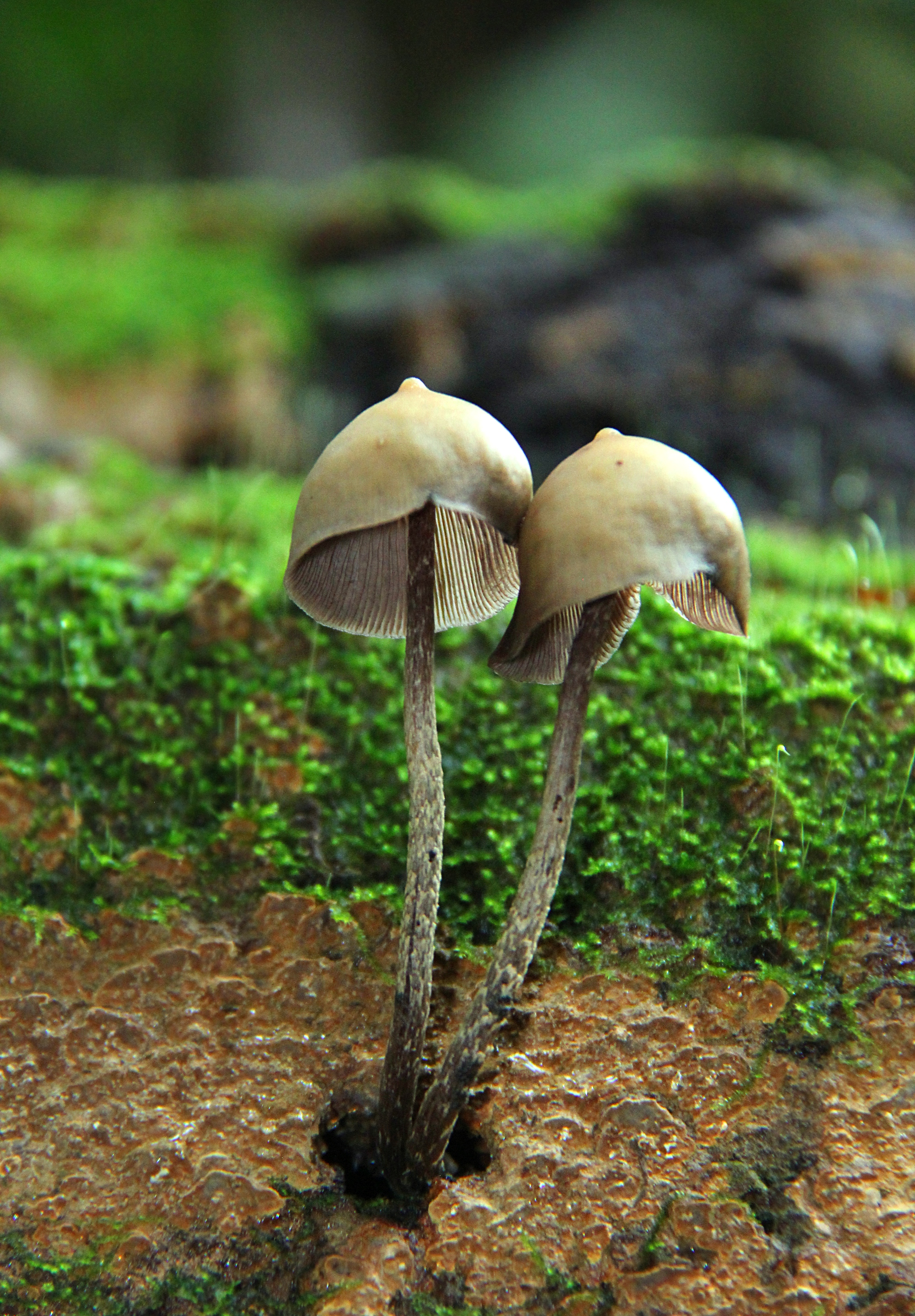
Caps range in shape from conical to bell-shaped, and have a prominent umbo. Stems are densely covered with whitish fibrils pressed flat against the surface.

The P. yungensis fruit bodies have caps that are conical to bell-shaped in maturity, and reach a diameter of up to 2.5 cm (1.0 in). The cap surface is smooth and sticky, and, in moist specimens, has faint radial striations (grooves) that extend almost to the margin. The color of fresh caps ranges from dark reddish-brown to rusty brown to orangish-brown. Additionally, the cap is hygrophanous, meaning it will change color depending on its state of hydration; a dry cap fades to become dull yellowish-brown or the color of "dingy straw". The cap frequently has a prominent umbo.

The gill attachment ranges from adnate (broadly attached to the stem) to adnexed (narrowly attached). The spacing of the narrow gills is close to crowded, and the gill color is initially dull gray before maturing spores cause the color to change to purplish-brown. The stem is 3 to 5 cm (1.2 to 2.0 in) long and 1.5 to 2.5 mm (0.06 to 0.10 in) thick, and more or less equal in width throughout its length or slightly larger near the base. The hollow, brittle, stem is pale brown on the upper part, and reddish-brown near the bottom. The stem is densely covered with whitish fibrils that are pressed flat against the surface; the fibrils slough off in maturity to leave a smooth surface. The mushroom has a cortinate partial veil (resembling the webby cortina produced by species of Cortinarius) but it does not last for long; it occasionally leaves behind sparse remnants of tissue hanging on the cap margin and the upper part of the stem. No ring remains on the stem after the veil disappears. All parts of the mushroom will stain blue when injured; these stains will blacken as the mushroom dries.

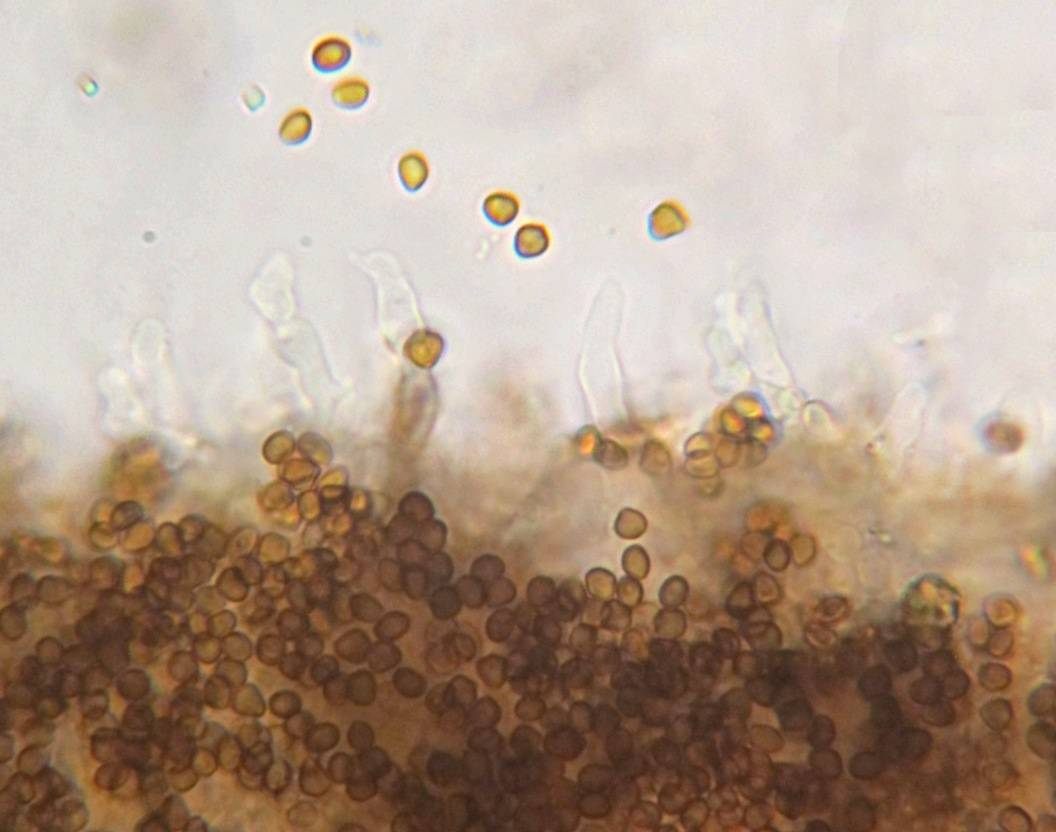
Spores and translucent cheilocystidia

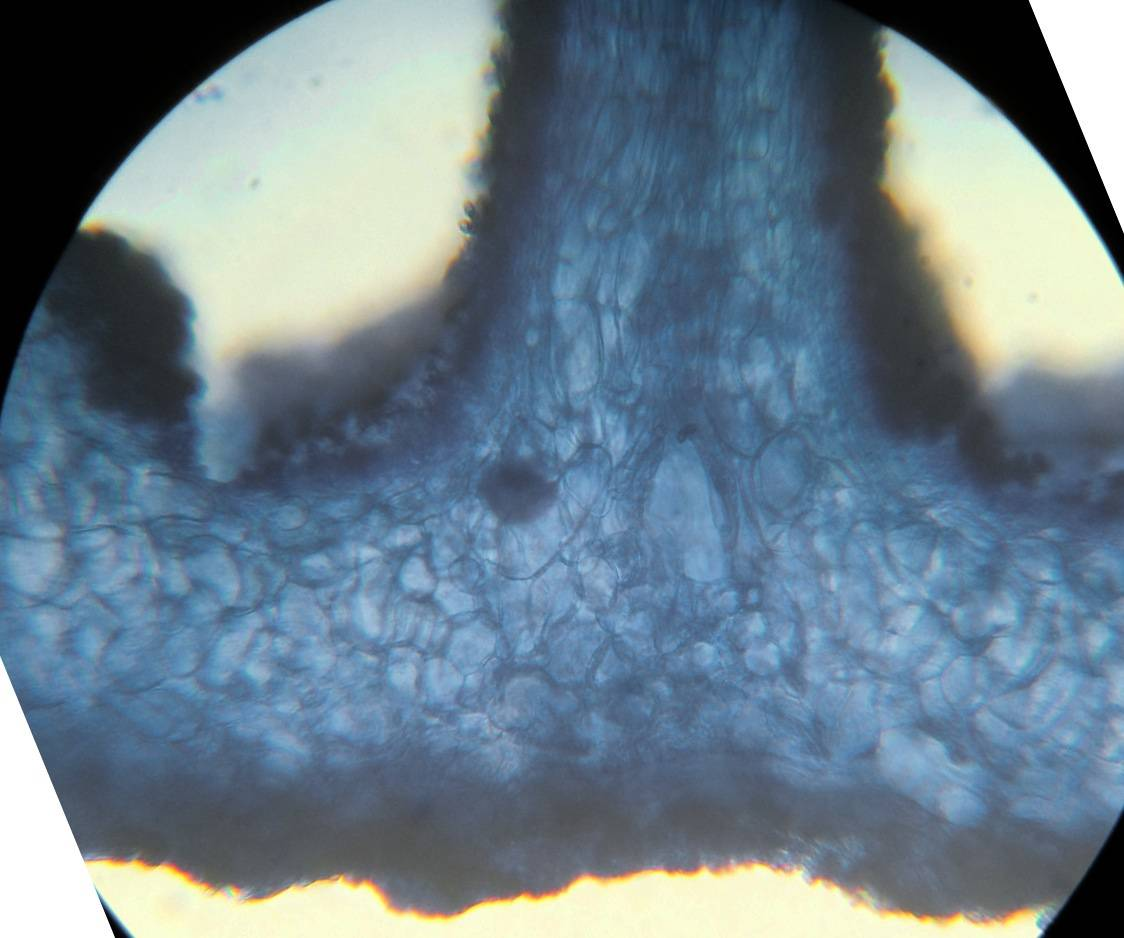
Cap cuticle, cap tissue, and gill tissue at 100x magnification

The spore print is dark purplish-brown. Spores range in shape from roughly rhomboid to roughly elliptical, and typically have dimensions of 5–6 by 4–6 μm. They are thick-walled and have a large germ pore. The basidia (spore-bearing cells) are club-shaped to swollen, hyaline, usually four-spored (although rarely two- or three-spored forms are present), and measure 13–19 by 4.4–6.6 μm. The pleurocystidia (cystidia on the gill face) are ventricose (swollen) near the base and often mucronate (ending abruptly in a short sharp point) at the apex, and measure 14–25 by 4.4–10.5 μm. The cheilocystidia (cystidia on the gill edge) are variable in shape, and measure 14–40 by 4.4–7.7 μm. Pleurocystidia are relatively sparse, while cheilocystidia are abundant. Clamp connections are present in the hyphae. The application of a drop of potassium hydroxide solution turns both the cap and the stem from brown to blackish.

=== Similar species ===
The species Psilocybe subyungensis, known only from Venezuela, is roughly similar in form, although somewhat smaller, with a cap width of up to 1 cm (0.4 in) in diameter and stem lengths of up to 3.5 cm (1.4 in). In addition to differences in distribution, it can be clearly distinguished from P. yungensis by the larger cystidia: the pleurocystidia measure 8.8–11 by 3.8–5.5 μm, and the cheilocystidia 16.5–25 by 7.7–12 μm. Stamets notes that "Few species resemble P. yungensis", while Michael Beug considers the orangish-brown cap color unusual for a Psilocybe, and compares it to Conocybe.

== Habitat and distribution ==
Psilocybe yungensis is a saprobic species, and contributes to the degradation of organic matter deposited in soils and nutrient cycling in forests where it grows. It typically grows in clusters or groups on rotting wood (rarely on humus); it is less frequently found growing solitarily. It is often reported from coffee plantations, subtropical, or cloud forests, especially those occurring at elevations between 1,000 and 2,000 m (3,300 and 6,600 ft). The species occurs in northeast, central and southeastern Mexico, and has been recorded from several locations in the states of Oaxaca, Puebla, Tamaulipas and Veracruz. It is also known from Bolivia, Colombia, and Ecuador, as well as the Caribbean island Martinique. In 2009, it was reported from China. In Mexico and Colombia, the fungus usually fruits between June and July; in Bolivia, it was recorded appearing during January.

== Uses ==
The fruit bodies of Psilocybe yungensis are used for entheogenic, or spiritual, ritualistic purposes by the Mazatec Indians in the Mexican State of Oaxaca. Some authorities have suggested that P. yungensis is the "tree fungus" reported by Jesuit missionaries of the 17th and 18th centuries, a reddish mushroom that was apparently the source of an intoxicating beverage used by the Yurimagua Indians of Amazonian Peru. There is, however, no established record of hallucinogenic mushroom use in that area, and it is possible that the mushroom could instead be a psychedelic species of the wood-dwelling genus Gymnopilus.

== See also ==
- Legal status of psilocybin mushrooms
- List of Psilocybin mushrooms
- List of Psilocybe species
