= Psilocybe semiangustipleurocystidiata =

Scientific classification
- Domain: Eukaryota
- Kingdom: Fungi
- Division: Basidiomycota
- Class: Agaricomycetes
- Order: Agaricales
- Family: Hymenogastraceae
- Genus: Psilocybe
- Species: P. semiangustipleurocystidiata

Binomial name
- Psilocybe semiangustipleurocystidiata Guzmán, Ram.-Guill. & M.Torres (2004)

Species of fungus

Psilocybe semiangustipleurocystidiata is a species of psilocybin mushroom in the family Hymenogastraceae. Described as new to science in 2004, it is found in Colombia, where it grows on clay soil in a tropical forest environment.

== See also ==
- List of psilocybin mushrooms
- List of Psilocybe species
