= Psilocybe brunneocystidiata =

Scientific classification
- Kingdom: Fungi
- Division: Basidiomycota
- Class: Agaricomycetes
- Order: Agaricales
- Family: Hymenogastraceae
- Genus: Psilocybe
- Species: P. brunneocystidiata

Binomial name
- Psilocybe brunneocystidiata Guzmán & E.Horak (1979)

Species of fungus

Psilocybe brunneocystidiata is a species of psilocybin mushroom in the family Hymenogastraceae. Found in Papua New Guinea, it was described as new to science in 1978 by mycologists Gastón Guzmán and Egon Horak.

== See also ==
- List of Psilocybe species
- List of psilocybin mushrooms
