= Psilocybe ingeli =

Scientific classification
- Kingdom: Fungi
- Division: Basidiomycota
- Class: Agaricomycetes
- Order: Agaricales
- Family: Hymenogastraceae
- Genus: Psilocybe
- Species: P. ingeli

Binomial name
- Psilocybe ingeli B. van der Merwe, A. Rockefeller & K. Jacobs

Mushroom species

Psilocybe ingeli is a species of psilocybin-containing mushroom which was identified in Kwa-Zulu Natal, South Africa and was described along with Psilocybe maluti in 2024. Psilocybe ingeli is named after the Ingeli mountain range, where the type specimen was found. It's a saprobic species, deriving nutrients from decomposing organic matter, a trait common within the genus Psilocybe. It is the second species of psilocybin-containing mushroom to be observed in Africa, following Psilocybe natalensis and preceding Psilocybe maluti. The production of psilocybin in Psilocybe ingeli is thought to serve as a biochemical defense mechanisms against fungal predation, consistent with patterns observed in other members of the genus. Whereas Psilocybe maluti was found to have entheogenic use by local indigenous people where it was discovered, one of the first known instances of hallucinogenic mushroom use by indigenous people in Africa, such use was not described in the case of Psilocybe ingeli. Psilocybe ingeli's closest known relative is Psilocybe keralensis.

== Description ==
The fruiting body is characterized by a hemispheric to convex caramel-brown cap that lightens to gray as it dries and shows blue bruising when handled – a reaction typical of psilocybin-producing muthrooms. The gills are light gray when young, darkening to brown as spores mature, and the spores are dark purple-brown. The slender stipe ranges from three to seven centimeters in length, with a white to caramel coloration and a white mycelial base that also bruises blue when damaged.

== See also ==
- List of psilocybin mushroom species
- List of Psilocybe species
- Psilocybin mushrooms
- Psilocybe
