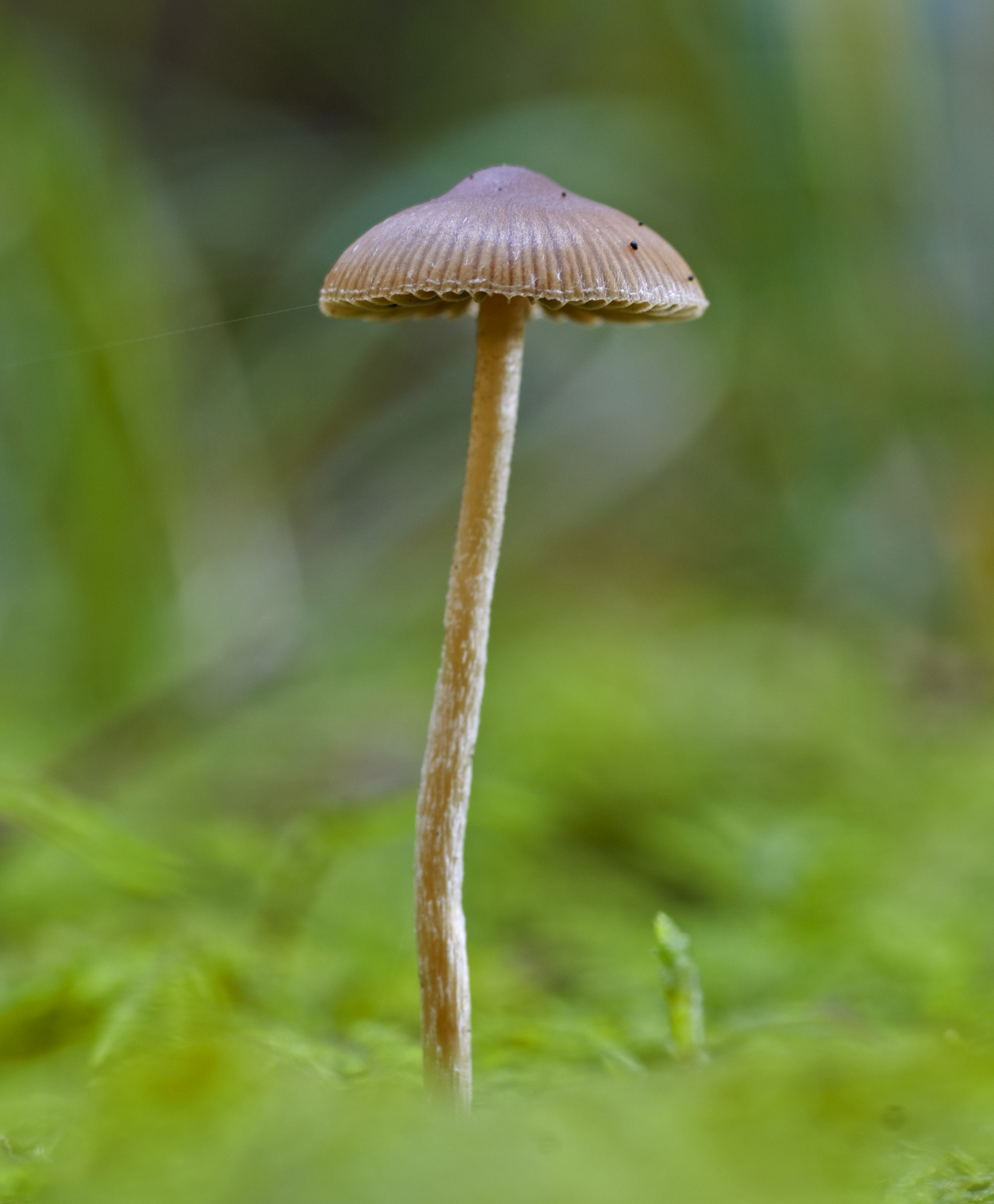

Scientific classification
- Kingdom: Fungi
- Division: Basidiomycota
- Class: Agaricomycetes
- Order: Agaricales
- Family: Hymenogastraceae
- Genus: Psilocybe
- Species: P. medullosa

Binomial name
- Psilocybe medullosa (Bres.) Borovička (2007)

Synonyms
- Naucoria medullosa Bres. (1898); Galerina medullosa (Bres.) Clémençon (1977); Phaeogalera medullosa (Bres.) M.M.Moser (1978)

= Psilocybe medullosa =

Species of fungus

Psilocybe medullosa is a species of psychoactive mushroom. A widespread but rather rare species, it is found in Europe, where it grows as a saprobe on woody debris and detritus. Chemical analysis has been used to confirm the presence of the psychedelic compounds psilocin and psilocybin in the fruit bodies but probably at low levels.

== Taxonomy ==
The fungus was originally described in 1898 as Naucoria medullosa by the Italian mycologist Giacomo Bresadola. The Czech mycologist Jan Borovička transferred it to Psilocybe in 2007. Psilocybe silvatica is its American sister species; it differs by subtle changes in molecular markers (LSU, ITS rDNA, and others).

== Description ==
Psilocybe medullosa produces small, conical to bell-shaped caps (pilei) 1–2 cm across. The surface is slightly viscid but not peelable, with radial striations at the margin and an overall reddish-brown hue that pales slightly toward the edge. It is not strongly hygrophanous, although the colour may fade as it dries. A sparse, ephemeral (temporary) partial veil may be visible as fine fibrils on the cap margin of very young specimens. The gills (lamellae) are moderately crowded, with occasional short gills (lamellulae), ascending and narrowly attached (adnate) to the stipe; they are pale brown with a white edge. The slender stipe measures 5–8 cm by 0.2–0.3 cm, is hollow and slightly sinuous, and is pale brown with a paler tip. Its lower three-quarters are covered in conspicuous white fibrils, and the base often bears a tuft of fine mycelium. The flesh has a faint radish-like (raphanoid) odour.

Microscopically, the spores are smooth, moderately thick-walled and measure 8–11 × 4.5–5.5 micrometres (μm). In face view they are ellipsoid-oblong, while in side view they appear flattened or somewhat almond-shaped, each bearing a small apical pore; they appear yellowish-brown in water and remain unchanged or only very faintly browned in Melzer's reagent. The basidia are four-spored. Cheilocystidia are numerous, 25–40 × 8–12 μm, flask-shaped with a usually narrow, elongated neck that may be straight or curved; pleurocystidia are absent. The cap cuticle (pileipellis) is an ixotrichoderm, consisting of a thin layer of loosely interwoven, gelatinised hyphae. Clamp connections occur throughout the hyphal system.

== Habitat and distribution ==
Psilocybe medullosa is saprotrophic, fruiting in groups (gregariously) among decaying conifer litter—primarily needles and remnants of cones—in moss-rich coniferous woodland. The type collection was made on 14 September 2012 in a mossy spruce forest at Fiera di Primiero, Trentino, northern Italy.

Although first described by Giacomo Bresadola in 1898, this species remains little reported in the Italian funga and has only sporadic published records from Lombardy and neighbouring Switzerland. The Trentino record thus represents one of the few confirmed Italian occurrences and helps to clarify its southern Alpine distribution.

== See also ==
- List of Psilocybe species
- List of psilocybin mushrooms
