= Psilocybe singularis =

Scientific classification
- Domain: Eukaryota
- Kingdom: Fungi
- Division: Basidiomycota
- Class: Agaricomycetes
- Order: Agaricales
- Family: Hymenogastraceae
- Genus: Psilocybe
- Species: P. singularis

Binomial name
- Psilocybe singularis Guzmán, Escalona & J.Q.Jacobs (2004)

Species of fungus

Psilocybe singularis is a species of psilocybin mushroom in the family Hymenogastraceae. Found in Oaxaca, Mexico, where it grows on bare clay soil in mesophytic forest, it was described as new to science in 2004.

== See also ==
- List of Psilocybe species
- List of psilocybin mushrooms
