= Psilocybe brasiliensis =

Scientific classification
- Kingdom: Fungi
- Division: Basidiomycota
- Class: Agaricomycetes
- Order: Agaricales
- Family: Hymenogastraceae
- Genus: Psilocybe
- Species: P. brasiliensis

Binomial name
- Psilocybe brasiliensis Guzmán (1978)

Species of fungus

Psilocybe brasiliensis is a species of psilocybin mushroom in the family Hymenogastraceae. Found in Brazil, it was described as new to science in 1978 by Mexican mycologist Gastón Guzmán.

== See also ==
- List of Psilocybe species
- List of psilocybin mushrooms
