= Psilocybe ruiliensis =

Scientific classification
- Domain: Eukaryota
- Kingdom: Fungi
- Division: Basidiomycota
- Class: Agaricomycetes
- Order: Agaricales
- Family: Hymenogastraceae
- Genus: Psilocybe
- Species: P. ruiliensis

Binomial name
- Psilocybe ruiliensis T. Ma, X.F. Ling & K.D. Hyde (2016)

Species of fungus

Psilocybe ruiliensis is a species of psilocybin mushroom in the family Hymenogastraceae. Described as new to science in 2016, it is found in Yunnan province of southwest China. The species epithet, ruiliensis, is a reference to the location Ruili where the type collections were found. The type specimens were growing solitary to scattered in grasslands in which cows and horses had previously grazed.

== Description ==
- Cap: 10–20 mm (0.39–0.79 in) in diameter; conic to almost plane, with or without umbo or small acutely papillate at the disk; brownish-yellow (often with reddish tinge); hygrophanous and translucently striate when moist, watery brown when wet; sometimes bruising blue when damaged or mature; cortinate white veil and sometimes small scales when young.
- Gills: Yellowish or beige when young, chocolate brown in age (gray-purple or purple tinge), with adnate to subsinuate or adnexed attachment; edges serrulate and slightly wavy.
- Spores: Brown with purple tinge (in water); ellipsoid to subhexagonal; smooth and slightly thick-walled, sometimes containing 1–2 oil drops; 9–11 by 6–7.5 μm.
- Stipe: 27–62 mm (1.1–2.4 in) long, 1.5–3.5 millimetres (0.059–0.138 in) thick; yellow-white to brownish, sometimes bruising bluish when damaged; central or occasionally slightly eccentric; fibrillose; hollow; annulus absent; equal to slightly enlarged bulbous base. Stem base with rhizomorphic white mycelium.
- Odor: Slightly grassy.
- Microscopic features: Larger hexagonal and subrhomboid basidiospores (9.6–12.0 by 6.4–8.4 μm); ventricose-lageniform cheilocystidia and pleurocystidia.

== See also ==
- List of psilocybin mushrooms
- List of Psilocybe species
