= Psilocybe eximia =

Scientific classification
- Domain: Eukaryota
- Kingdom: Fungi
- Division: Basidiomycota
- Class: Agaricomycetes
- Order: Agaricales
- Family: Hymenogastraceae
- Genus: Psilocybe
- Species: P. eximia

Binomial name
- Psilocybe eximia E.Horak & Desjardin (2006)

Species of fungus

Psilocybe eximia is a species of psilocybin mushroom in the family Hymenogastraceae. It is found in Java, Indonesia, where it grows in muddy soil among ferns, grasses, moss, and leaf litter. The fungus was described as new to science in 2006 by mycologists Egon Horak and Dennis Desjardin.

== See also ==
- List of psilocybin mushrooms
- List of Psilocybe species
