= Psilocybe thaiduplicatocystidiata =

Scientific classification
- Domain: Eukaryota
- Kingdom: Fungi
- Division: Basidiomycota
- Class: Agaricomycetes
- Order: Agaricales
- Family: Hymenogastraceae
- Genus: Psilocybe
- Species: P. thaiduplicatocystidiata

Binomial name
- Psilocybe thaiduplicatocystidiata Guzmán, Karun. & Ram.-Guill. (2012)

Species of fungus

Psilocybe thaiduplicatocystidiata is a species of psilocybin mushroom in the family Hymenogastraceae. Found in Chiang Mai University Park (Chiang Mai Province, Thailand), where it grows on soil with rotting dung, it was described as new to science in 2012. The specific epithet thaiduplicatocystidiata refers to its dimorphic pleurocystidia and cheilocystidia, and to Thailand.

== See also ==
- List of Psilocybe species
- List of psilocybin mushrooms
