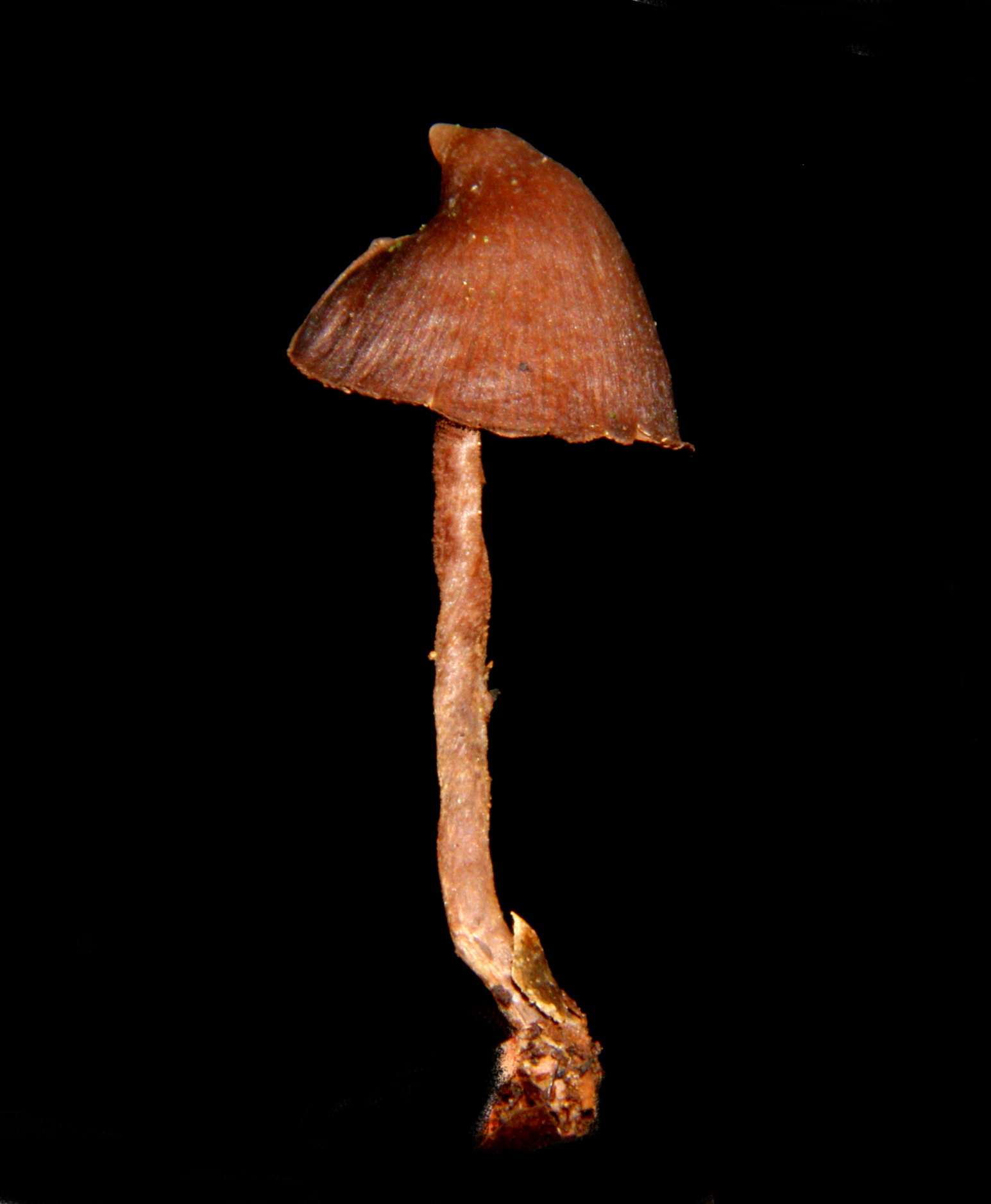

Scientific classification
- Domain: Eukaryota
- Kingdom: Fungi
- Division: Basidiomycota
- Class: Agaricomycetes
- Order: Agaricales
- Family: Hymenogastraceae
- Genus: Psilocybe
- Species: P. heimii

Binomial name
- Psilocybe heimii Guzmán (1978)

Synonyms
- Psilocybe singeri

= Psilocybe heimii =

Species of fungus

Psilocybe heimii is a species of psilocybin mushroom in the family Hymenogastraceae. Described as new to science in 1978 by Gastón Guzmán, it is found in the subtropical forests of Mexico. It is named in honor of French mycologist Roger Heim.

== See also ==
- List of psilocybin mushrooms
- List of Psilocybe species
