= Psilocybe thaiaerugineomaculans =

Scientific classification
- Domain: Eukaryota
- Kingdom: Fungi
- Division: Basidiomycota
- Class: Agaricomycetes
- Order: Agaricales
- Family: Hymenogastraceae
- Genus: Psilocybe
- Species: P. thaiaerugineomaculans

Binomial name
- Psilocybe thaiaerugineomaculans Guzmán, Karun. & Ram.-Guill. (2012)

Species of fungus

Psilocybe thaiaerugineomaculans is a species of psilocybin mushroom in the family Hymenogastraceae. Found in Chiang Mai University Park (Chiang Mai Province, Thailand), where it grows on cow dung, it was described as new to science in 2012. The specific epithet thaiaerugineomaculans refers to its similarity to Psilocybe aerugineomaculans, and to Thailand.

== See also ==
- List of Psilocybe species
- List of Psilocybin mushrooms
