= Psilocybe natalensis =

Scientific classification
- Kingdom: Fungi
- Division: Basidiomycota
- Class: Agaricomycetes
- Order: Agaricales
- Family: Hymenogastraceae
- Genus: Psilocybe
- Species: P. natalensis

Binomial name
- Psilocybe natalensis Gartz, D.A.Reid, M.T.Sm. & Eicker (1995)

Species of fungus

Psilocybe natalensis is a species of psilocybin mushroom in the family Hymenogastraceae. It is found in South Africa. The specific epithet refers to its type locality in Natal. The species was described as new to science in 1995 by Jochen Gartz, Derek Reid, Michael Smith, and Albert Eicker. It is very closely related to Psilocybe cubensis, and differs in its habitat preference, less persistent annulus and genetic sequence. It also has multiple readings of 4 on the scales often used.

== See also ==
- List of psilocybin mushrooms
- List of Psilocybe species
- Psilocybe ingeli
- Psilocybe ochraceocentrata
