= Psilocybe ferrugineolateritia =

Scientific classification
- Domain: Eukaryota
- Kingdom: Fungi
- Division: Basidiomycota
- Class: Agaricomycetes
- Order: Agaricales
- Family: Hymenogastraceae
- Genus: Psilocybe
- Species: P. ferrugineolateritia

Binomial name
- Psilocybe ferrugineolateritia Vogl.

Species of fungus

Psilocybe ferrugineolateritia is a dark-spored agaric mushroom first described by the American mycologist Alexander H. Smith in an article titled "New and unusual dark-spored agarics from North America", published in the Journal of the Mitchell Society in December 1946.
