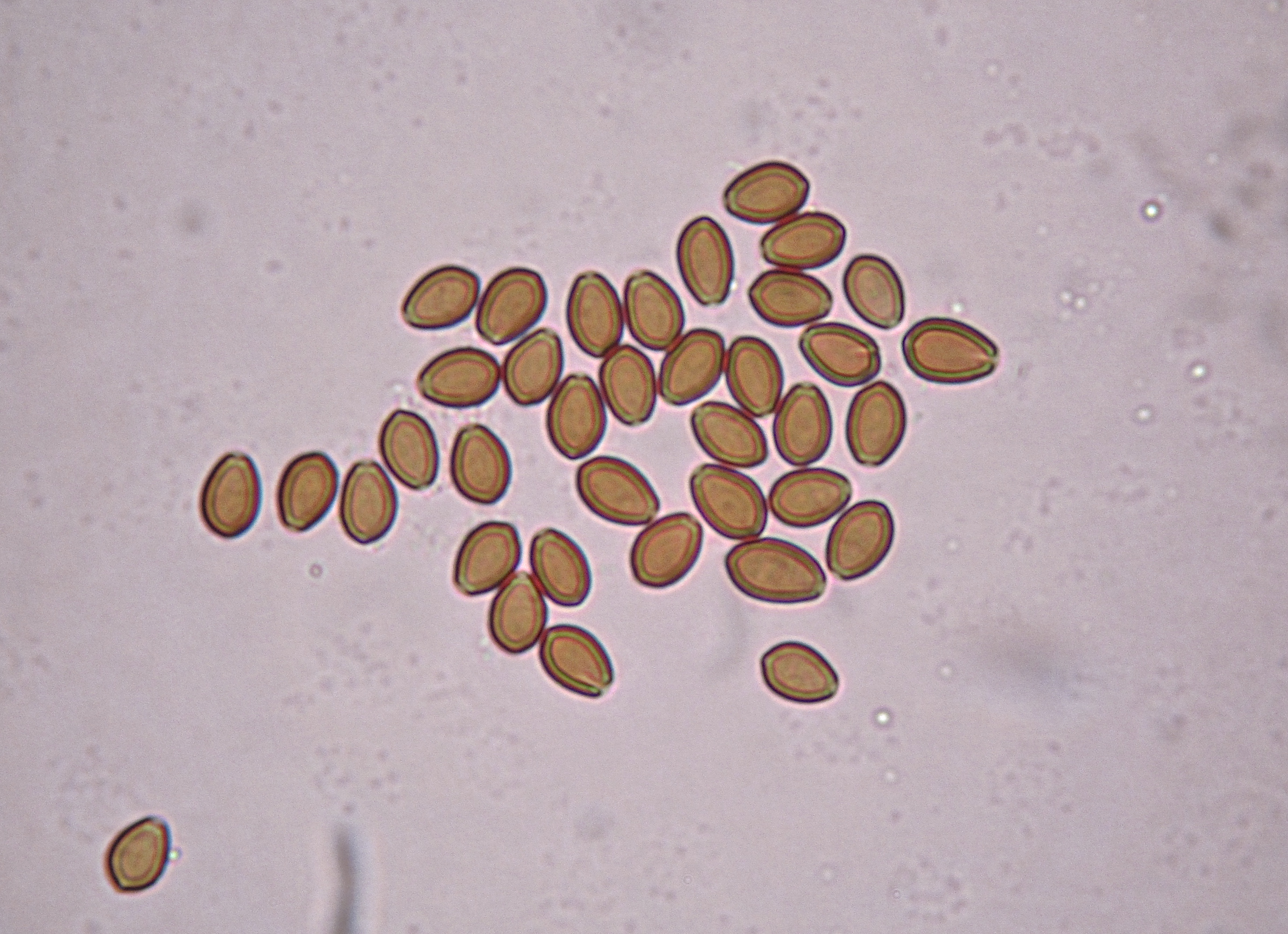

Scientific classification
- Domain: Eukaryota
- Kingdom: Fungi
- Division: Basidiomycota
- Class: Agaricomycetes
- Order: Agaricales
- Family: Hymenogastraceae
- Genus: Psilocybe
- Species: P. meridionalis

Binomial name
- Psilocybe meridionalis Guzmán, Ram.-Guill. & Guzm.-Dáv.

= Psilocybe meridionalis =

Species of fungus

Psilocybe meridionalis Mycological characteristics
- Gills on hymenium
- Cap is conical or convex
- Hymenium is adnate or adnexed
- Stipe is bare
- Spore print is purple-brown
- Ecology is saprotrophic
- Edibility is psychoactive

Psilocybe meridionalis is a psychedelic mushroom which has psilocybin and psilocin as main active compounds. This mushroom is closely related to Psilocybe stuntzii but can be distinguished by its smaller spores and the presence of pleurocystidia. This is the only species of Psilocybe from section Stuntzii which has been found in Mexico. It is known only from the type location in Neverias, Sierra de Cacoma, Jalisco, Mexico.

== Distribution and habitat ==
Found in Oak and Pine subtropical forests in the western mountains of Jalisco, Mexico. The holotype was collected at 2,200 meters elevation.

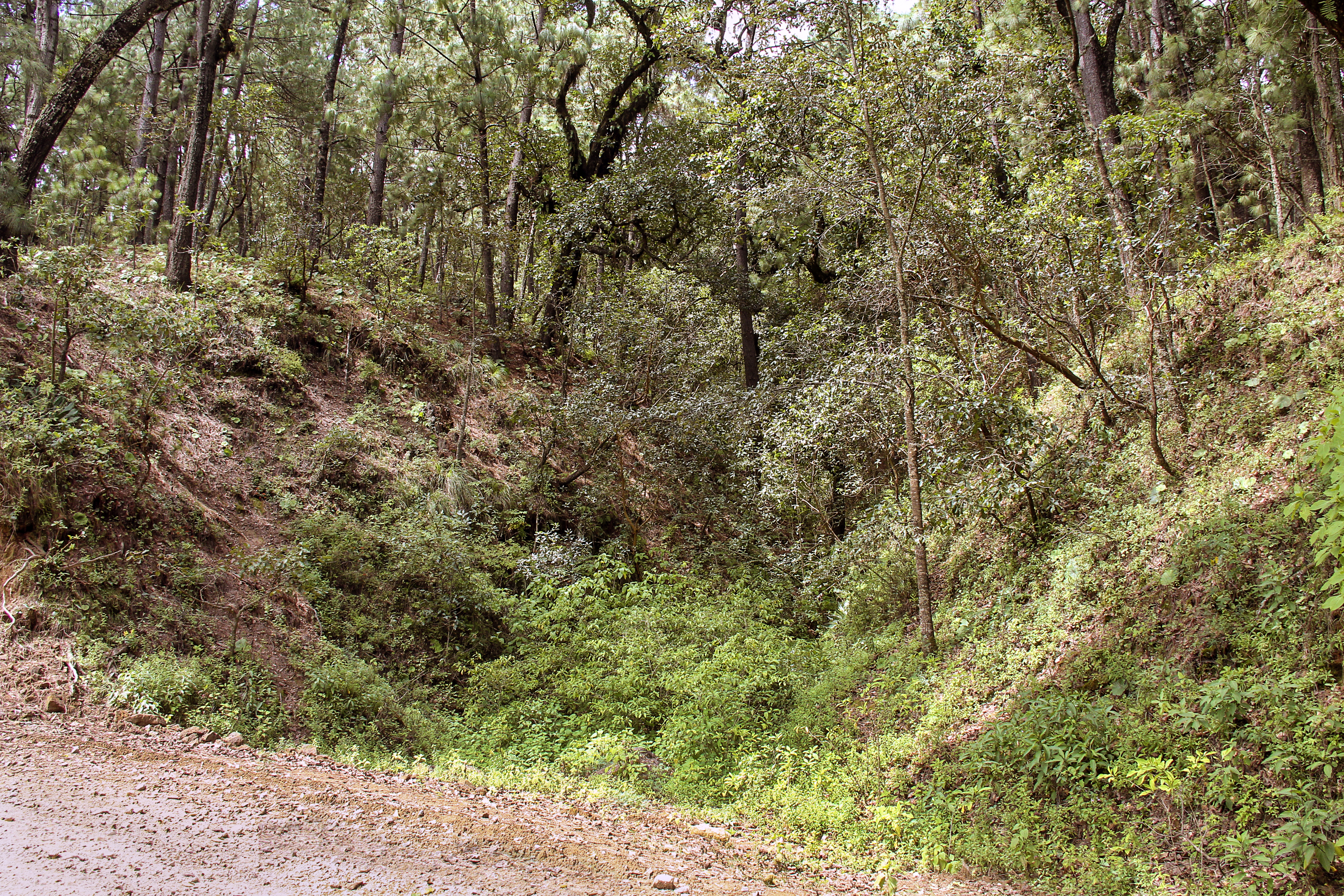
Psilocybe meridionalis type location
