= Psilocybe plutonia =

Scientific classification
- Kingdom: Fungi
- Division: Basidiomycota
- Class: Agaricomycetes
- Order: Agaricales
- Family: Hymenogastraceae
- Genus: Psilocybe
- Species: P. plutonia

Binomial name
- Psilocybe plutonia (Berk. & M.A. Curtis) Sacc.

Synonyms
- Agaricus plutonia

Species of fungus

Psilocybe plutonia
- Mycological characteristics
- Gills on hymenium
- Cap is umbonate
- Hymenium is adnexed
- Stipe is bare
- Spore print is purple-brown
- Ecology is saprotrophic
- Edibility is psychoactive

Psilocybe plutonia is a small psilocybin mushroom of the family Hymenogastraceae, believed to contain psilocybin and psilocin. It was first documented from Cuba. An older synonym is Agaricus plutonia.

It is in the section Cordisporae.

== Etymology ==
The word plutonia comes from the Latin words plutonian or plutonic. Perhaps in connection with the dark color of the mushroom.

== Description ==
- Pileus: 0.5–1.5 cm in diameter, conic to convex, with an acute umbo or papilla, not viscid, glabrous, slightly translucent-striate, silky white fibrils when young that fade in age, hygrophanous, lubricious, reddish brown to yellowish brown or clay color, becoming blackish. Flesh thin, brownish.
- Gills: Adnexed, sometimes with a decurrent tooth, thin, light brown to dark brown, blackish in age, edges pallid.
- Spores: Purple brown in deposit, rhomboid or subrhomboid in face view, (3.7)4.5–6(6.7) x 4.5–5.2 μm, thick-walled, with a broad truncate germ pore.
- Stipe: (1.8)2.5–4(5) cm long, 0.5–1.5 mm equal to slightly enlarged at the base, flexuous, hollow, dark brown or reddish brown, apex pruinose, zoned with appressed whitish fibrils. No annulus is formed by the cortinate veil.
- Taste: Unknown.
- Odor: None to slightly farinaceous.
- Microscopic features: Basidia 11–17 μm, pleurocystidia 17–26 μm, cheilocystidia 12–17 x 5–6 μm.

== Distribution and habitat ==
Psilocybe plutonia may be found growing solitary or gregarious, from late June through February, on rotted wood or in soil with woody material, in tropical forests, from Brazil, Colombia, Venezuela and Cuba, often near sea level or in lower elevations, although widely distributed, it is not found often.
