= Psilocybe fasciata =

Scientific classification
- Domain: Eukaryota
- Kingdom: Fungi
- Division: Basidiomycota
- Class: Agaricomycetes
- Order: Agaricales
- Family: Hymenogastraceae
- Genus: Psilocybe
- Species: P. fasciata

Binomial name
- Psilocybe fasciata Hongo (1957)

Species of fungus

Psilocybe fasciata is a species of fungus belonging to the psychedelic Psilocybe genus. It was first documented in 1957 by Japanese mycologist Tsuguo Hongo. It was found growing at the outskirts of a bamboo forest in Japan.
