= Psilocybe uxpanapensis =

Scientific classification
- Domain: Eukaryota
- Kingdom: Fungi
- Division: Basidiomycota
- Class: Agaricomycetes
- Order: Agaricales
- Family: Hymenogastraceae
- Genus: Psilocybe
- Species: P. uxpanapensis

Binomial name
- Psilocybe uxpanapensis Guzmán (1979)

Species of fungus

Psilocybe uxpanapensis is a species of entheogenic mushroom in the family Hymenogastraceae. The mushroom contains the hallucinogenic compounds psilocybin and psilocin. Mexican mycologist Gastón Guzmán described this mushroom in 1979 as a novel species: the first hallucinogenic mushroom to be discovered in an undisturbed tropical forest. Psilocybe uxpanapensis is one of the many tropical species of fungi in Mexico at risk of disappearing due to deforestation.

== See also ==
- List of psilocybin mushrooms
- Psilocybin mushrooms
