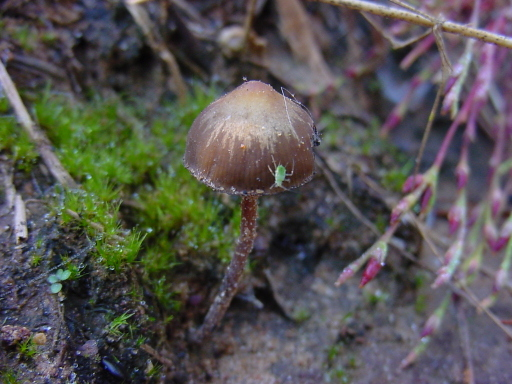

Scientific classification
- Kingdom: Fungi
- Division: Basidiomycota
- Class: Agaricomycetes
- Order: Agaricales
- Family: Hymenogastraceae
- Genus: Psilocybe
- Species: P. atlantis

Binomial name
- Psilocybe atlantis Guzmán, Hanlin & C.White (2003)
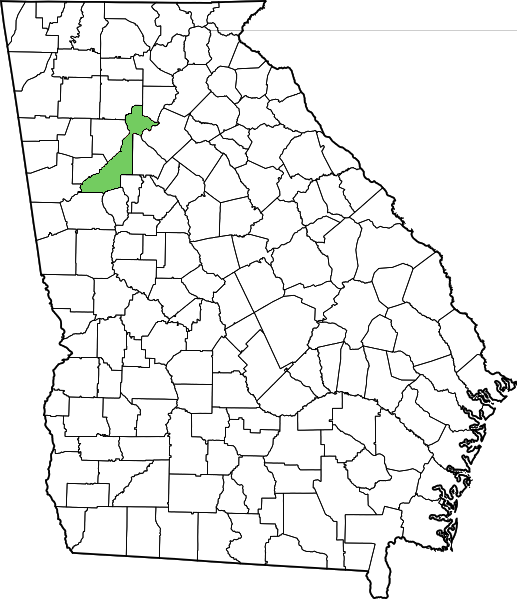
- Range of Psilocybe atlantis

= Psilocybe atlantis =

Species of fungus

Psilocybe atlantis
- Mycological characteristics
- Gills on hymenium
- Cap is conical or convex
- Hymenium is adnate
- Stipe is bare
- Spore print is purple-brown
- Ecology is saprotrophic
- Edibility is psychoactive

Psilocybe atlantis is a rare psychedelic mushroom that contains psilocybin and psilocin as main active compounds. It is a close relative of Psilocybe mexicana and has been recorded only from Georgia.

== Description ==
The cap is 2.5–4 cm in diameter, conic to convex, and smooth to slightly striate, sometimes with a small umbo. The cap surface is pale brown to reddish brown in color, hygrophanous, and bruises blue where damaged.
Its gills are subadnate, thin, and brown.
The stipe is 5 cm by .3 cm. It has an equal structure and is brownish with small brown scales, especially towards the base. The stipe also bruises blue where damaged.
Psilocybe atlantis spores are 9 x 6 x 5.5 μm with a broad germ pore.

== Distribution and habitat ==
Psilocybe atlantis has been found in grassy lawns and vacant lots in Fulton County, Georgia.

The original find was made in Fulton County Georgia, growing in a patch of moss beside a 5 year old home whose lot bordered a wooded area within 50 meters of a tributary of the Chattahoochee river.

== Gallery ==
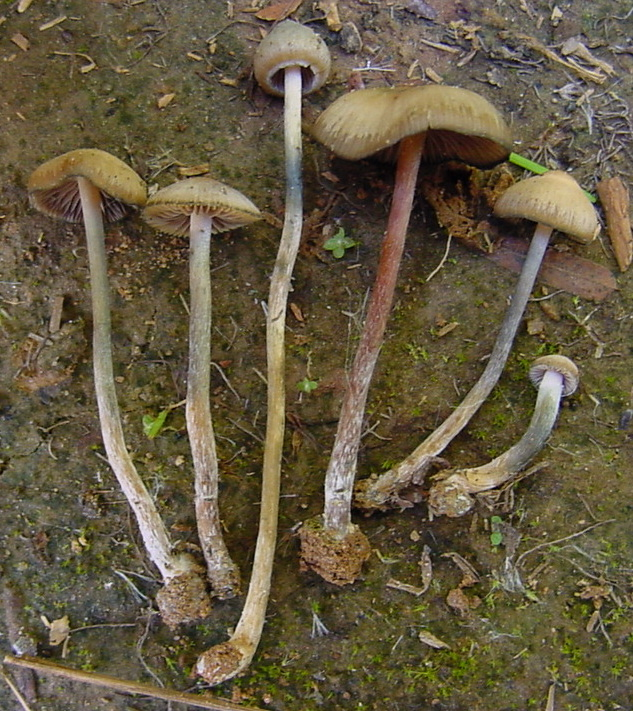
Psilocybe atlantis

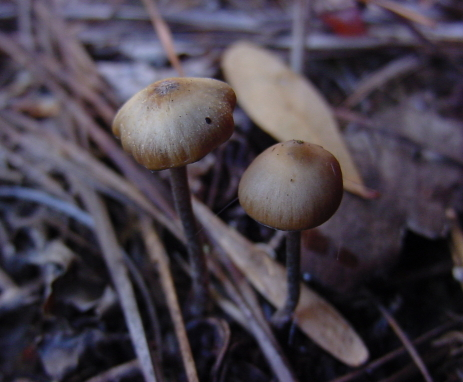
Psilocybe atlantis

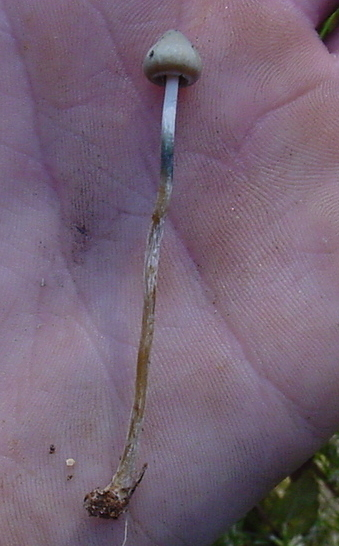
Psilocybe atlantis

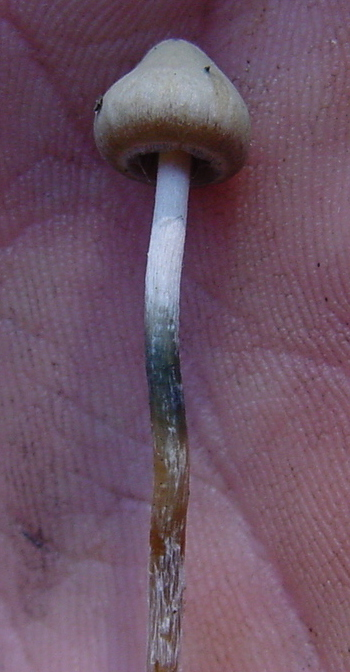
Psilocybe atlantis

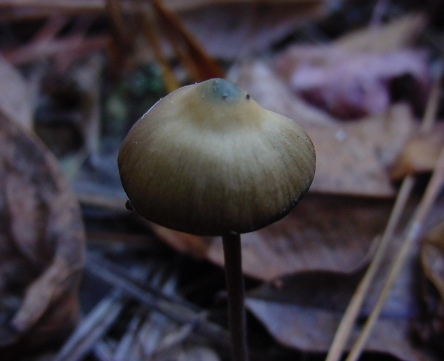
Psilocybe atlantis

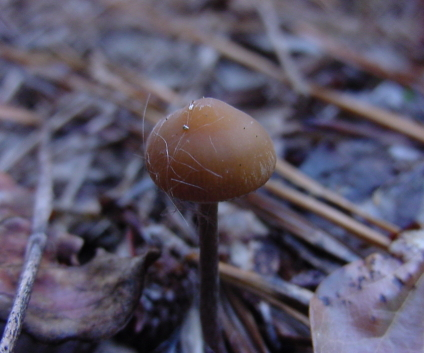
Psilocybe atlantis

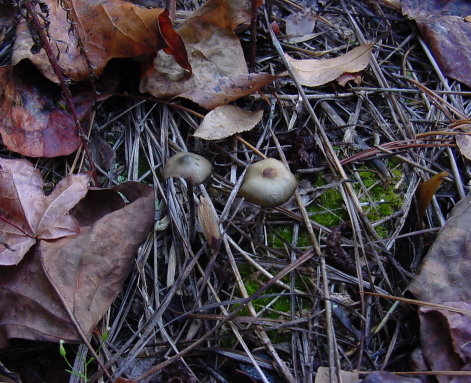
Psilocybe atlantis

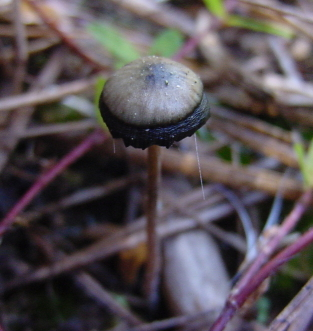
Psilocybe atlantis
