= Šebek =

Šebek (feminine: Šebková) is a Czech and Slovak surname. It is derived from the given name Šebestián, which is a Czech and Slovak form of Sebastian. Notable people with the surname include:

- Lukáš Šebek (born 1988) Slovak footballer
- Nick Sebek (1927–2007) American football quarterback
- Zdeněk Šebek (born 1959) Czech paralympic archer
