= Psilocybe verae-crucis =

Scientific classification
- Domain: Eukaryota
- Kingdom: Fungi
- Division: Basidiomycota
- Class: Agaricomycetes
- Order: Agaricales
- Family: Hymenogastraceae
- Genus: Psilocybe
- Species: P. verae-crucis

Binomial name
- Psilocybe verae-crucis Guzmán & Pérez Ortiz

Species of fungus

Psilocybe verae-crucis is a species of mushroom in the family Hymenogastraceae.
