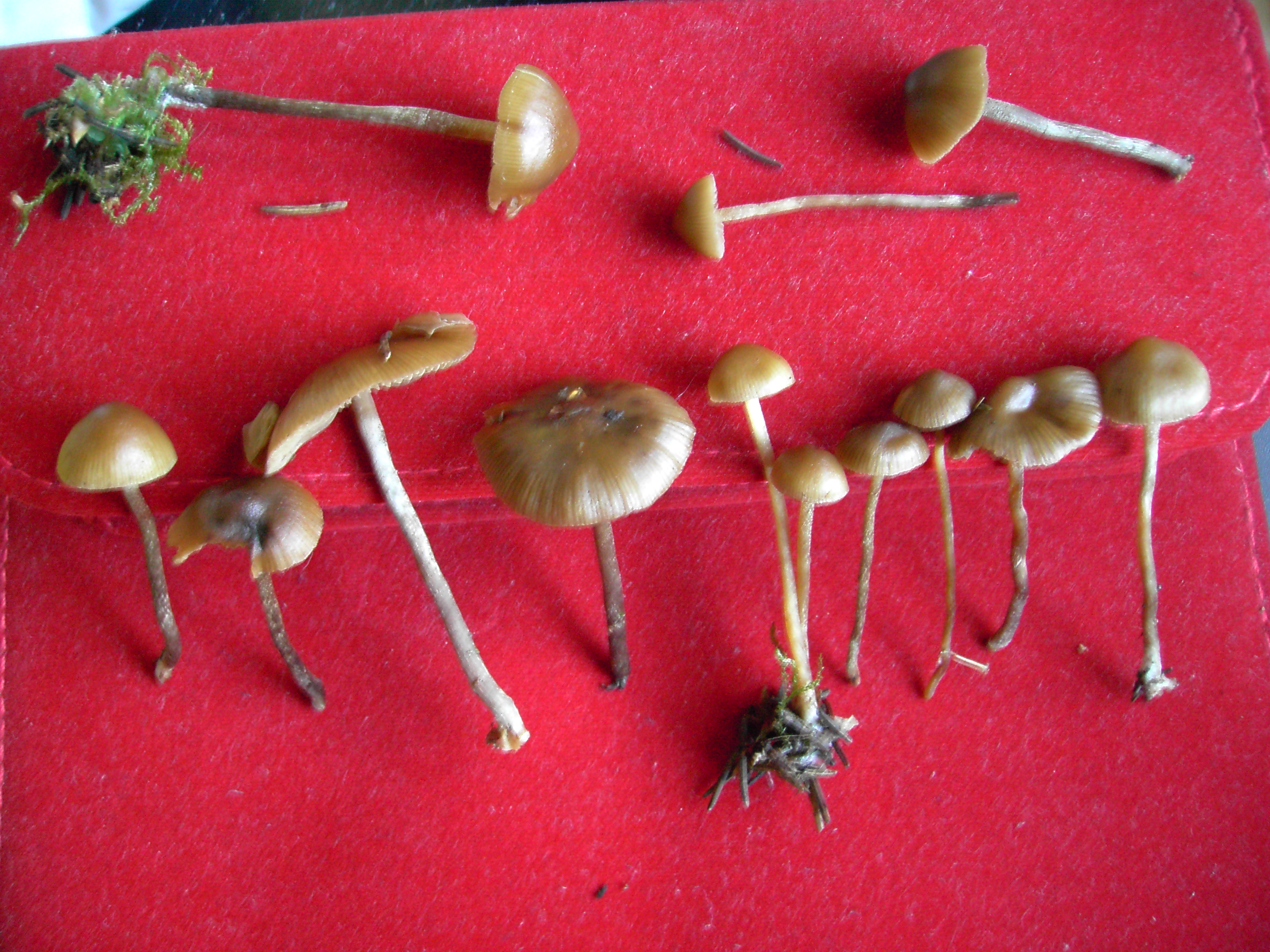

Scientific classification
- Kingdom: Fungi
- Division: Basidiomycota
- Class: Agaricomycetes
- Order: Agaricales
- Family: Hymenogastraceae
- Genus: Psilocybe
- Species: P. silvatica

Binomial name
- Psilocybe silvatica (Peck) Singer & A.H.Sm. (1958)

Synonyms
- Psathyra silvatica Peck (1889); Pilosace silvaticus (Peck) Kuntze (1898); Hypholoma silvaticum (Peck) A.H.Sm. (1941)

= Psilocybe silvatica =

Species of fungus

Psilocybe silvatica is a psilocybin mushroom in the section Semilanceatae of the genus Psilocybe.

== Taxonomy ==
The fungus was first described by American mycologist Charles Horton Peck in 1889 as Psathyra silvatica. Rolf Singer and Alexander H. Smith transferred it to Psilocybe in 1958.
