= Gastón Guzmán =

Mexican mycologist

Gastón Guzmán Huerta
- Born: 26 August 1932; Xalapa, Veracruz, Mexico
- Died: 12 January 2016 (aged 83); Guadalajara, Mexico
- Education: National Polytechnic Institute
- Known for: Authority on the genus Psilocybe; co-founding the Mexican and Latin American Mycological Societies
- Notable work: The Genus Psilocybe: A Systematic Revision... (1983)
- Scientific career
- Fields: Mycology, Anthropology
- Workplaces: Ecological Institute of Xalapa, National School of Biological Sciences (ENCB)
- Author abbrev. (botany): Guzmán

Gastón Guzmán Huerta (26 August 1932 – 12 January 2016), a Mexican mycologist and anthropologist, was an authority on the genus Psilocybe.

== Career ==
He was born in Xalapa, Veracruz, in 1932. His interest in mycology began in 1955 when as a graduate student he decided to update his school's (National Polytechnic Institute) poorly kept collection of fungi. During his early field work he found a large assortment of species about which little was known at the time. This inspired him to choose fungi as the topic of his professional thesis.

In 1957 Guzmán was invited by the University of Mexico to assist Rolf Singer, who would arrive to Mexico the following year to study the hallucinogenic mushroom genus Psilocybe. Guzmán accepted and assisted Singer through his explorations in Mexico. While they were in the Huautla de Jiménez region, in their last day of the expeditions, they met R. Gordon Wasson. For Guzmán it was a "fructiferous meeting."

In 1958, he published his first paper on a blue-staining Psilocybe species and the first paper on the ecology of neurotropic fungi. In 1971, he received a grant from the Guggenheim Foundation of New York City, on the recommendation of Richard Evans Schultes to study the genus Psilocybe, which resulted in a comprehensive monograph on the subject in 1983, titled The Genus Psilocybe: A Systematic Revision of the Known Species Including the History, Distribution and Chemistry of the Hallucinogenic Species. He also authored eight other books and over 350 papers on Mexican mushrooms and has described more than 200 new taxa of fungi worldwide. More than half of the known psilocybin mushroom species were first described by Guzmán and his collaborators.

A co-founder and former president of the Mexican Mycological Society (1965), he was also president of the Latin American Mycological Association (2000–2002), founded by him in La Habana, Cuba, in 1990. Guzmán held an emeritus research chair at the Ecological Institute of Xalapa where he founded the Department and Herbarium of Fungi which now has more than 50,000 specimens. In 1955 he founded the Mycological Herbarium at the National School of Biological Sciences (ENCB) in Mexico City. ENCB now has more than 100,000 specimens, the most sizable collection in Mexico.

== Personal life ==
Guzmán's daughter, Laura Guzmán Dávalos, is also a prominent mycologist. She founded the Mycology Department at the University of Guadalajara.

Guzmán died of a heart attack in Guadalajara, Mexico on 12 January 2016, at the age of 83.

== Eponymy ==
Several fungus species have been named in Guzmán's honor:

- Crepidotus guzmanii Singer 1973
- Fistulina guzmanii Brusis 1973
- Marasmiellus guzmanii Singer 1973
- Pseudohiatula guzmaniana Singer 1973
- Marasmius guzmanianus Singer 1976
- Neotremella guzmanii Lowy 1979
- Psilocybe guzmanii Natarajan & Raman 1983
- Amanita guzmanii Cifuentes, Villegas & G.Santiago 1984
- Entoloma guzmanii Courtec. 1986
- Antromycopsis guzmanii Stalpers, Seifert & Samson 1991
- Phylloporus guzmanii Montoya & Bandala 1991
- Pseudocyphellaria guzmanii D.J.Galloway 1992
- Rhizopogon guzmanii Trappe & Cázares 1992
- Camillea guzmanii F.San Martín & J.D.Rogers 1993
- Coralloderma guzmanii A.L.Welden 1993
- Phaeocollybia guzmanii Bandala & Montoya 1994
- Suillus guzmanii G.Moreno, Bandala & Montoya 1997
- Tuber guzmanii Trappe & Cázares 2006
- Calvatia guzmanii C.R.Alves & Cortez 2012
- Cora guzmaniana Moncada, R.-E.Pérez & Lücking 2019

== Selected publications ==
- Guzmán, G. "El hábitat de Psilocybe muliercula Singer & Smith (=Ps. wassonii Heim), agaricáceo alucinógeno mexicano." Revista de la Sociedad Mexicana de Historia Natural 19: 215-229 (1958).
- Guzmán, G. The Genus Psilocybe: A Systematic Revision of the Known Species Including the History, Distribution and Chemistry of the Hallucinogenic Species. Beihefte zur Nova Hedwigia Heft 74. J. Cramer, Vaduz, Germany (1983) [now out of print].
- Guzmán, G. "Les champignons sacrés du Mexique." In: Riedlinger, T.J. (Ed.) The Sacred Mushroom Seeker: Essays for R. Gordon Wasson. Ethnomycological Studies No. 11, pp. 83–110. Dioscorides Press, Portland, OR (1990).
- Guzmán, G. "The Sacred Mushroom in Mesoamerica." In: Miyanishi, T. (Ed.) The Ancient Maya and Hallucinogens, pp. 75–95. Wakayama University, Wakayama, Japan (1992).
- Guzmán, G. "Supplement to the genus Psilocybe." Bibliotheca Mycologica 159: 91-141 (1995).
- Guzmán, G. “Los Nombres de los Hongos y lo Relacionado con Ellos en America Latina.” Instituto de Ecología, Xalapa, Veracruz, Mexico (1997).
- Guzman, G. "Inventorying the fungi of Mexico." Biodiversity and Conservation 7: 365-384 (1997).
- Guzmán, G. and J. Ott. "Description and chemical analysis of a new species of hallucinogenic Psilocybe from the Pacific Northwest." Mycologia 68: 1261-1267 (1976).
- Guzman, G. and S.H. Pollock. "A new bluing species of Psilocybe from Florida." Mycotaxon 7: 373-376 (1978).
- Guzmán, G. and S.H. Pollock. "Tres nuevas especies y dos nuevos registros de los hongos alucinógenos en México y datos sobre su cultivo en el laboratorio." Bol Soc Mex Mic 13: 261-270 (1979).
- Guzmán, G., C. King, and V.M. Bandala. "A new species of Psilocybe of section Zapotecorum from New Zealand." Mycological Research 95(4): 507-508 (1991).
- Guzmán, G., L. Montoya Bello, and V.M. Bandala. "Nuevos registros de los hongos alucinógenos del género Psilocybe en México y análisis de la distribución de las especies conocidas." Revista Mexicana de Micología 4: 255-265 (1988).
- Guzmán, G., V.M. Bandala, and C. King. "Further observations on the genus Psilocybe from New Zealand." Mycotaxon 46: 161-170 (1993).
- Guzman, G., V.M. Bandala, and J.W. Allen. "A new bluing Psilocybe from Thailand." Mycotaxon 46: 155-160 (1993).
- Guzman, G. et al. "A new bluing Psilocybe from U.S.A." Mycotaxon 65: 191-196 (1997).
- Guzmán, G. "Identificación de los hongos comestibles, venenosos, alucinantes y destructores de la madera", Ed. Limusa, Mexico City (with several reprints) (1977).
- Guzmán, G. et al. “Psilocybe s.s. in Thailand: four new species and a review of previously recorded species.” Mycotaxon 119: pp. 65–81 (January–March 2012).
- Guzmán, G. ”New Taxonomical And Ethnomycological Observations On Psilocybe s.s. (fungi, Basidiomycota, Agaricomycetidae, Agaricales, Strophariaceae) From Mexico, Africa And Spain.” Acta Botanica Mexicana 100: 79-106 (2012).
- Guzmán, G. “Hallucinogenic Mushrooms in Mexico: An Overview.” Economic Botany, Volume 62, Issue 3, pages 404-412 (2008).
- Guzmán G. “Sinopsis de los Conocimientos Sobre los Hongos Alucinógenos Mexicanos.” Boletín de la Sociedad Botánica de México 24:14–34 (1959).
- Guzmán, G. “Nueva Localidad de Importancia Etnomicológica de los Hongos Neurotrópicos Mexicanos.” Ciencia, México, 20:85–88 (1960).
- Guzmán, G. “Variation, Distribution, Ethnomycological Data and Relationships of Psilocybe aztecorum, a Mexican Hallucinogenic Mushroom.” Mycologia 70:385–396 (1978).
- Guzmán G. “Traditional Uses and Abuses of Hallucinogenic Fungi: Problems and Solutions.” International Journal of Medicinal Mushrooms 5:57–59 (2003).
- Guzmán, G. “Species Diversity of the Genus Psilocybe in the World Mycobiota, with Special Attention to Hallucinogenic Properties.” International Journal of Medicinal Mushrooms 7:305–331 (2005).
- Guzmán, G. and A. López-González. Nuevo Hábitat y Datos Etnomicológicos de Psilocybe muliercula.” Boletín de la Sociedad Mexicana de Micología 4:44–48 (1970).
- Guzmán, G. et al. “The Taxonomy of Psilocybe fagicola–Complex.” Journal of Microbiology (Korea) 43:158–165 (2005).
- Guzmán, G. et al. “The Hallucinogenic Species of Psilocybe in Colombia, Their Indian Use, New Records, and New Species.” International Journal of Medicinal Mushrooms 6:83–93 (2004).
- Guzmán, G. et al. “Una Iglesia Dedicada al Culto de un Hongo, “Nuestro Señor del Honguito,” en Chignahuapan, Puebla. Boletín de la Sociedad Mexicana de Micología 9:137–147 (1975).
- Guzmán, G. “Aportaciones sobre los hongos alucinógenos mexicanos y descripción de un nuevo Psilocybe.” Ciencia (Méx.) 26: 25-28 (1968).
- Guzmán, G. “Further investigations of the Mexican hallucinogenic mushrooms with descriptions of new taxa and critical observations on additional taxa.” Nova Hedw. 29: 625-644 (1978a).
- Guzmán, G. “Nuevos datos sobre el género Psilocybe y descripción de una nueva especie en México.” Bol. Soc. Mex. Mic. 17: 89-94 (1982).
- Guzmán, G. “Las especies del género Psilocybe conocidas de Veracruz (México).” Acta Bot. Mex. 49: 35-46 (1999).
- Guzmán, G. “New species and new records of Psilocybe from Spain, the U.S.A. and Mexico, and a new case of poisoning by P. barrerae.” Doc. Mycol. 29(116): 41-52 (2000).
- Guzmán, G. “The hallucinogenic mushrooms: Diversity, traditions, use and abuse with special reference to the genus Psilocybe.” In: Misra, J. K. and S. K. Deshhmukh (eds.). Fungi from different environments. Science Pubs., Enfield, UK. (2009).
- Guzmán, G. et al. “New species, new varieties and a new record of Psilocybe from Brazil. Mycotaxon 19: 343-350 (1984).
- Guzmán, G. and M. L. Castro. “Observations on some known species of Psilocybe from Spain and description of a new species.” Bol. Soc. Micol. Madrid 27: 181-187 (2003).
- Guzmán, G. et al. “New hallucinogenic mushrooms in Mexico belonging to the genus Psilocybe. Int. J. Med. Mushrooms 6: 275-286 (2004).
- Guzmán, G. “Halluciongenic, Medicinal, and Edible Mushrooms in Mexico and Guatemala: Traditions, Myths, and Knowledge.” International Journal of Medicinal Mushrooms, 3: 399-408 (2001).
- Guzmán, G. “Supplement to the monograph of the genus Psilocybe.” Taxonomic Monograph of Agaricales. O. Petrini and E. Horak (eds.), Biblioth. Mycol. 159, Cramer, Berlin. 1995.
- Guzmán, G. "Los Hongos de El Edén, Quintana Roo: Introducción a la Micobiota Tropical de México". Instituto de Ecología, Xalapa, México. 316p. 2003.
- Guzmán, G., M. Piepenbring, "Los Hongos de Panamá. Introducción a la identificación de los macroscópicos". Instituto de Ecología, A.C., Xalapa, 372 pp. 2011.

== See also ==
- List of mycologists
- Category:Taxa named by Gastón Guzmán
