= List of psilocybin mushroom species =

Psilocybin mushrooms are mushrooms which contain the hallucinogenic substances psilocybin, psilocin, baeocystin and norbaeocystin. The mushrooms are collected and grown as an entheogen and recreational drug, despite being illegal in many countries. Many psilocybin mushrooms are in the genus Psilocybe, but species across several other genera contain the drugs.

== Genera ==
- Conocybula
- Galerina
- Gymnopilus
- Inocybe
- Panaeolus
- Pluteus
- Psilocybe

== Conocybula ==
- Conocybe siligineoides R. Heim
- Conocybula cyanopus (G.F. Atk.) T. Bau & H. B. Song
- Conocybula smithii (Watling) T. Bau & H. B. Song (Galera cyanopes Kauffman, Conocybe smithii Watling)

== Galerina ==
- Galerina indica K.P.D. Latha & Manim
- Galerina steglichii Besl

== Gymnopilus ==
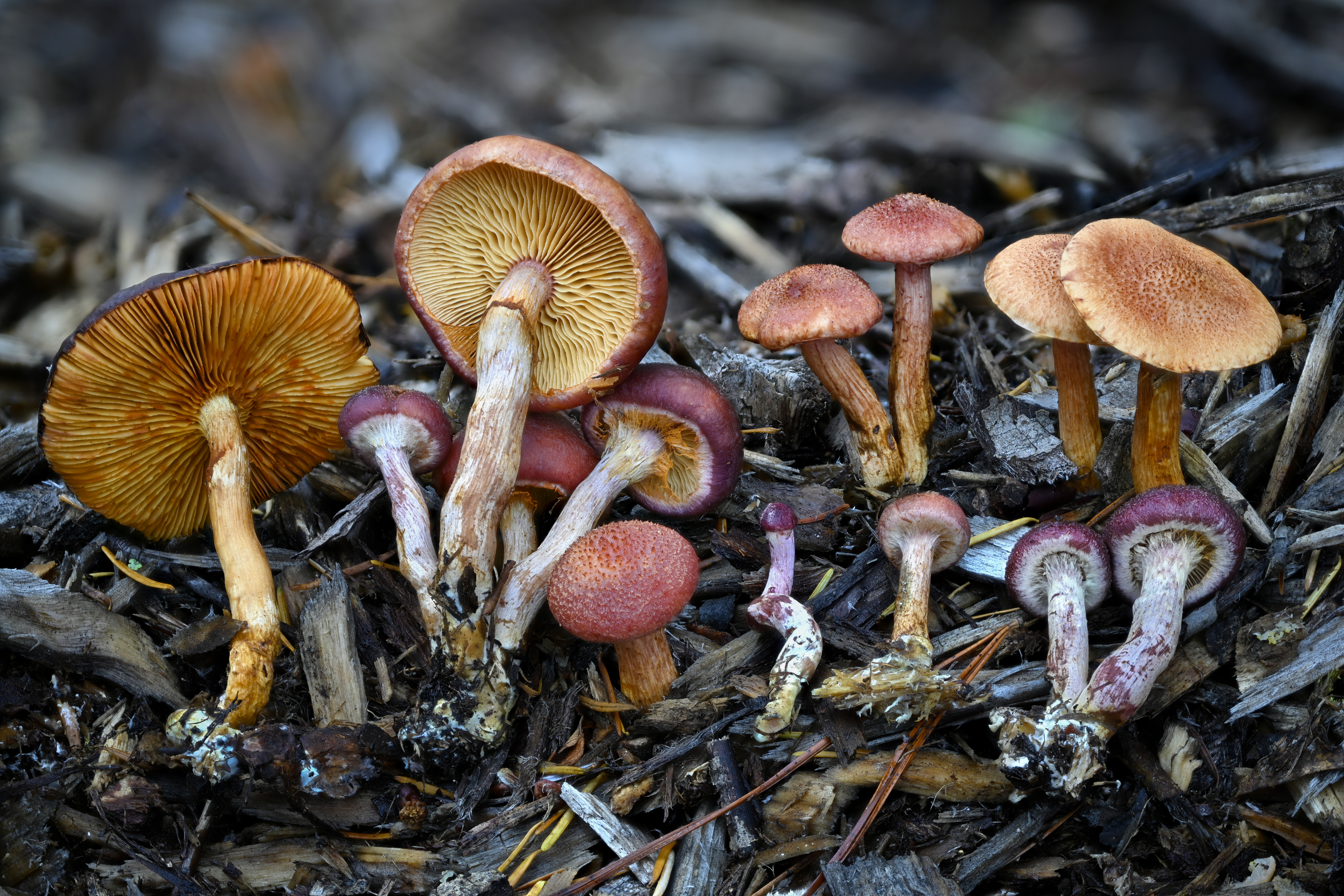
Gymnopilus luteofolius

- Gymnopilus aeruginosus (Peck) Singer (photo)
- Gymnopilus braendlei (Peck) Hesler
- Gymnopilus cyanopalmicola Guzm.-Dáv
- Gymnopilus dilepis (Berk. & Broome) Singer
- Gymnopilus dunensis H. Bashir, Jabeen & Khalid
- Gymnopilus intermedius (Singer) Singer
- Gymnopilus lateritius (Pat.) Murrill
- Gymnopilus luteofolius (Peck) Singer (photo)
- Gymnopilus luteoviridis Thiers (photo)
- Gymnopilus luteus (Peck) Hesler (photo)
- Gymnopilus palmicola Murrill
- Gymnopilus purpuratus (Cooke & Massee) Singer (photo)
- Gymnopilus subpurpuratus Guzmán-Davalos & Guzmán
- Gymnopilus subspectabilis Hesler
- Gymnopilus validipes (Peck) Hesler
- Gymnopilus viridans Murrill

== Inocybe ==
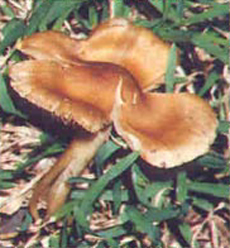
Inocybe aeruginascens

- Inocybe aeruginascens Babos
- Inocybe caerulata Matheny, Bougher & G.M. Gates
- Inocybe coelestium Kuyper
- Inocybe corydalina
  - Inocybe corydalina var. corydalina Quél.
  - Inocybe corydalina var. erinaceomorpha (Stangl & J. Veselsky) Kuyper
- Inocybe haemacta (Berk. & Cooke) Sacc.
- Inocybe tricolor Kühner

Most species in this genus are poisonous.

== Panaeolus ==
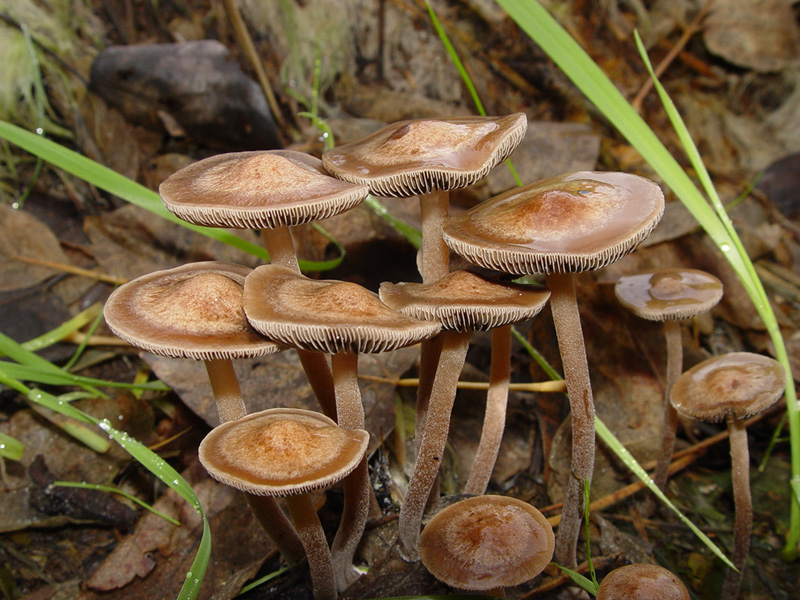
Panaeolus cinctulus

- Panaeolus affinis (E. Horak) Ew. Gerhardt
- Panaeolus africanus Ola'h
- Panaeolus axfordii Y. Hu, S.C. Karunarathna, P.E. Mortimer & J.C. Xu
- Panaeolus bisporus (Malencon and Bertault) Singer and Weeks
- Panaeolus cambodginiensis (OlaĽh et Heim) Singer & Weeks. (Merlin & Allen, 1993)
- Panaeolus chlorocystis (Singer & R.A. Weeks) Ew. Gerhardt
- Panaeolus cinctulus (Bolton) Britzelm.
- Panaeolus cyanescens (Berk. & Broome) Sacc.
- Panaeolus fimicola (Fr.) Gillet
- Panaeolus lentisporus Ew. Gerhardt
- Panaeolus microsporus Ola'h & Cailleux
- Panaeolus moellerianus Singer
- Panaeolus olivaceus F.H. Møller
- Panaeolus rubricaulis Petch (= Panaeolus campanuloides Guzmán & K. Yokoy.)
- Panaeolus tirunelveliensis (Natarajan & Raman) Ew. Gerhardt
- Panaeolus tropicalis Ola'h
- Panaeolus venezolanus Guzmán (= Panaeolus annulatus Natarajan & Raman)

== Pluteus ==
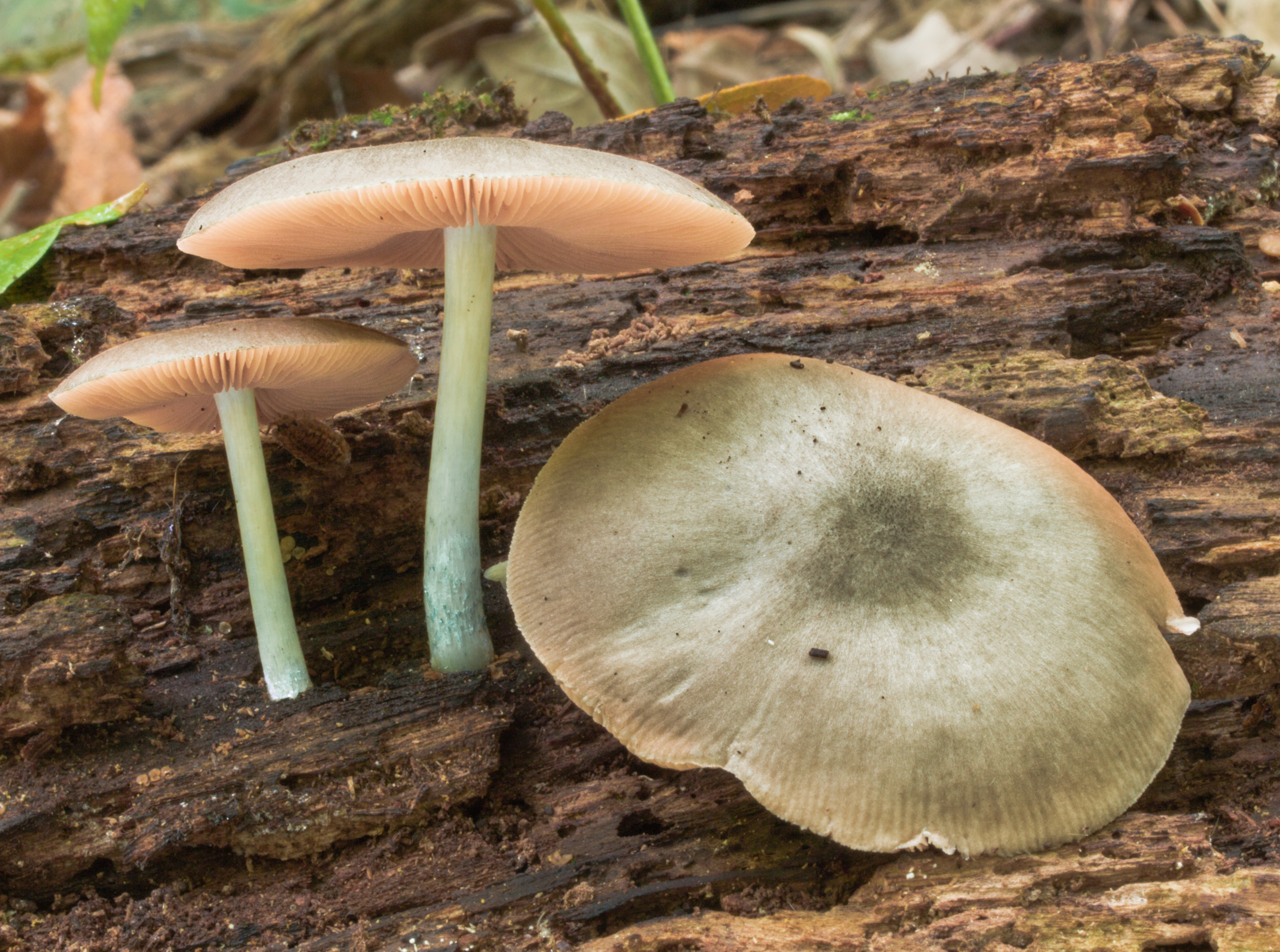
Pluteus americanus

- Pluteus albostipitatus (Dennis) Singer
- Pluteus americanus (P. Banerjee & Sundb.) Justo, E.F. Malysheva & Minnis (2014)
- Pluteus cyanopus Quél.
- Pluteus glaucus Singer
- Pluteus glaucotinctus E. Horak
- Pluteus izurun Arrillaga & Justo 2014
- Pluteus nigroviridis Babos
- Pluteus padanilus Justo & C.K. Pradeep 2014
- Pluteus phaeocyanopus Minnis & Sundb.
- Pluteus salicinus (Pers. : Fr.) P. Kumm.
- Pluteus saupei Justo & Minnis
- Pluteus velutinornatus G. Stev. 1962.
- Pluteus villosus (Bull.) Quél.

== Psilocybe ==
A B C D E F G H I J K L M N O P Q R S T U V W X Y Z

=== A ===
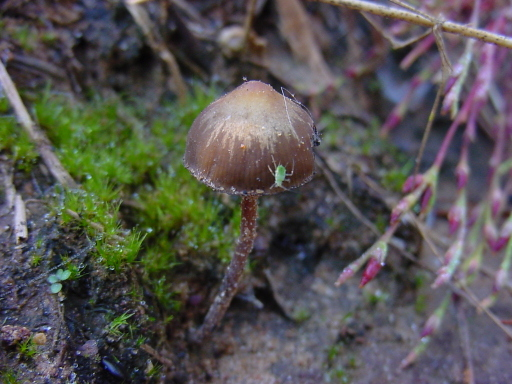
Psilocybe atlantis

- Psilocybe acutipilea (Speg.) Guzmán
- Psilocybe allenii Borov., Rockefeller & P.G.Werner
- Psilocybe alutacea Y.S. Chang & A.K. Mills
- Psilocybe angulospora Yen W. Wang & S.S. Tzean
- Psilocybe antioquiensis Guzmán, Saldarriaga, Pineda, García & Velázquez
- Psilocybe atlantis Guzmán, Hanlin & C. White
- Psilocybe aquamarina (Pegler) Guzmán
- Psilocybe armandii Guzmán & S.H. Pollock
- Psilocybe aucklandiae Guzmán, C.C. King & Bandala
- Psilocybe aztecorum
  - Psilocybe aztecorum var. aztecorum
  - Psilocybe aztecorum var. bonetii (Guzmán) Guzmán
- Psilocybe azurescens Stamets & Gartz

=== B ===
- Psilocybe baeocystis Singer & A.H. Sm. emend. Guzmán
- Psilocybe banderillensis Guzmán
- Psilocybe brasiliensis Guzmán
- Psilocybe brunneocystidiata Guzmán & Horak

=== C ===
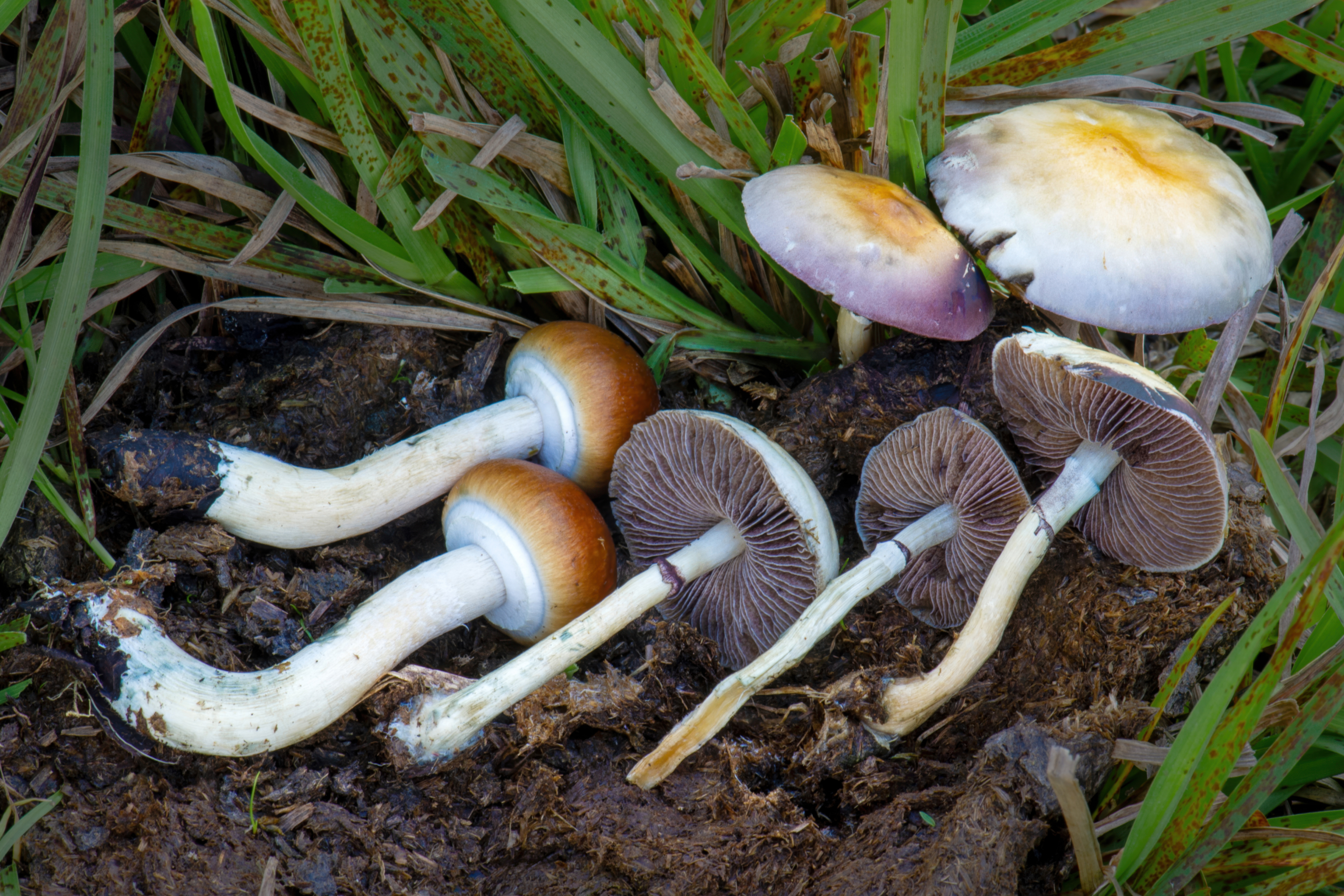
Psilocybe cubensis

- Psilocybe caeruleoannulata Singer ex Guzmán
- Psilocybe caerulescens
  - Psilocybe caerulescens var. caerulescens Murrill
  - Psilocybe caerulescens var. ombrophila (R. Heim) Guzmán
- Psilocybe caerulipes (Peck) Sacc.
- Psilocybe caeruleorhiza Canan, Ostuni, Rockefeller & Birkebak
- Psilocybe carbonaria Singer
- Psilocybe chuxiongensis T.Ma & K.D.Hyde
- Psilocybe collybioides Singer & A.H. Sm.
- Psilocybe columbiana Guzmán
- Psilocybe congolensis Guzmán, S.C. Nixon & Cortés-Pérez
- Psilocybe cordispora R. Heim
- Psilocybe cubensis (Earle) Singer
- Psilocybe cyanescens Wakef.
- Psilocybe cyanofibrillosa Guzmán & Stamets

=== D ===
- Psilocybe dumontii Singer ex Guzmán

=== E ===
- Psilocybe egonii Guzmán & T.J. Baroni
- Psilocybe eximia E. Horak & Desjardin

=== F ===
- Psilocybe fagicola
  - Psilocybe fagicola var. fagicola
  - Psilocybe fagicola var. mesocystidiata Guzmán
- Psilocybe farinacea Rick ex Guzmán
- Psilocybe fimetaria (P.D. Orton) Watling
- Psilocybe fuliginosa (Murrill) A.H. Sm.
- Psilocybe furtadoana Guzmán

=== G ===
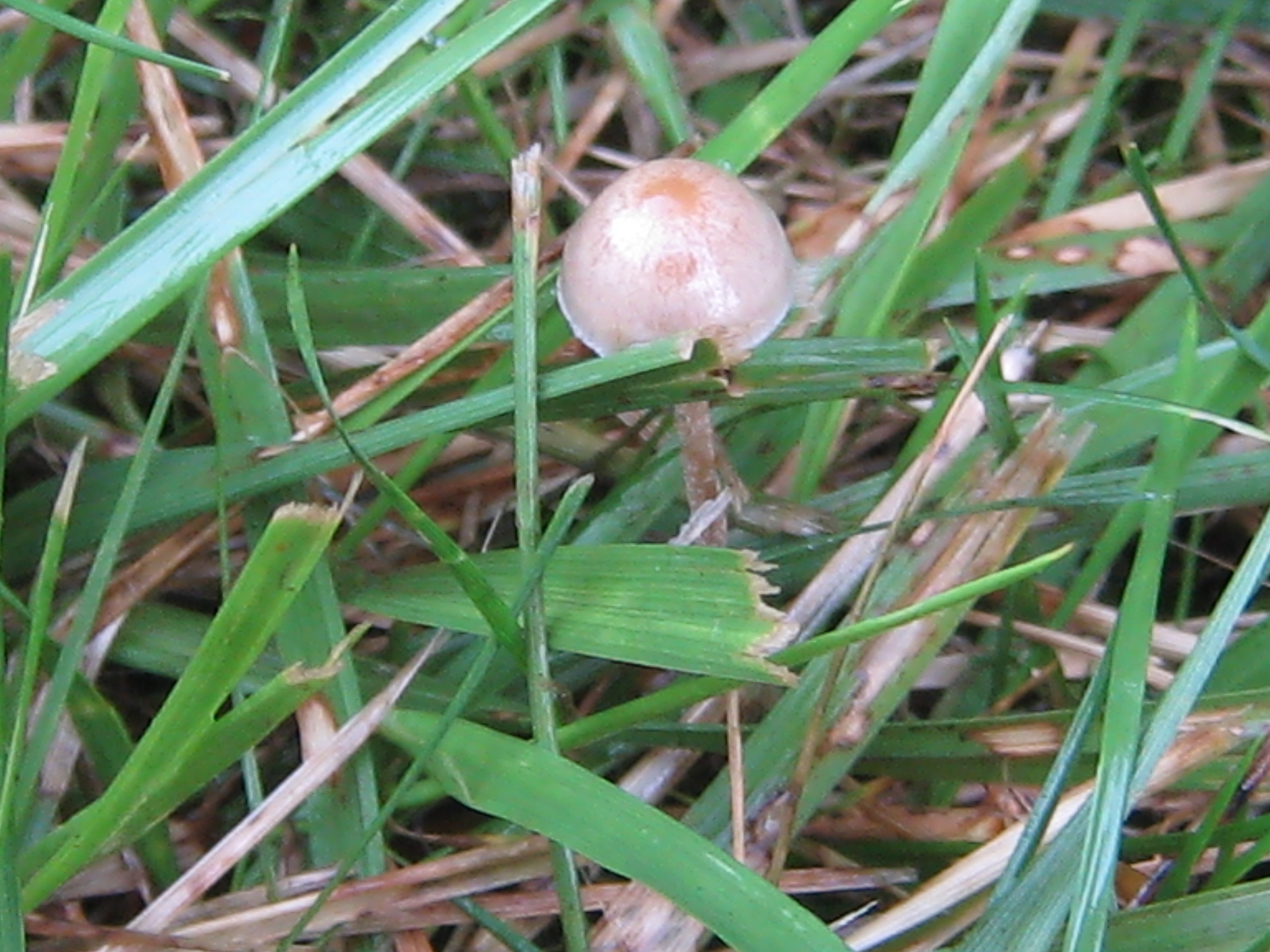
Psilocybe tampanensis

- Psilocybe galindoi Guzmán
- Psilocybe gallaeciae Guzmán & M.L. Castro
- Psilocybe graveolens Peck
- Psilocybe guatapensis Guzmán, Saldarriaga, Pineda, García & Velázquez
- Psilocybe guilartensis Guzmán, Tapia & Nieves-Rivera

=== H ===
- Psilocybe heimii Guzmán
- Psilocybe herrerae Guzmán
- Psilocybe hispanica Guzmán
- Psilocybe hoogshagenii
  - Psilocybe hoogshagenii var. hoogshagenii "(= Psilocybe caerulipes var. gastonii Singer, Psilocybe zapotecorum R. Heim s. Singer)"
  - Psilocybe hoogshagenii var. convexa Guzmán (= Psilocybe semperviva R. Heim & Cailleux)
- Psilocybe hopii Guzmán & J. Greene

=== I ===
- Psilocybe inconspicua Guzmán & Horak
- Psilocybe indica Sathe & J.T. Daniel
- Psilocybe ingeli B. van der Merwe, A. Rockefeller & K Jacobs
- Psilocybe isabelae Guzmán

=== J ===
- Psilocybe jacobsii Guzmán
- Psilocybe jaliscana Guzmán

=== K ===
- Psilocybe kumaenorum R. Heim

=== L ===
- Psilocybe laurae Guzmán
- Psilocybe lazoi Singer
- Psilocybe liniformans
  - Psilocybe liniformans var. liniformans
  - Psilocybe liniformans var. americana Guzmán & Stamets

=== M ===
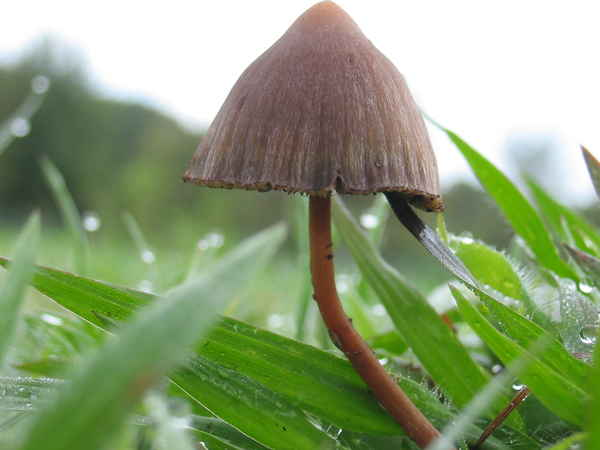
Psilocybe mexicana

- Psilocybe mairei Singer
- Psilocybe makarorae Johnst. & Buchanan
- Psilocybe maluti B. van der Merwe, A. Rockefeller & K. Jacobs
- Psilocybe mammillata (Murrill) A.H. Sm.
- Psilocybe medullosa (Bres.) Borovička
- Psilocybe meridensis Guzmán
- Psilocybe meridionalis Guzmán, Ram.-Guill. & Guzm.-Dáv.
- Psilocybe mescaleroensis Guzmán, Walstad, E. Gándara & Ram.-Guill.
- Psilocybe mexicana R. Heim
- Psilocybe moseri Guzmán
- Psilocybe muliercula Singer & A.H. Sm. (= Psilocybe wassonii R. Heim)

=== N ===
- Psilocybe naematoliformis Guzmán
- Psilocybe natalensis Gartz, Reid, Smith & Eicker
- Psilocybe natarajanii Guzmán (= Psilocybe aztecorum var. bonetii (Guzmán) Guzmán s. Natarajan & Raman)
- Psilocybe neorhombispora Guzmán & Horak
- Psilocybe neoxalapensis Guzmán, Ram.-Guill. & Halling
- Psilocybe ningshanensis X.L. He, W.Y. Huo, L.G. Zhang, Y. Liu & J.Z. Li
- Psilocybe niveotropicalis Ostuni, Rockefeller, J. Jacobs & Birkebak

=== O ===
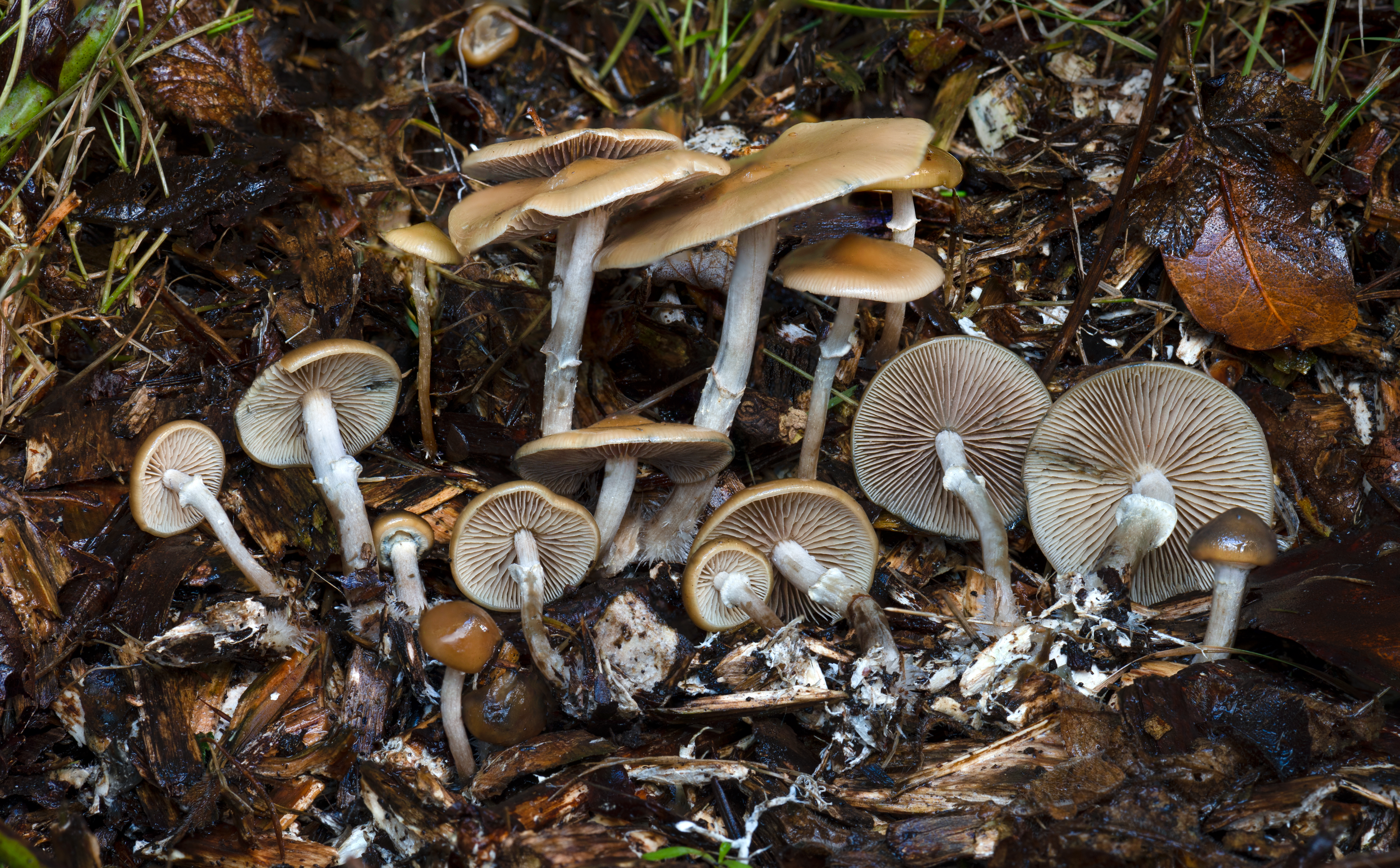
Psilocybe ovoideocystidiata

- Psilocybe ochraceocentrata
- Psilocybe ovoideocystidiata Guzmán et Gaines

=== P ===
- Psilocybe papuana Guzmán & Horak
- Psilocybe paulensis (Guzmán & Bononi) Guzmán (= Psilocybe banderiliensis var. paulensis Guzmán & Bononi)
- Psilocybe pelliculosa (A.H. Sm.) Singer & A.H. Sm.
- Psilocybe pintonii Guzmán
- Psilocybe pleurocystidiosa Guzmán
- Psilocybe plutonia (Berk. & M.A. Curtis) Sacc.
- Psilocybe portoricensis Guzmán, Tapia & Nieves-Rivera
- Psilocybe pseudoaztecorum Natarajan & Raman
- Psilocybe puberula Bas & Noordel.

=== Q ===
- Psilocybe quebecensis Ola'h & R. Heim

=== R ===
- Psilocybe rickii Guzmán & Cortez
- Psilocybe rostrata (Petch) Pegler
- Psilocybe rzedowskii Guzmán

=== S ===
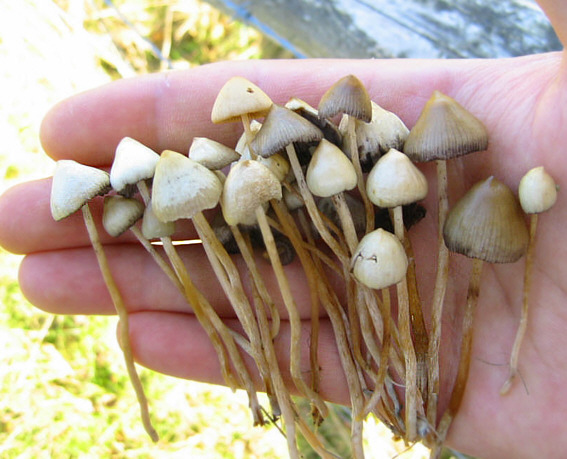
A handful of freshly picked Psilocybe semilanceata, sometimes referred to as Liberty Caps

- Psilocybe samuiensis Guzmán, Bandala & Allen
- Psilocybe schultesii Guzmán & S.H. Pollock
- Psilocybe semilanceata (Fr. : Secr.) P. Kumm.
- Psilocybe septentrionalis (Guzmán) Guzmán (= Psilocybe subaeriginascens Höhn. var. septentrionalis Guzmán)
- Psilocybe serbica Moser & Horak
- Psilocybe sierrae Singer (= Psilocybe subfimetaria Guzmán & A.H. Sm.)
- Psilocybe silvatica (Peck) Singer & A.H. Sm.
- Psilocybe singeri Guzmán
- Psilocybe strictipes Singer & A.H. Sm.
- Psilocybe stuntzii Guzman & Ott
- Psilocybe subacutipilea Guzmán, Saldarriaga, Pineda, García & Velázquez
- Psilocybe subaeruginascens Hohnel
- Psilocybe subaeruginosa Cleland
- Psilocybe subbrunneocystidiata P.S. Silva & Guzmán
- Psilocybe subcaerulipes Hongo
- Psilocybe subcubensis Guzmán
- Psilocybe subpsilocybioides Guzmán, Lodge & S.A. Cantrell
- Psilocybe subtropicalis Guzmán

=== T ===
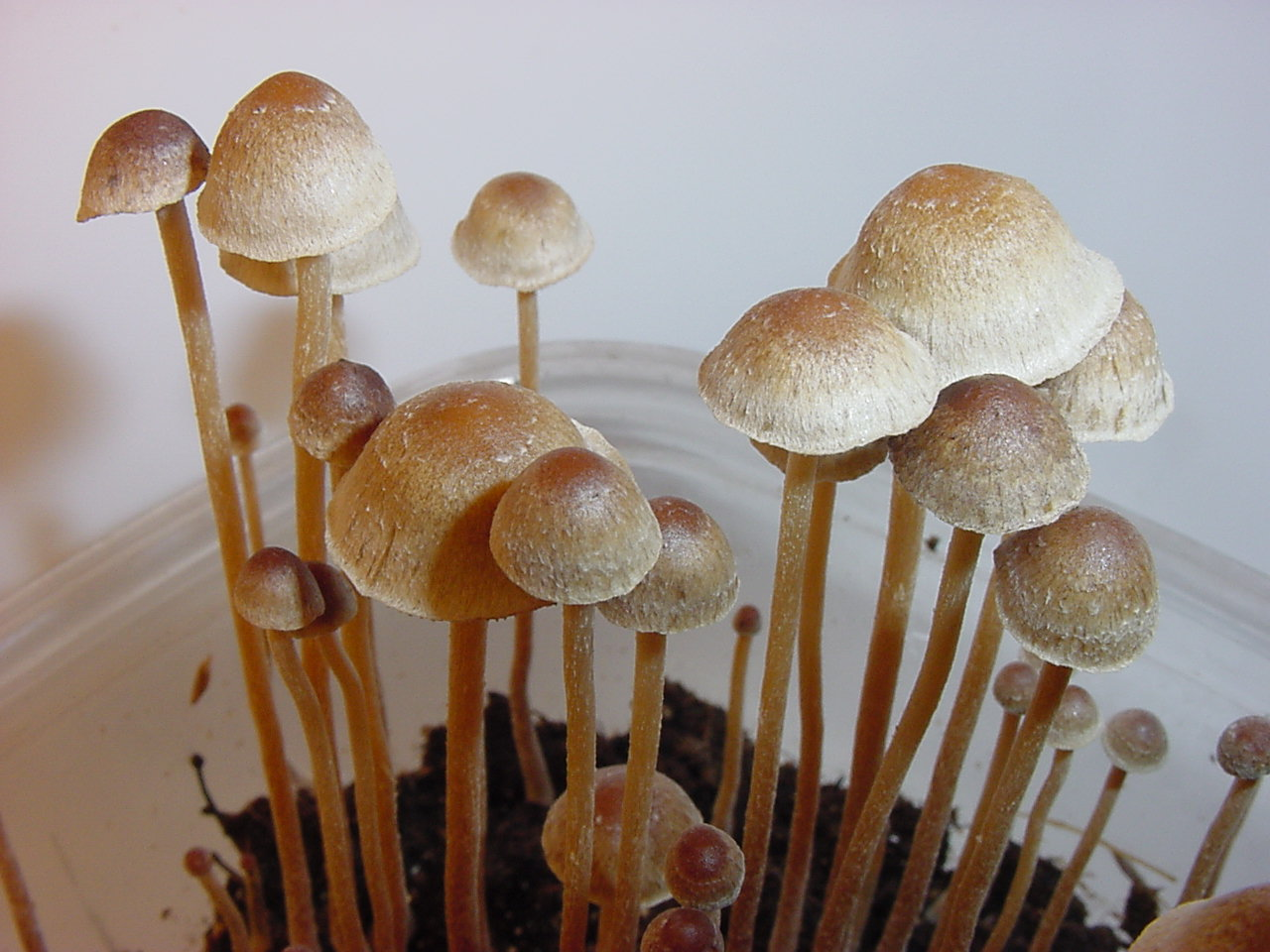
Psilocybe tampanensis

- Psilocybe tampanensis Guzmán & S.H. Pollock (photo)
- Psilocybe tasmaniana Guzmán & Watling (1978)
- Psilocybe thaiaerugineomaculans Guzmán, Karunarathna & Ram.-Guill.
- Psilocybe thaicordispora Guzmán, Ram.-Guill. & Karun.
- Psilocybe thaiduplicatocystidiata Guzmán, Karun. & Ram.-Guill.

=== U ===
- Psilocybe uruguayensis Singer ex Guzmán
- Psilocybe uxpanapensis Guzmán

=== V ===
- Psilocybe venenata (S. Imai) Imaz. & Hongo (= Psilocybe fasciata Hongo; Stropharia caerulescens S. Imai)

=== W ===
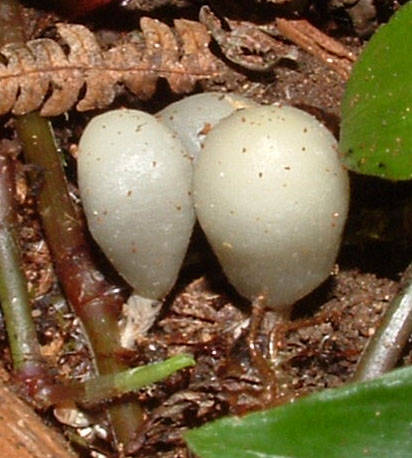
Psilocybe weraroa

- Psilocybe wassoniorum Guzmán & S.H. Pollock
- Psilocybe wayanadensis K.A. Thomas, Manim. & Guzmán
- Psilocybe weilii Guzmán, Tapia & Stamets (photo)
- Psilocybe weldenii Guzmán
- Psilocybe weraroa Borovicka, Oborník & Noordel.

=== X ===
- Psilocybe xalapensis Guzmán & A. López

=== Y ===
- Psilocybe yungensis Singer & A.H. Sm.

=== Z ===
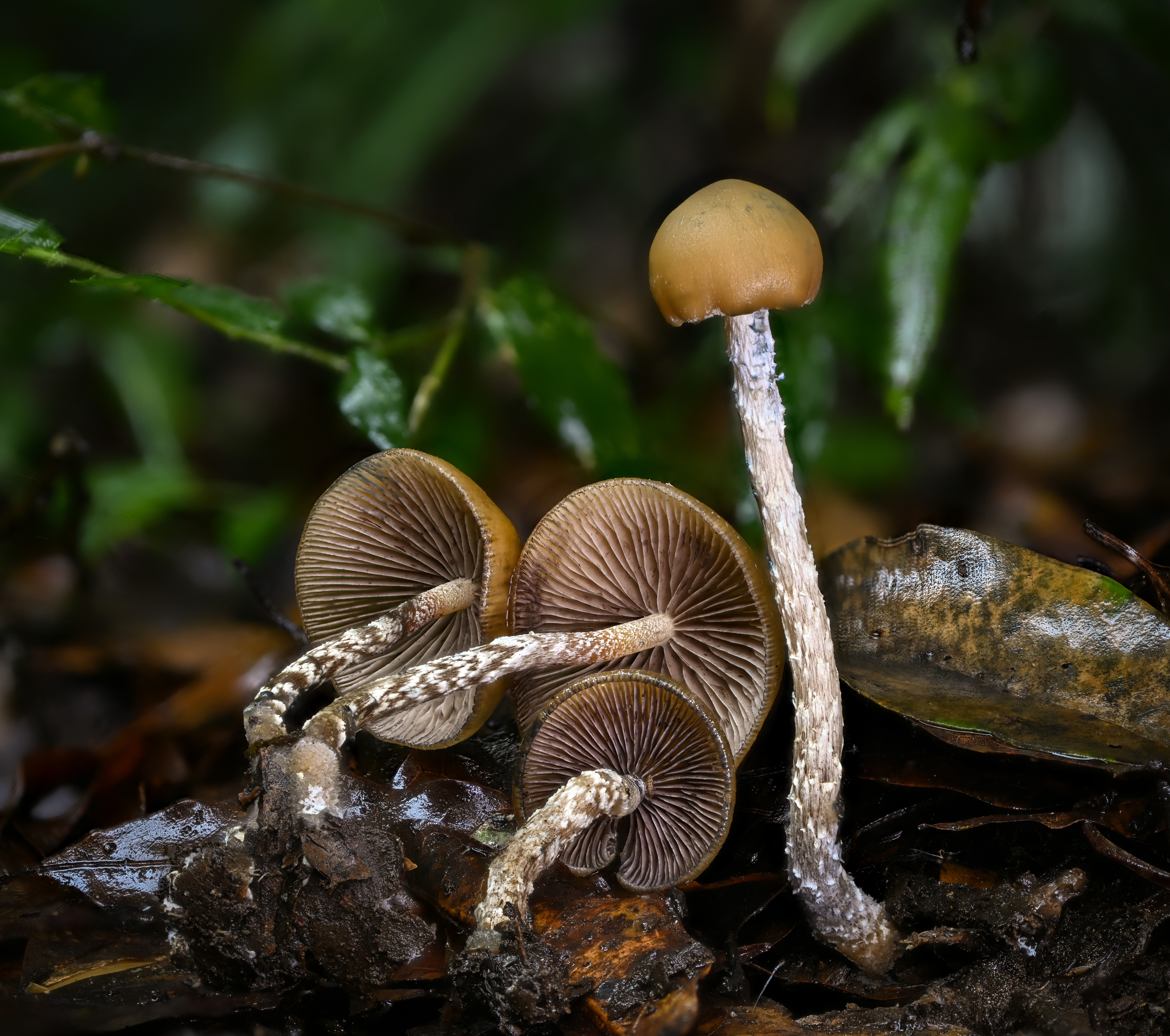
Psilocybe zapotecorum

- Psilocybe zapotecoantillarum Guzmán, T.J. Baroni & Lodge
- Psilocybe zapotecocaribaea Guzmán, Ram.-Guill. & T.J. Baroni
- Psilocybe zapotecorum
- Psilocybe zhushanensis R.L. Zhao & B. Cao
