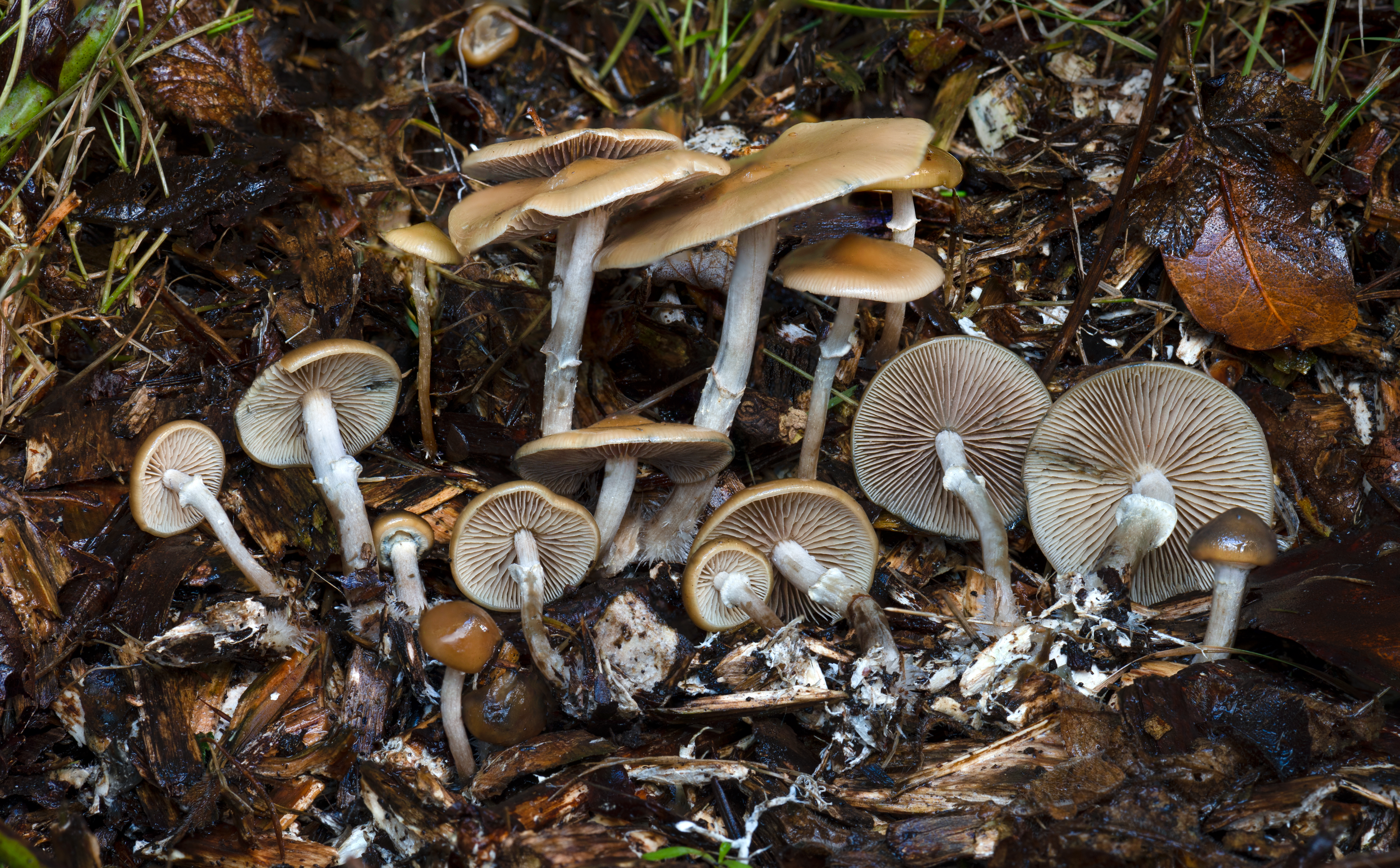

Scientific classification
- Kingdom: Fungi
- Division: Basidiomycota
- Class: Agaricomycetes
- Order: Agaricales
- Family: Hymenogastraceae
- Genus: Psilocybe
- Species: P. ovoideocystidiata

Binomial name
- Psilocybe ovoideocystidiata Guzmán & Gaines
Range of Psilocybe ovoideocystidiata in the contiguous U.S.

= Psilocybe ovoideocystidiata =

Species of fungus

Psilocybe ovoideocystidiata
- Mycological characteristics
- Gills on hymenium
- Cap is convex or umbonate
- Hymenium is adnate
- Stipe has a ring
- Spore print is blackish-brown to purple
- Ecology is saprotrophic
- Edibility is psychoactive

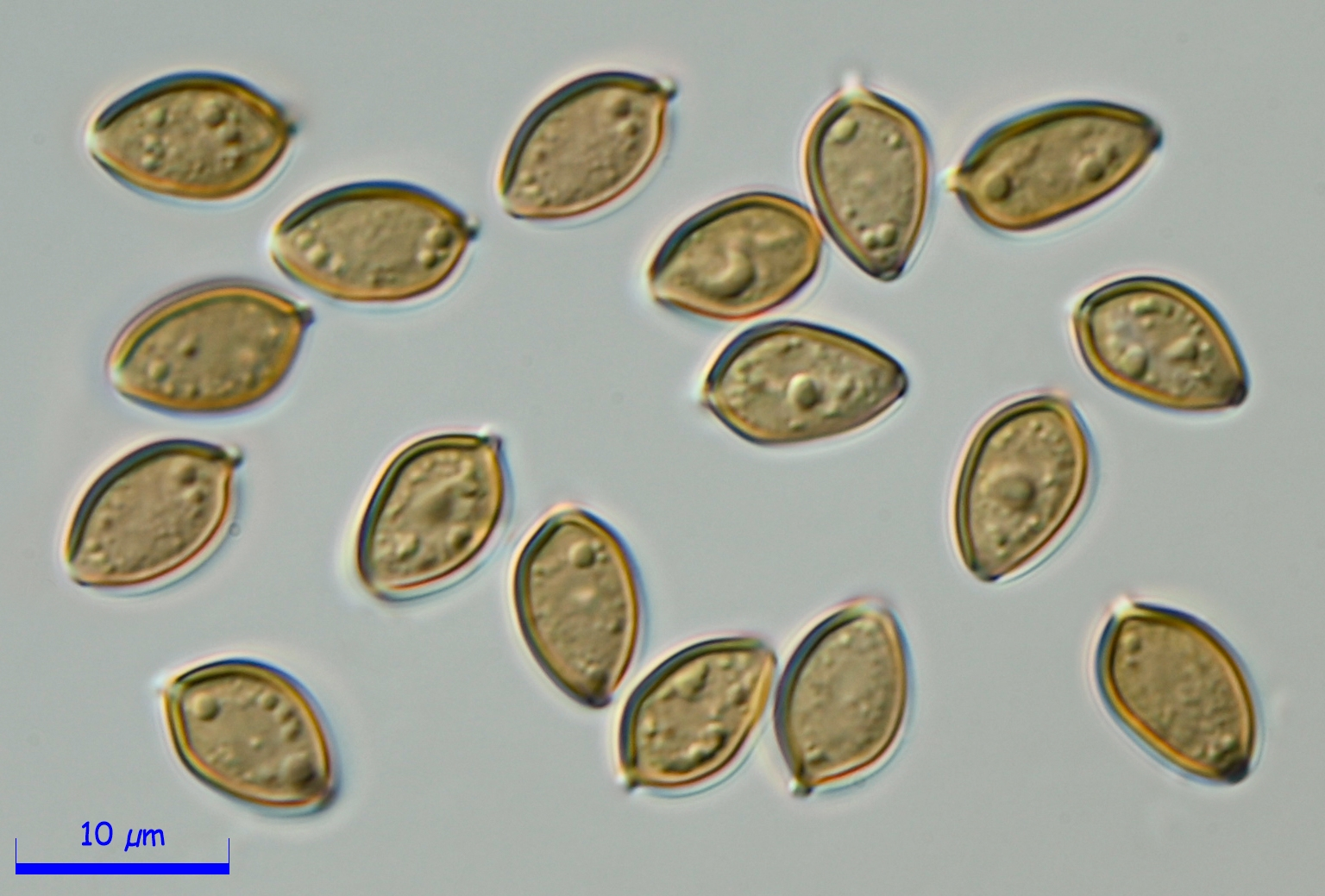
Psilocybe ovoideocystidiata spores

Psilocybe ovoideocystidiata, commonly known as ovoid, psychedelic ovoid mushroom, or river teacher is a psilocybin mushroom native to North America. It is closely related to P. subaeruginascens from Java, P. septentrionalis from Japan, and P. wayanadensis from India. This mushroom was first documented by Richard V. Gaines in Montgomery County, Pennsylvania in June 2003.

== Etymology ==
The specific epithet refers to the abundant ovoid pleurocystidia and cheilocystidia of this species.

== Description ==
- Cap: (1) 1.5 — 5 (8) cm across, convex to subumbonate, chestnut or orangish brown to yellowish brown to pearly cream color, hygrophanous, glabrous, sub-viscid, translucent-striate near the margin, from slightly to highly undulated in maturity. During youth, the cap is usually highly convex and dark brown/black (the stem is white). During maturity, the entire mushroom becomes light-brown (cinnamon-brown when moist and light-beige when dry). Mature specimens often naturally exhibit blue-greenish bruising, and old, dried-out specimens are usually all black. Appearance may vary significantly among individuals, depending on maturity and location. Flesh thick, pliant. Bruises blue and green where injured.
- Gills: adnate attachment and range from whitish to rusty brown, lavender, or dark purple brown.
- Spore print: Dark purple brown.
- Stipe: (1.5) 3 – 9 (13) cm long by (2) 3 – 15 (20) mm wide, equal, somewhat subbulbous, hollow, base sometimes hypogeous, smooth at the top and often having small hairs near the bottom, colored whitish with irregular yellowish, brownish, or bluish tones. The partial veil is variable, ranging from a thin cortina that leaves a barely perceptible annular zone, to a substantial membrane that leaves a fairly persistent annulus. If a veil remnant is present, it is often found near the middle of the stem (unlike many other Psilocybe species, where it is just under the cap).
- Taste: farinaceous
- Odor: farinaceous to spicy
- Microscopic features: Spores (7–) 8–9 (–12) × ( 5.5 – ) 6 – 7 (–8.5) μm, rhomboid to subrhomboid in face view, subellipsoid in side view, thick-walled, with the wall 0.8 to 1.5 μm thick. One end of the spore has a broad germ pore and the other side has a short hilar appendage. Two types of cheilocystidia and pleurocystidia are present. One type of pleurocystidia measures 16 - 24 x 6 - 8 and is venstricose-rostrate. The other type is larger, 20 - 40 micrometers by 12 - 16 micrometers, globose-pyriform, sometimes with a narrow apex and narrow base. The basidia are 4 spored and measure 20 – 28 × 7 – 9 μm.

== Similar species ==
Although P. ovoideocystidiata is sometimes confused with Psilocybe caerulipes, it can be distinguished by its rhomboid spores, larger stature, earlier fruiting season, and membranous annulus. The recently described Psilocybe caeruleorhiza differs from P. ovoideocystidiata in lacking an annulus and fruiting in the late Fall and early Winter, rather than in the Spring and early Summer. Both of these Psilocybe species are known only from eastern North America. Other similar Psilocybe species could be confused with P. ovoideocystidiata in its western North American range. It can also be mistaken for species belonging to other brown-spored agaric genera such as Agrocybe, but these will lack the blue bruising reaction characteristic of psilocybin mushrooms.

== Habitat and distribution ==
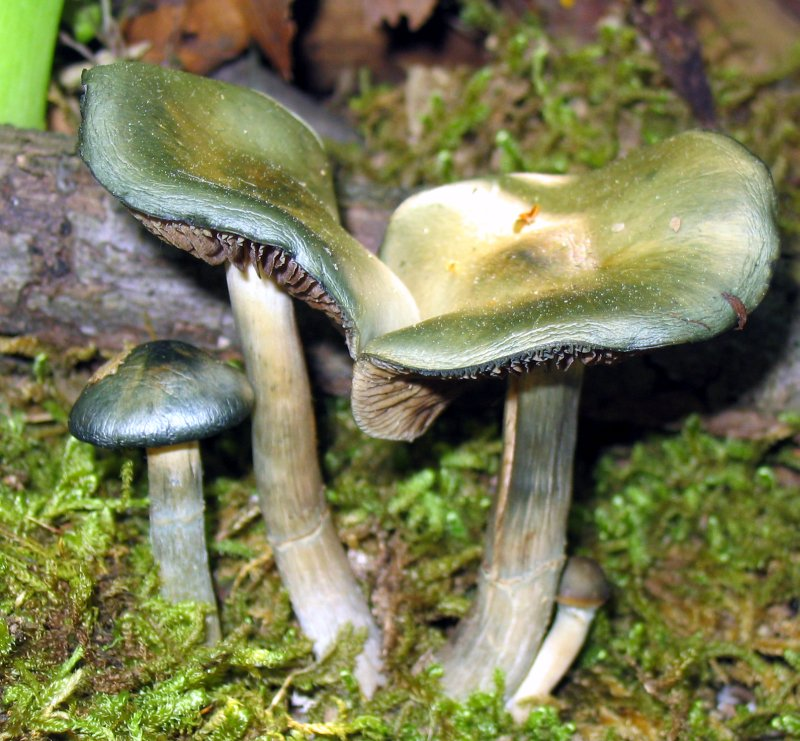
Wild Psilocybe ovoideocystidiata

Psilocybe ovoideocystidiata is mainly native to the Eastern United States, where its range stretches from Missouri east to Rhode Island and from Georgia north to Michigan. It is particularly common in the Ohio River valley. It also occurs in Western North America from Southern California north to British Columbia, Canada. As a relatively recently identified species, P. ovoideocystidiata is frequently reported to appear in new areas, leading some to speculate that its range is currently undergoing expansion.

This species grows on woody debris and can be found along rivers and streams, usually in overflow areas, and in man-made mulch and wood chips in urban and suburban environments. It is sometimes found alongside Japanese knotweed and also tends to prefer shady areas and avoid direct sunlight. It is typically gregarious, growing in groups of several hundred individuals in one particular area, as well as in multiple small clusters of several mushrooms each, within close proximity of one another. Solitary specimens also occur on occasion.

Seasonality varies a great deal depending on what region they are found in, but in the northeastern US, they are most common in the spring, from mid-April to late-June (peaking late-May), especially after periods of steady heavy rain for several consecutive days (a common weather pattern in the eastern US during spring). However, they may occasionally fruit, as late as November. These mushrooms seem to be very sensitive to the season and fruit chiefly in the spring; very little fruiting occurs during other times of the year, even during favorable weather conditions.

== See also ==
- List of Psilocybin mushrooms
