= Psilocybe subacutipilea =

Scientific classification
- Domain: Eukaryota
- Kingdom: Fungi
- Division: Basidiomycota
- Class: Agaricomycetes
- Order: Agaricales
- Family: Hymenogastraceae
- Genus: Psilocybe
- Species: P. subacutipilea

Binomial name
- Psilocybe subacutipilea Guzmán, Saldarr., Pineda, G.García & L.-F.Velázquez (1994)

Species of fungus

Psilocybe subacutipilea is a species of mushroom in the family Hymenogastraceae. Described as new to science in 1994, the species is found in Colombia. Based on its blue staining reaction to touch, the mushroom is presumed to contain the psychoactive compound psilocybin. P. subacutipilea is classified in the section Mexicana of the genus Psilocybe. It is similar to the Brazilian species P. acutipilea.

== See also ==
- List of psilocybin mushrooms
- Psilocybin mushrooms
