= Russula pyriodora =

Scientific classification
- Domain: Eukaryota
- Kingdom: Fungi
- Division: Basidiomycota
- Class: Agaricomycetes
- Order: Russulales
- Family: Russulaceae
- Genus: Russula
- Species: R. pyriodora

Binomial name
- Russula pyriodora Ruots. (2011)

Species of mushroom-forming fungus

Russula pyriodora is a rare species of mushroom-forming fungus in the family Russulaceae, formally described in 2011. The mushroom features a pink to rosy cap, whitish gills, and has a distinctive pear-like odour which inspired its name (from Latin pyri- meaning pear). It has been found only in specific brook-ravine sites in eastern Finland with limestone-influenced soils. The species forms mycorrhizal relationships primarily with birch trees and produces fruit bodies in late summer.

== Taxonomy ==
The species was formally described by Juhani Ruotsalainen and Seppo Huhtinen in the journal Karstenia in 2011. The specific epithet pyriodora derives from the Latin for "pear‑scented", alluding to the fruit‑body's distinctive aroma. The holotype (JR.8415F) was collected on 21 August 2011 in the Kylmänpuro Nature Protection Area, Paltamo (Kainuu province), on nutrient‑rich, limestone‑influenced brook ravine soil.

== Description ==
Fruit bodies of the fungus are small to medium‑sized. The cap (pileus) measures 1.8–5.5 cm in diameter, initially convex and silky‑glossy, pale pink to rosy, later flattening and becoming matt with age and dryness, often showing paler patches and a small, darker umbo; the margin is smooth in young specimens and becomes distinctly sulcate (grooved) at maturity. The gills (lamellae) are straight and easily separable from the stipe, greyish white when fresh and turning yellowish white on drying; they are moderately spaced when young but become more distant in older mushrooms. The stipe is 4–6 cm long and 0.6–1.8 cm thick, cylindrical to slightly club shaped (clavate), often widening in the middle or at the top, greyish white with variable red‑tinged hues, and tapering towards the base in older specimens.

The flesh of R. pyriodora is thin, fragile and spongy in the stipe. Its taste is oily and sweetish with a faint sharpness at the gill edge, while the odour is pear‑like, comparable to that of Inocybe corydalina. The spore print is almost white. Microscopically, spores typically measure 9.0 by 7.6 μm on average, broadly ellipsoid to obovate‑ellipsoid, ornamented with rounded warts or short crests up to 1.0 μm high; the plage is small and partly amyloid. Basidia (spore-bearing cells) are clavate, four‑spored, 34–36 by 10–12 μm. Cheilocystidia are abundant, fusiform with a long tapering apex (about 85 by 8.5–10 μm). The cap cuticle bears numerous dermatocystidia (6–8 μm wide) in small clusters or scattered among narrow hyphae.

== Habitat and distribution ==
At the time of its original publication, R. pyriodora was known only from two brook‑ravine sites in eastern Finland: Kylmänpuro Nature Protection Area (Paltamo, Kainuu) and Loutteispuro Nature Protection Area (Nilsiä, North Savo). Both localities feature nutrient‑rich, limestone‑influenced soils within wet, wooded mires and brookside mosaics of tussock grasses and herbaceous vegetation. Common trees at these sites include species of Betula, Alnus, Salix and Picea, with birch most likely serving as the main mycorrhizal partner. Fruiting bodies appear in late summer. Considered a rare species, the mushroom has usually been recorded in calcareous soil.

== See also ==
- List of Russula species
