= Psilocybe congolensis =

Scientific classification
- Domain: Eukaryota
- Kingdom: Fungi
- Division: Basidiomycota
- Class: Agaricomycetes
- Order: Agaricales
- Family: Hymenogastraceae
- Genus: Psilocybe
- Species: P. congolensis

Binomial name
- Psilocybe congolensis Guzmán, S.C.Nixon & Cortés-Pérez (2013)

Species of fungus

Psilocybe congolensis is a species of mushroom-forming fungus in the family Hymenogastraceae. It is the only psilocybin mushroom known from the Congo, Africa. It was described as new to science in 2013.

Genetically it is close to Psilocybe samuiensis, in Psilocybe sect. Mexicanae.

== See also ==
- List of Psilocybin mushrooms
