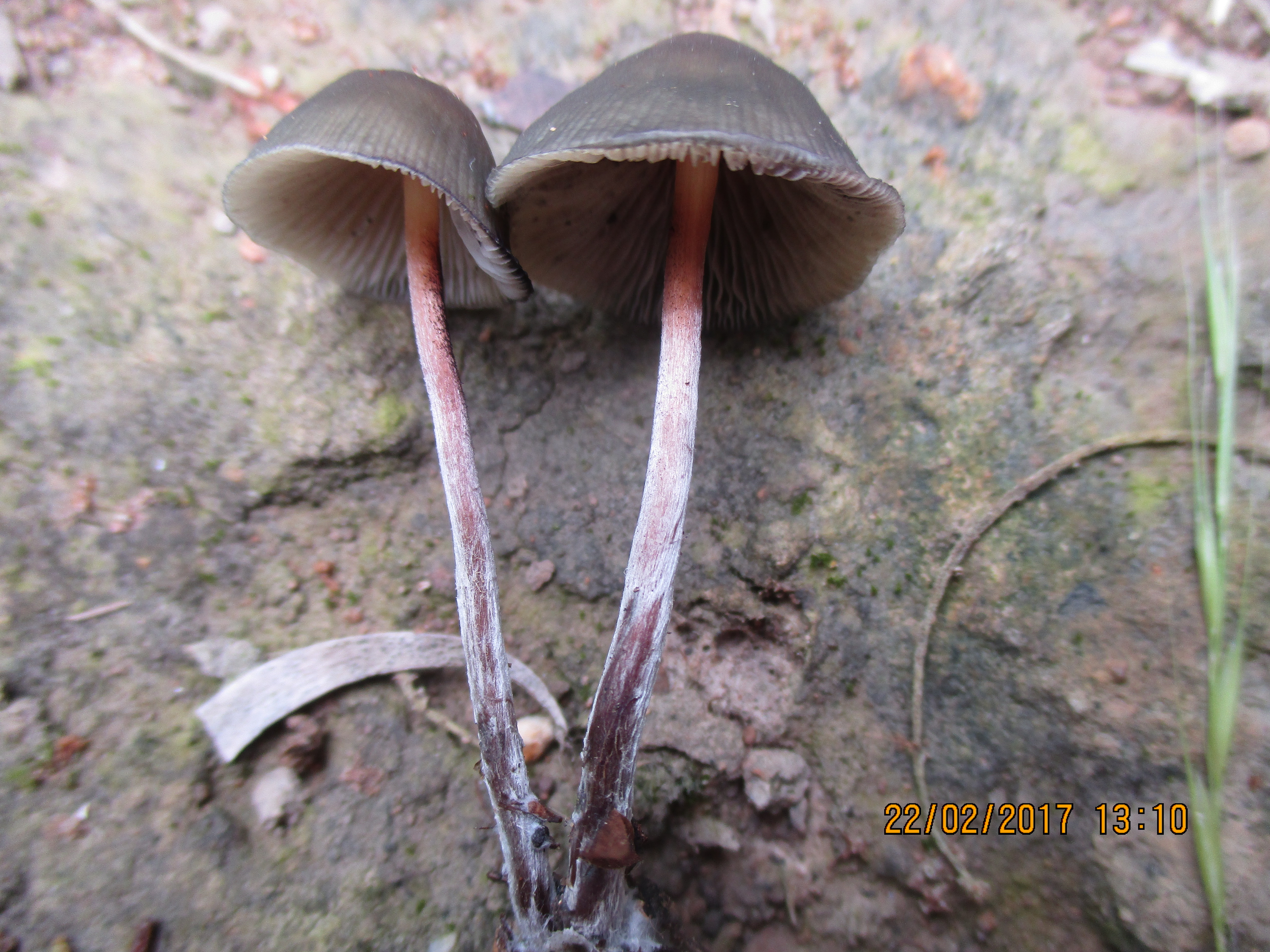

Scientific classification
- Kingdom: Fungi
- Division: Basidiomycota
- Class: Agaricomycetes
- Order: Agaricales
- Family: Hymenogastraceae
- Genus: Psilocybe
- Species: P. papuana

Binomial name
- Psilocybe papuana Guzmán & E. Horak

= Psilocybe papuana =

Species of fungus

Psilocybe papuana is a species of mushroom in the family Hymenogastraceae.

It was described in 1978 from Papua New Guinea. It is most frequently seen in New South Wales, Australia.

== See also ==
- List of Psilocybin mushrooms
- Psilocybin mushrooms
- Psilocybe
