= Psilocybe fuliginosa =

Scientific classification
- Domain: Eukaryota
- Kingdom: Fungi
- Division: Basidiomycota
- Class: Agaricomycetes
- Order: Agaricales
- Family: Hymenogastraceae
- Genus: Psilocybe
- Species: P. fuliginosa

Binomial name
- Psilocybe fuliginosa (Murrill) A.H. Sm. (1948)

Synonyms
- Atylospora fuliginosa Murrill (1918); Psathyra fuliginosa (Murrill) Murrill (1918)

Species of fungus

Psilocybe fuliginosa is a species of mushroom in the family Hymenogastraceae.

== See also ==
- List of Psilocybin mushrooms
- Psilocybin mushrooms
- Psilocybe
