= Psilocybe natarajanii =

Scientific classification
- Domain: Eukaryota
- Kingdom: Fungi
- Division: Basidiomycota
- Class: Agaricomycetes
- Order: Agaricales
- Family: Hymenogastraceae
- Genus: Psilocybe
- Species: P. natarajanii

Binomial name
- Psilocybe natarajanii Guzmán

Species of fungus

Psilocybe natarajanii is a species of mushroom in the family Hymenogastraceae. The mushroom contains the medicinal compound psilocybin.

It was described from the state of Tamil Nadu in India.

== See also ==
- List of Psilocybin mushrooms
- Psilocybin mushrooms
- Psilocybe
