= Panaeolus moellerianus =

Scientific classification
- Domain: Eukaryota
- Kingdom: Fungi
- Division: Basidiomycota
- Class: Agaricomycetes
- Order: Agaricales
- Family: Bolbitiaceae
- Genus: Panaeolus
- Species: P. moellerianus

Binomial name
- Panaeolus moellerianus Singer

Species of fungus

Panaeolus moellerianus is a species of mushroom in the Bolbitiaceae family.

== See also ==
- List of Psilocybin mushrooms
- Psilocybin mushrooms
- Psilocybe
