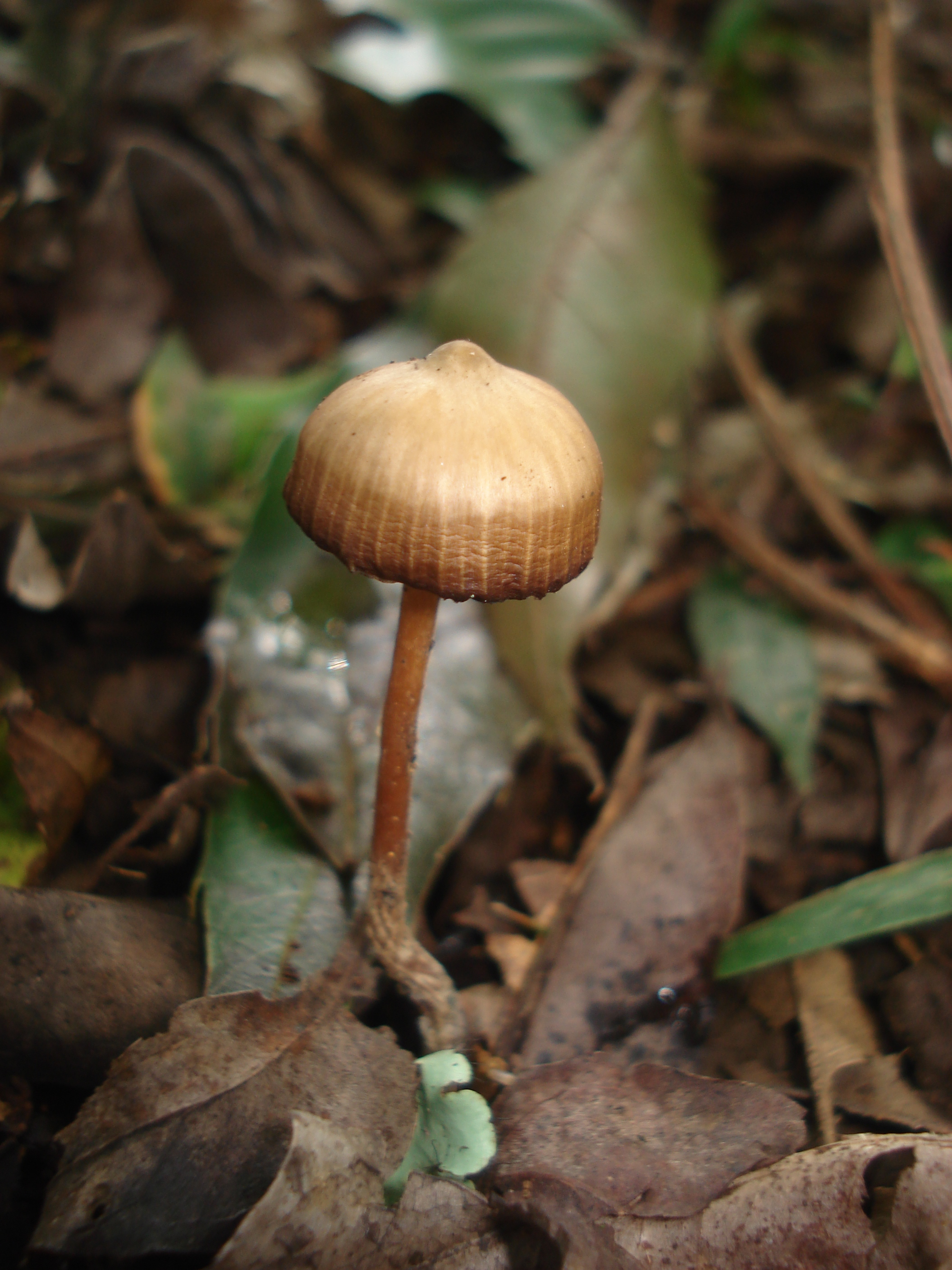
- In Coatepec, Veracruz, Mexico

Scientific classification
- Domain: Eukaryota
- Kingdom: Fungi
- Division: Basidiomycota
- Class: Agaricomycetes
- Order: Agaricales
- Family: Hymenogastraceae
- Genus: Psilocybe
- Species: P. subtropicalis

Binomial name
- Psilocybe subtropicalis Guzmán (1995)

Synonyms
- Psilocybe bipleurocystidiata E. Horak and Guzman (2009)

= Psilocybe subtropicalis =

Species of fungus

Psilocybe subtropicalis is a species of mushroom in the family Hymenogastraceae. The mushroom contains the psychoactive compound psilocybin. Found in Mexico, it was described as new to science by mycologist and Psilocybe authority Gastón Guzmán in 1995.

== See also ==
- List of Psilocybin mushrooms
- Psilocybin mushrooms
- Psilocybe
