= Psilocybe puberula =

Scientific classification
- Kingdom: Fungi
- Division: Basidiomycota
- Class: Agaricomycetes
- Order: Agaricales
- Family: Hymenogastraceae
- Genus: Psilocybe
- Species: P. puberula

Binomial name
- Psilocybe puberula Bas & Noordel.

Species of fungus

Psilocybe puberula is a species of mushroom in the family Hymenogastraceae. It contains the hallucinogenic drugs psilocybin and psilocin. It was described in 1996 in Amersfoort, Leusderheide, Netherlands, and is also known from Belgium. It is very rare.

== See also ==
- List of Psilocybin mushrooms
- Psilocybin mushrooms
- Psilocybe
