= Psilocybe aquamarina =

Scientific classification
- Kingdom: Fungi
- Division: Basidiomycota
- Class: Agaricomycetes
- Order: Agaricales
- Family: Hymenogastraceae
- Genus: Psilocybe
- Species: P. aquamarina

Binomial name
- Psilocybe aquamarina (Pegler) Guzmán (1995)

Synonyms
- Stropharia aquamarina Pegler (1977)

Species of fungus

Psilocybe aquamarina is a species of mushroom-forming fungus in the family Hymenogastraceae. First described as a species of Stropharia by David Pegler in 1977, it was transferred to the genus Psilocybe by Gastón Guzmán in 1995.

== See also ==
- List of psilocybin mushrooms
- Psilocybin mushrooms
