= Psilocybe jacobsii =

Scientific classification
- Domain: Eukaryota
- Kingdom: Fungi
- Division: Basidiomycota
- Class: Agaricomycetes
- Order: Agaricales
- Family: Hymenogastraceae
- Genus: Psilocybe
- Species: P. jacobsii

Binomial name
- Psilocybe jacobsii Guzmán

Species of fungus

Psilocybe jacobsii is a species of mushroom in the family Hymenogastraceae, collected and recorded by James Q. Jacobs near Huatla de Jimenez in the Mazatec region of Oaxaca state, Mexico. Dr. Gastón Guzmán studied the microscopic features and published the new species in the world monograph, The Genus Psilocybe. The mushroom may contain the psychoactive compounds found in the genus Psilocybe, including psilocybin.

== Selected publications ==
- Guzmán, G. The Genus Psilocybe: A Systematic Revision of the Known Species Including the History, Distribution and Chemistry of the Hallucinogenic Species. Beihefte zur Nova Hedwigia Heft 74. J. Cramer, Vaduz, Germany (1983)

== See also ==
- List of Psilocybin mushrooms
- Psilocybin mushrooms
- Psilocybe
