= Psilocybe guatapensis =

Scientific classification
- Domain: Eukaryota
- Kingdom: Fungi
- Division: Basidiomycota
- Class: Agaricomycetes
- Order: Agaricales
- Family: Hymenogastraceae
- Genus: Psilocybe
- Species: P. guatapensis

Binomial name
- Psilocybe guatapensis Guzmán, Saldarriaga, Pineda, G. García & L.-F. Velázquez

Species of fungus

Psilocybe guatapensis is a species of mushroom in the family Hymenogastraceae. It is very small and is known only from Colombia.

== See also ==
- List of Psilocybin mushrooms
- Psilocybin mushrooms
- Psilocybe
