= Psilocybe caeruleorhiza =

Scientific classification
- Domain: Eukaryota
- Kingdom: Fungi
- Division: Basidiomycota
- Class: Agaricomycetes
- Order: Agaricales
- Family: Hymenogastraceae
- Genus: Psilocybe
- Species: P. caeruleorhiza

Binomial name
- Psilocybe caeruleorhiza Canan, Ostuni, Rockefeller & Birkebak

Species of fungus

Psilocybe caeruleorhiza Mycological characteristics
- Gills on hymenium
- Cap is convex or umbonate
- Hymenium is adnate or sinuate
- Spore print is purple-brown
- Ecology is saprotrophic
- Edibility is psychoactive

Psilocybe caeruleorhiza, commonly known as the winter teacher is a psilocybin mushroom native to North America. It is a member related of Psilocybe section Aztecorum and a close relative of the European Psilocybe serbica and North American Psilocybe aztecorum. This species was first documented from Iowa in November 2021 by iNaturalist user "runmex".

== Etymology ==
The specific epithet derives from the Latin caeruleo, meaning blue, and the Greek rhiza, meaning root. This refers to the strong bluing reaction present in rhizomorphs of this species on solid agar media in tissue culture.

== Similar species ==
Psilocybe ovoideocystidiata can be confused with P. caeruleorhiza, but differs in possessing a thin annulus at maturity and by fruiting in the Spring and early Summer rather than in the late Fall and early Winter. It can also be mistaken for species belonging to other brown-spored agaric genera such as Agrocybe, but these will lack the blue bruising reaction characteristic of psilocybin mushrooms.

== Habitat and distribution ==
Psilocybe caeruleorhiza is native to the Eastern United States and has been found in Indiana, Iowa, Kentucky, Michigan, Missouri, and Pennsylvania and grows primarily in man-made mulch beds. It fruits in cold weather from late Fall to early Winter, specifically October to January, with its season peaking in December.

== See also ==
- List of Psilocybin mushrooms
