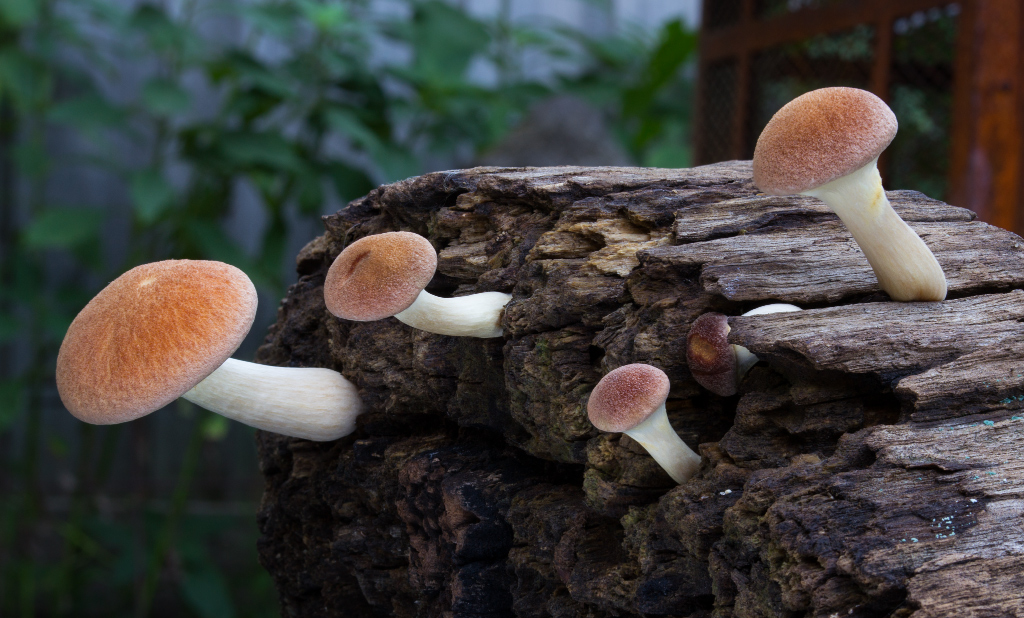

Scientific classification
- Domain: Eukaryota
- Kingdom: Fungi
- Division: Basidiomycota
- Class: Agaricomycetes
- Order: Agaricales
- Family: Hymenogastraceae
- Genus: Gymnopilus
- Species: G. purpuratus

Binomial name
- Gymnopilus purpuratus (Cooke & Massee) Singer (1955)

Synonyms
- Agaricus purpuratus Cooke & Massee (1890)

= Gymnopilus purpuratus =

Species of agaric fungus in the family Hymenogastraceae

Gymnopilus purpuratus is a species of agaric fungus in the family Hymenogastraceae. It grows in clusters on dead wood, tree stumps and wood chip mulch. It is widely distributed and has been recorded in Argentina, Australia, Chile, New Zealand, the UK and Germany. It has a broadly convex cap covered in small dry reddish-brown scales, a stout yellow stem beneath reddish brown, wine-red to purple vertical fibres, and a thick rusty orange spore print.

The fruitbodies can stain greenish, blue and purple when damaged, and the species is psychoactive. A chemical analysis carried out by Jochen Gartz in 1993 found that this species contains 0.34% psilocybin, 0.29% psilocin and 0.05% baeocystin.

== Description ==
Gymnopilus purpuratus Mycological characteristics
- Gills on hymenium
- Cap is convex or umbonate
- Hymenium is adnate or adnexed
- Stipe is bare
- Spore print is yellow-orange
- Ecology is saprotrophic
- Edibility is psychoactive

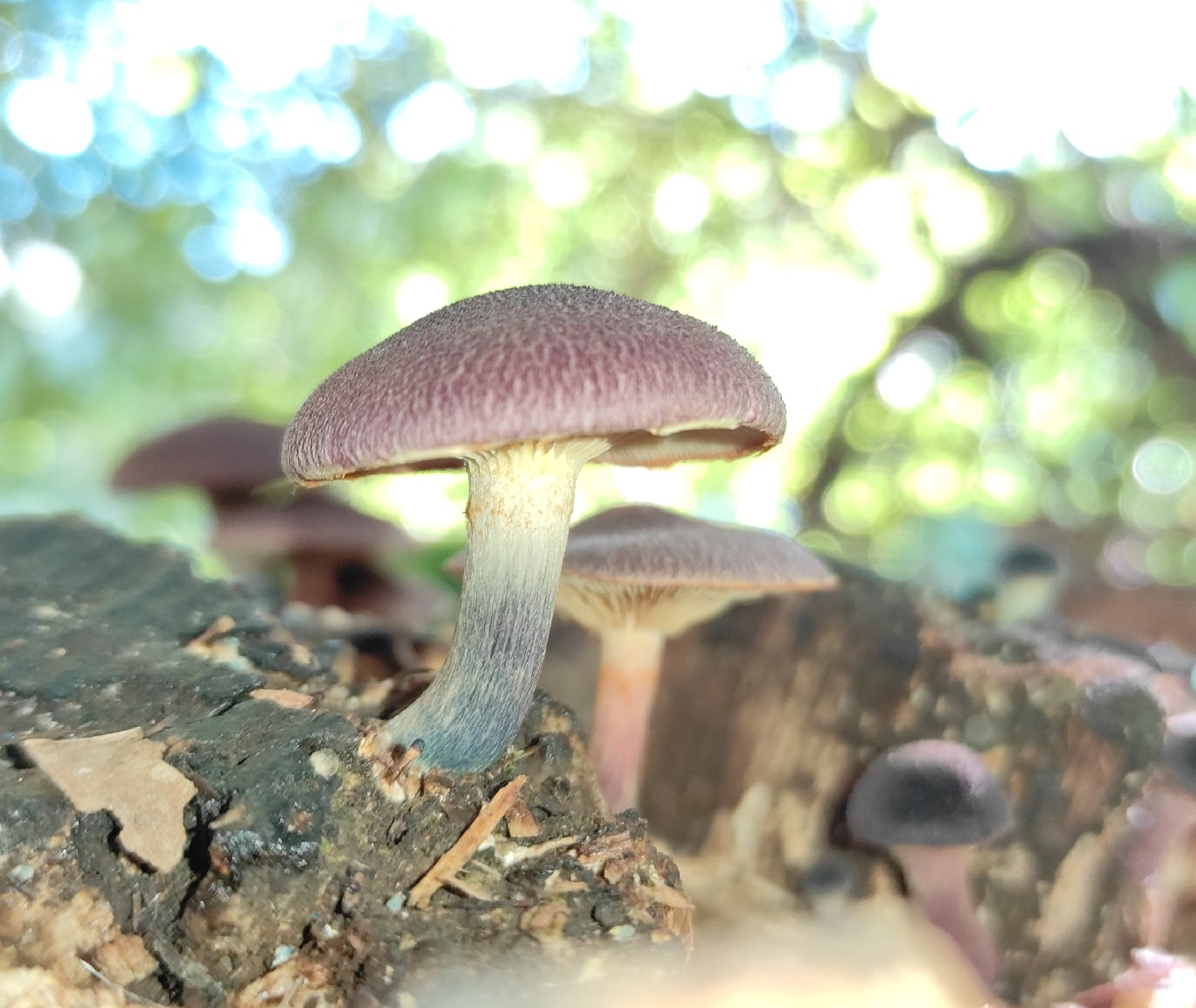
Convex dry scaly cap and colourful fibrous stipe

The cap ranges from 1.5 to 6 cm across, is convex to obtuse, and is reddish brown with a dry scaly surface which is sometimes cracked in age. The stem is brown-red and covered by fibers and has blue-green spots where the stem is damaged. The gills are crowded, yellow to orange, and adnexed. The stem is dusted with rusty orange spores and has a cottony scanty partial veil.

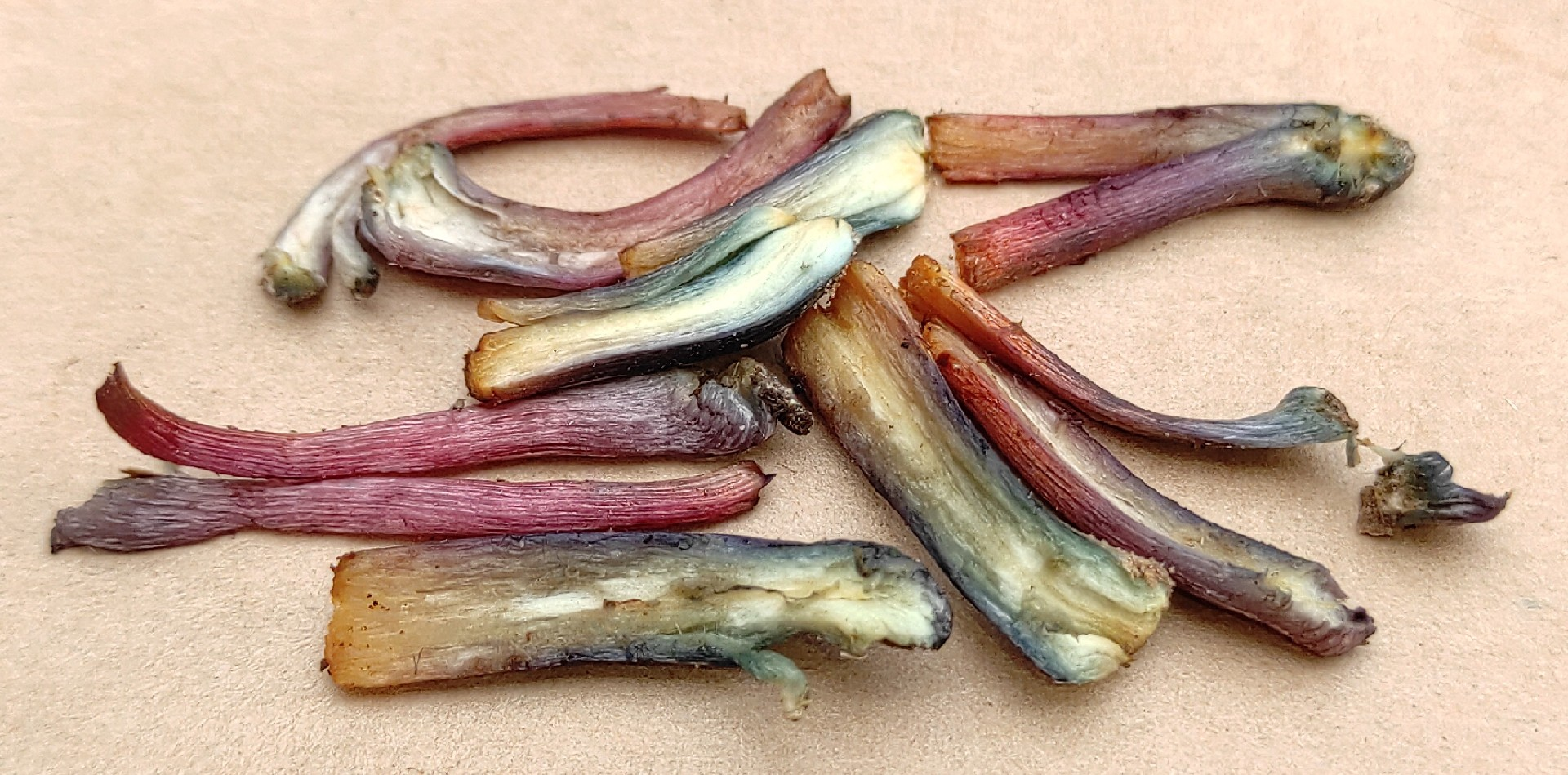
Stems with a bluing reaction after being cut

== See also ==
- List of Gymnopilus species
- List of psilocybin mushrooms
