= Panaeolus venezolanus =

Scientific classification
- Domain: Eukaryota
- Kingdom: Fungi
- Division: Basidiomycota
- Class: Agaricomycetes
- Order: Agaricales
- Family: Bolbitiaceae
- Genus: Panaeolus
- Species: P. venezolanus

Binomial name
- Panaeolus venezolanus Guzmán

Species of fungus

Panaeolus venezolanus is a species of mushroom in the Bolbitiaceae family. This species of mushroom has a cap with a diameter of 20–35 mm and has a brownish gray to ashy gray color.

== See also ==
- List of Psilocybin mushrooms
- Psilocybin mushrooms
- Psilocybe
