= Psilocybe rickii =

Scientific classification
- Domain: Eukaryota
- Kingdom: Fungi
- Division: Basidiomycota
- Class: Agaricomycetes
- Order: Agaricales
- Family: Hymenogastraceae
- Genus: Psilocybe
- Species: P. rickii

Binomial name
- Psilocybe rickii Guzmán & Cortez

Species of fungus

Psilocybe rickii is a species of mushroom in the family Hymenogastraceae.

== See also ==
- List of Psilocybin mushrooms
- Psilocybin mushrooms
- Psilocybe
