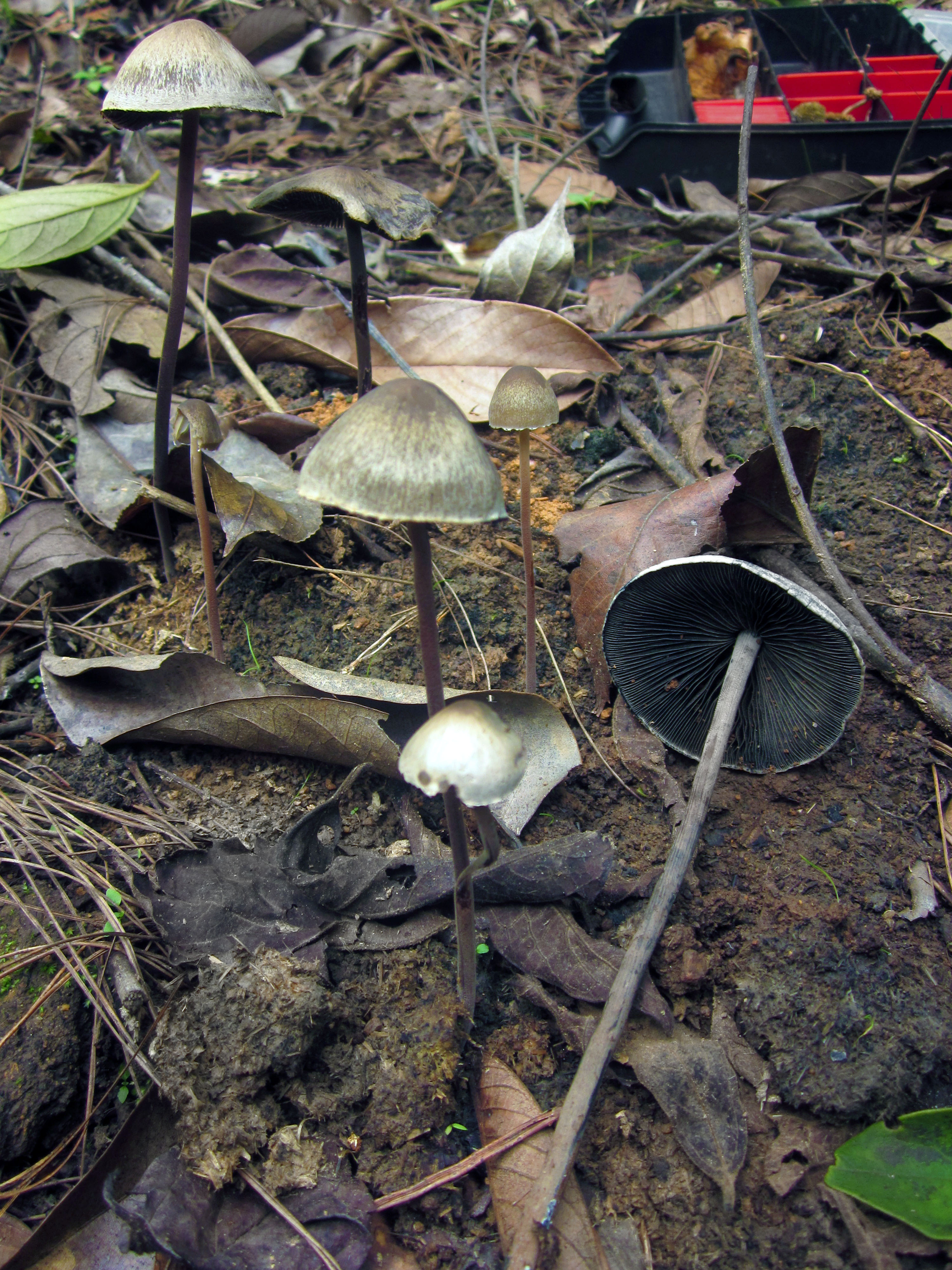

Scientific classification
- Domain: Eukaryota
- Kingdom: Fungi
- Division: Basidiomycota
- Class: Agaricomycetes
- Order: Agaricales
- Family: Bolbitiaceae
- Genus: Panaeolus
- Species: P. rubricaulis

Binomial name
- Panaeolus rubricaulis Petch

= Panaeolus rubricaulis =

Species of fungus

Panaeolus rubricaulis is a species of mushroom in the Bolbitiaceae family.

== See also ==
- List of Psilocybin mushrooms
- Psilocybin mushrooms
- Psilocybe
