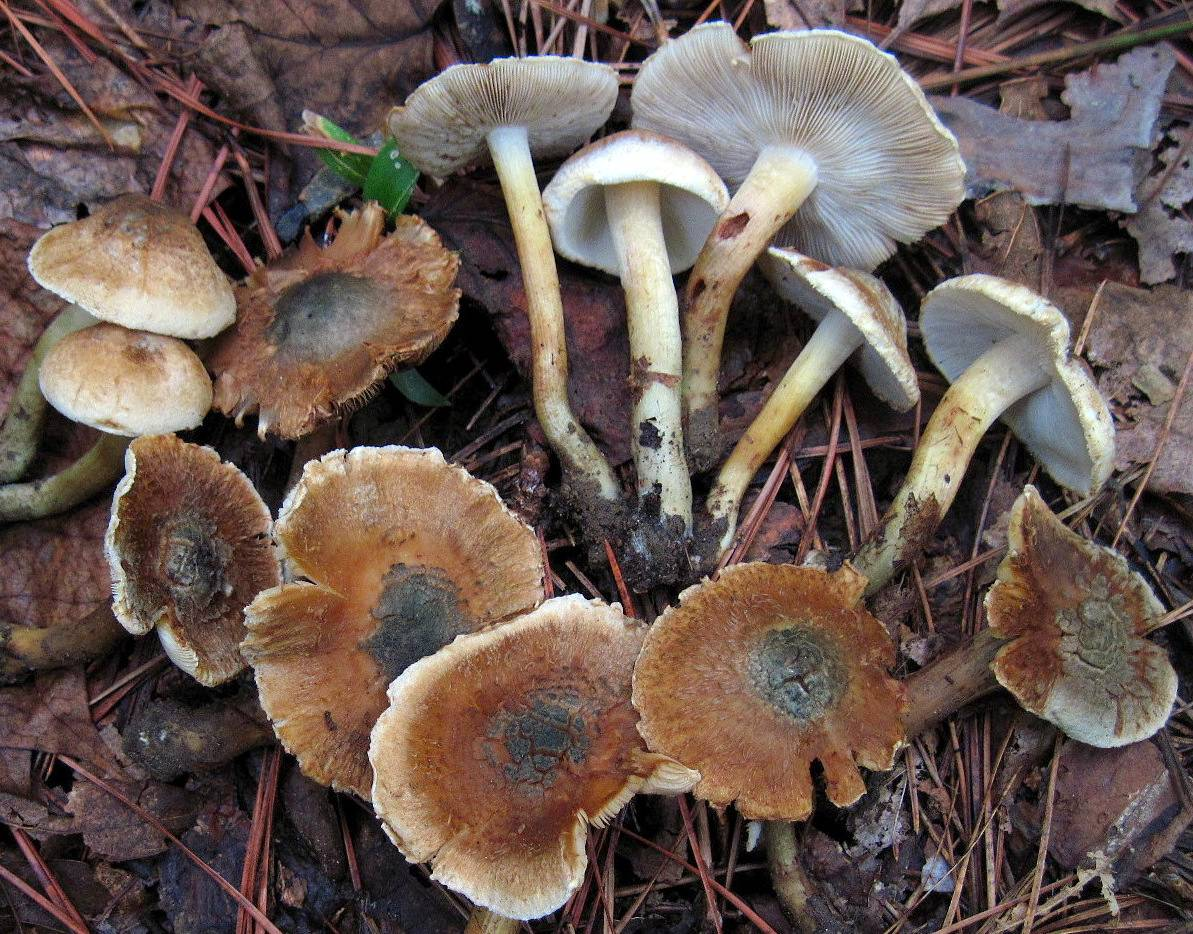
- Inocybe corydalina var. corydalina

Scientific classification
- Kingdom: Fungi
- Division: Basidiomycota
- Class: Agaricomycetes
- Order: Agaricales
- Family: Inocybaceae
- Genus: Inocybe
- Species: I. corydalina
- Variety: I. c. var. corydalina

Trinomial name
- Inocybe corydalina var. corydalina Quélet (1872)

= Inocybe corydalina var. corydalina =

Inocybe corydalina var. corydalina
- Mycological characteristics
- Gills on hymenium
- Cap is conical or convex
- Hymenium is adnate
- Stipe is bare
- Spore print is brown
- Ecology is mycorrhizal
- Edibility is psychoactive

Inocybe corydalina var. corydalina, commonly known as the greenflush fibrecap, is a member of the genus Inocybe which is widely distributed in temperate forests. It is a small mycorrhizal mushroom which contains a small amount of the hallucinogen psilocybin.

== Description ==
- Cap: 3.5–5 cm diameter, buff to brown, often with greenish tones, conic to convex or plane in age, with or without an umbo, with appressed fibrillose squamules on the cap which are more frequent towards the center, and an incurved margin. The center of the cap is darker brown to greenish, sometimes black and the flesh is white.
- Gills: adnate and very numerous, pale cream brown to grayish buff.
- Spores: Smooth and lemon shaped, measuring 8 x 5.5 micrometres, dull brown, often with a bluish-grayish stem base.
- Stipe: 2.5–10 cm long, 4 to 6 mm thick, and is equal width for the whole length, sometimes with some swelling at the base. The upper part of the stem is smooth and the lower part is fibrillose. Has a cortinate partial veil which soon disappears.
- Taste:
- Odor: Aromatic.
- Microscopic features: Pleurocystidia 33-70 by 9-21 micrometers, clavate cylindrical. Cheilocystidia are not common and look like pleurocystidia.

== Distribution and habitat ==
Inocybe corydalina var. corydalina is widespread across Europe and the British Isles. It usually fruits in the fall under deciduous trees but can also be found under conifers.

== Edibility ==
Gurevich and Nezoiminogo reported that this mushroom contains the mycotoxin muscarine but no psilocybin; other researchers have been unable to confirm this result. Chemical analysis by Stijve and Kuyper shows that it contains 0.032% psilocybin, a very low concentration.

== See also ==
- List of Inocybe species
- List of Psilocybin mushrooms
