= Psilocybe indica =

Scientific classification
- Domain: Eukaryota
- Kingdom: Fungi
- Division: Basidiomycota
- Class: Agaricomycetes
- Order: Agaricales
- Family: Hymenogastraceae
- Genus: Psilocybe
- Species: P. indica

Binomial name
- Psilocybe indica Sathe & J.T. Daniel

Species of fungus

Psilocybe indica is a species of mushroom in the family Hymenogastraceae. The mushroom contains psilocybin, a prodrug for the psychedelic tryptamine psilocin.

It was described from the state of Kerala in India.

== See also ==
- List of Psilocybin mushrooms
- Psilocybin mushrooms
- Psilocybe
