= Psilocybe subaeruginascens =

Scientific classification
- Kingdom: Fungi
- Division: Basidiomycota
- Class: Agaricomycetes
- Order: Agaricales
- Family: Hymenogastraceae
- Genus: Psilocybe
- Species: P. subaeruginascens

Binomial name
- Psilocybe subaeruginascens Hohnel

Species of fungus

Psilocybe subaeruginascens Mycological characteristics
- Gills on hymenium
- Cap is campanulate or conical
- Hymenium is adnate
- Stipe has a ring
- Spore print is blackish-brown
- Ecology is saprotrophic
- Edibility is psychoactive

Psilocybe subaeruginascens is a psychedelic mushroom which has psilocybin and psilocin as main active compounds. This mushroom is closely related to Psilocybe ovoideocystidiata.

== Description ==
The cap is 20–30 mm, and conical, to broadly campanulate (bell-shaped) or umbonate. It has a striated, ivory or pale-gray/brown colour, with a blue-green tinge and is hygrophanous. It does not change colour in reaction to KOH.

The tough white stipe measures 40-65 x 2–3 mm. It is smooth to finely hairy though its base has conspicuous white rhizoids and mycelial strands attached to substrate. It has a fragile, fleeting, white ring left by its partial veil. It bruises blue-green where damaged. The flesh is tough, white, blues when touched and its odor is unpleasant.

The gills are a pale brown, to yellowish brown color when young, becoming dark brown with white fringed edges in age. They have an adnate attachment, are crowded and somewhat forked. Its spore print is dark brown or black.

=== Microscopic Features ===
The spores measure 8-9.5x 5-6.5 x 4.5-5.5 μm, and are elliptical to subrhomboid in face view and almond-shaped in side view. They have thick-walls (1-1.3 μm in diameter), with distinct germ pore at its apex, and are smooth and opaque. The basidia are 24-30 x 6-8 μm in size, and are cylindrical. They have 4 spores each, and have sterigmata that are up to 7 μm long.

The cheilocystidia measure 18-24 x 6-10 μm, and are spindle to urn-shaped, with a rounded or slightly swollen apex. The apex is sometimes covered in a thin, transparent crust. The spores have thin-walls, and are transparent. Pleurocystidia and caulocystidia absent. Clamp connections are present.

The hyphae of the pileipellis run in parallel to the cap surface, and are transparent, to pale yellow. They are 4-10 μm in diameter and are non-gelatinized, and non-incrusted, with no distinct terminal cells. The subpellis is made up of transparent, irregularly interwoven, thin-walled hyphae. The stipitipellis has parallel, transparent to yellowish brown, thin-walled hyphae that are 5–7 μm wide.

== Distribution and habitat ==
Psilocybe subaeruginascens grows in gregariously and in cespitose clusters in wood chips, piles of leaves, and woody debris in urban areas and along trails and roads in deciduous forests and gardens. It is occasionally found in dung. It is found from April to July in southern Japan and subtropical Indonesia .

== Use ==
A study in 1981 found that the mycelium of P. subaeruginascens has a psilocybin concentration of .017-.018%. In his book Psilocybin Mushrooms of the World: An Identification Guide, Paul Stamets describes the mushrooms as moderately potent. Possession of this mushroom is banned in Japan.

It can oxidize naphthalene.

== See also ==
- List of Psilocybin mushrooms
