= Psilocybe liniformans var. americana =

Scientific classification
- Kingdom: Fungi
- Division: Basidiomycota
- Class: Agaricomycetes
- Order: Agaricales
- Family: Hymenogastraceae
- Genus: Psilocybe
- Species: P. liniformans
- Variety: P. l. var. americana

Trinomial name
- Psilocybe liniformans var. americana Guzmán & Stamets

Psilocybe liniformans var. americana
- Mycological characteristics
- Gills on hymenium
- Cap is convex
- Hymenium is adnexed
- Stipe is bare
- Spore print is purple-brown
- Ecology is saprotrophic
- Edibility is psychoactive

Psilocybe liniformans var. americana, is a psilocybin mushroom in the family Hymenogastraceae. It is in the section Semilanceatae of Psilocybe and has psilocybin as its main active compound.

== Description ==
- The cap is 1 — 2.5 cm convex to nearly plane, and is sometimes broadly umbonate but not papillate. It is smooth, dull grayish brown to slightly olivaceus, more reddish at the center, hygrophanous, and becoming straw brown when dry with the center remaining more brownish. It sometimes has a bluish green tone, or olivacous tones at the margin when young.
- The gills are adnexed, subdistant, broad, and dark chocolate brown to purplish brown with age.
- The spores are dark purple brown, ellipsoid, and 13 — 14.5 by 7.5 — 8.8(10)μm.
- The stipe is 1.4 — 3.0 cm by 1 – 2 mm, equal, enlarging at the base. It is whitish to very pale brownish, darker below, bruising blue, and finely fibrillose in the lower portion. The partial veil is thin and soon disappears.
- The taste is weak to somewhat farinaceous; The odor is strongly aromatic to farinaceous.
- Microscopic features: The basidia are 4-spored and pleurocystidia are absent. The cheilocystidia are 22 — 33 by 5.5 — 9 μm, lageniform and have an extended neck.

== Habitat and formation ==
Psilocybe liniformans var. americana is found scattered to gregarious in rich pastures or grasslands, fruiting from summer to early winter. It has been collected in Washington, Oregon, and Michigan, and has also been reported from Chile where it fruits in the spring. This mushroom is very close to the type variety; the main difference is the lack of a gelatinous layer on the edge of the lamellae and the terricolous habitat.

== See also ==
- List of Psilocybin mushrooms
