= Psilocybe samuiensis =

Scientific classification
- Kingdom: Fungi
- Division: Basidiomycota
- Class: Agaricomycetes
- Order: Agaricales
- Family: Hymenogastraceae
- Genus: Psilocybe
- Species: P. samuiensis

Binomial name
- Psilocybe samuiensis Guzmán, Bandala & J.W.Allen (1993)

Species of fungus

Psilocybe samuiensis
- Mycological characteristics
- Gills on hymenium
- Cap is conical or umbonate
- Hymenium is adnate
- Stipe is bare
- Spore print is purple-brown
- Ecology is saprotrophic
- Edibility is psychoactive

Psilocybe samuiensis is a species of psychedelic mushroom in the family Hymenogastraceae, which has psilocybin and psilocin as its main active compounds. It was placed in the section Mexicanae of genus Psilocybe by Gastón Guzmán due to its rhomboid-shaped spores. It has been found in Koh Samui, a small tropical island in Thailand, where some psychoactive species are consumed by both natives and tourists. Chao Samui rarely consume psilocybian fungi. Such local use is usually restricted to local females who do so at the request of foreigners.

== Description ==
The cap is typically 7–15 mm in diameter, almost convex to conic in shape, umbonate with a small papilla. The cap is viscid and has a separable pellicle. It is a reddish-brown color when moist, but becomes lighter brown when dry. The stipe is 4.0–6.5 cm high × 1.5 cm thick, equal or slightly bulbous. The stipe is hollow, whitish in color, and covered with white fibrils. It is the same color as the cap, and stains blue when bruised. The odor and taste are slightly like grain meal (farinaceous). Spores have been recorded in the range of 10.4-12.8 by 6.4-8 μm and have a thick wall with a flattened, broad germ pore.

== Habitat ==
Psilocybe samuiensis was first picked in soil containing mixtures of sand and clay west of the village of Ban Hua Thanon, in Koh Samui. Since then it is now known to occur in Ranong Province in Thailand and also at Angkor Wat in Siem Riap, Kampuchea; and verified by Gaston Guzman. It grows scattered to gregarious in rice paddies, but never directly on manure, fruiting from early July to late August. Gastón Guzmán mistakenly noted that the species was known only by the native children who collect psychoactive fungi for sale. Only three local children observed John W. Allen harvesting fresh specimens of the species, yet days later could not remember said species.

More recently a number of collections of agarics with very similar macroscopic features to the holotype of this species have been collected in Australia, with ITS region sequences suggesting synonymy with samuiensis.

== Chemistry ==
Analysed by HPLC and TLC, psilocybin and psilocin in the fruit bodies ranged from 0.023–0.90% (dry weight) and 0.05–0.81%, respectively. baeocystin was also detected at the concentration of 0.01–0.05%.

== See also ==
- List of Psilocybin mushrooms
