= Psilocybe acutipilea =

Scientific classification
- Kingdom: Fungi
- Division: Basidiomycota
- Class: Agaricomycetes
- Order: Agaricales
- Family: Hymenogastraceae
- Genus: Psilocybe
- Species: P. acutipilea

Binomial name
- Psilocybe acutipilea (Speg.) Guzmán (1978)

Synonyms
- Deconica acutipilea Speg. (1889)

Species of fungus

Psilocybe acutipilea is a species of mushroom-forming fungus in the family Hymenogastraceae. It was discovered in October 1881 in Apiahy, Sao Paulo State, Brazil by Carlos Spegazzini, and described by him as a new species of Deconica in 1889. Gastón Guzmán transferred it to Psilocybe in 1978, but Ramirez-Cruz considered it a possible synonym of Psilocybe mexicana, but the type specimen was too moldy for them to be certain.

== See also ==
- List of Psilocybin mushrooms
- Psilocybin mushrooms
