= Psilocybe wayanadensis =

Scientific classification
- Domain: Eukaryota
- Kingdom: Fungi
- Division: Basidiomycota
- Class: Agaricomycetes
- Order: Agaricales
- Family: Hymenogastraceae
- Genus: Psilocybe
- Species: P. wayanadensis

Binomial name
- Psilocybe wayanadensis K.A. Thomas, Manim. & Guzmán

Species of mushroom

Psilocybe wayanadensis is a species of mushroom in the family Hymenogastraceae. The mushroom contains psilocybin, a prodrug for the psychedelic tryptamine psilocin.

It was described from the state of Kerala in India.

== See also ==
- List of Psilocybin mushrooms
- Psilocybin mushrooms
- Psilocybe
- Original species description
