= Psilocybe carbonaria =

Scientific classification
- Domain: Eukaryota
- Kingdom: Fungi
- Division: Basidiomycota
- Class: Agaricomycetes
- Order: Agaricales
- Family: Hymenogastraceae
- Genus: Psilocybe
- Species: P. carbonaria

Binomial name
- Psilocybe carbonaria Singer

Species of fungus

Psilocybe carbonaria is a species of mushroom in the family Hymenogastraceae.

== See also ==
- List of Psilocybe species
- Psilocybin mushroom
- Psilocybe
