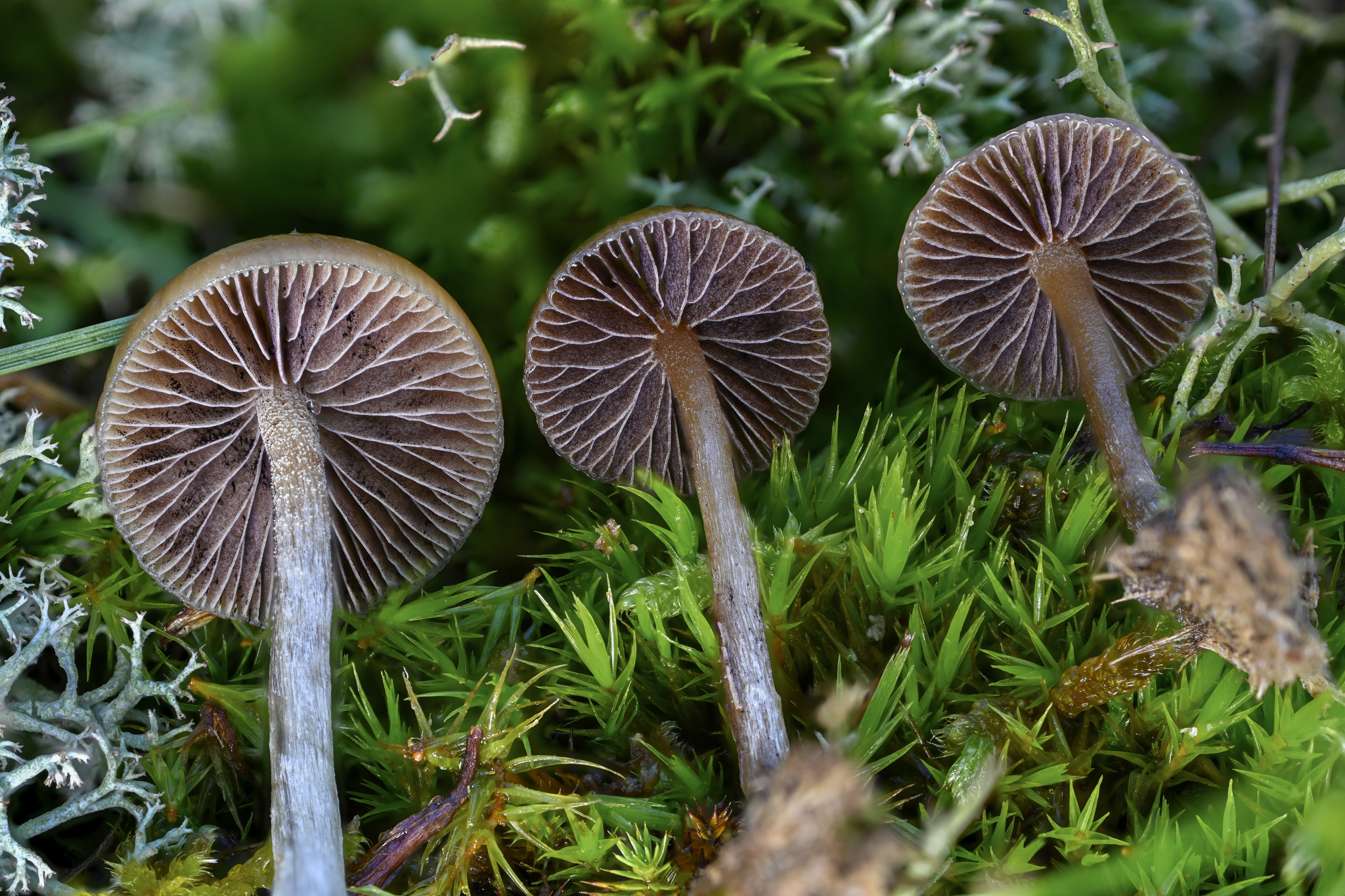

Scientific classification
- Kingdom: Fungi
- Division: Basidiomycota
- Class: Agaricomycetes
- Order: Agaricales
- Family: Hymenogastraceae
- Genus: Psilocybe
- Species: P. liniformans

Binomial name
- Psilocybe liniformans Guzmán & Bas

Varieties
- Psilocybe liniformans var. americana; Psilocybe liniformans var. liniformans

= Psilocybe liniformans =

Species of fungus

Psilocybe liniformans Mycological characteristics
- Gills on hymenium
- Ecology is saprotrophic

Psilocybe liniformans is a mushroom in the family Hymenogastraceae. It is in the section Semilanceatae of Psilocybe.

== Description ==
The stipe of Psilocybe liniformans is 5.5-7.5 cm long. The cap is 4.5-7.5 cm wide. The latter is initially pointed bell-shaped and flattens with age. The red-brown, glossy cap fades to the edge of yellow-brownish. The lamellae are yellowish brown to dark yellowish brown. The spore print is brown to dark brown. The cylindrical and full-length grooved stipe is pale yellow. In the upper third of the stipe carries a whitish ring. The stipe and cap may colour blue when damaged.

== Similar species ==
Psilocybe liniformans is phylogenetically a close relative of Psilocybe fimetaria. Not only do they often grow in the same habitat, but they are macroscopically similar. The best way to differentiate the species by testing for the presence of separable gelatinous threads running along the bottom of the gills. This feature indicates Psilocybe liniformans.

== Habitat and distribution ==
Psilocybe liniformans has been found growing in the Netherlands, England and some other nearby European countries. It grows exclusively from herbivore dung, usually that of horses, and often fruits gregariously.
