= Psilocybe columbiana =

Scientific classification
- Domain: Eukaryota
- Kingdom: Fungi
- Division: Basidiomycota
- Class: Agaricomycetes
- Order: Agaricales
- Family: Hymenogastraceae
- Genus: Psilocybe
- Species: P. columbiana

Binomial name
- Psilocybe columbiana Guzmán (1978)

Species of fungus

Psilocybe columbiana is a species of mushroom in the family Hymenogastraceae known only from the páramos of high mountains in Colombia. It is in the Psilocybe fagicola complex with Psilocybe fagicola, Psilocybe oaxacana, Psilocybe banderillensis, Psilocybe herrerae, Psilocybe keralensis, Psilocybe neoxalapensis, and Psilocybe teofiloi.

== See also ==
- List of Psilocybin mushrooms
- Psilocybin mushrooms
- Psilocybe
