= Bolbitius callistus =

Scientific classification
- Kingdom: Fungi
- Division: Basidiomycota
- Class: Agaricomycetes
- Order: Agaricales
- Family: Bolbitiaceae
- Genus: Bolbitius
- Species: B. callistus

Binomial name
- Bolbitius callistus (Peck) Watling

Genus of fungi

Bolbitius callistus is a species of fungus. It belongs to the phylum Basidiomycota and was first described by Charles Horton Peck (1833-1917). It was given its modern name by Roy Watling in 1977. Bolbitius callistus belongs to the genus Bolbitius, and the family Bolbitiaceae.

== Similar species ==
It can resemble Gliophorus psittacinus.
