= Steven Hayden Pollock =

American physician and mycologist (1947–1981)

- Born: August 12, 1947; Los Angeles, California
- Died: February 1, 1981 (aged 33); San Antonio, TX
- Cause of death: Murder
- Resting place: Mission Burial Park North, San Antonio, Texas; 29.635249°N 98.610142°W
- Education: Medical College of Wisconsin, University of Texas Department of Pharmacology
- Partner: Mitzi Moore
- Father: Walter Pollock
- Scientific career
- Fields: Mycology
- Workplaces: Herbal Medicine Research Foundation, San Antonio, TX, and a Winnebago laboratory
- Academic advisors: Gastón Guzmán; Paul Stamets

Steven Hayden Pollock (August 12, 1947 – February 1, 1981) was an American mycologist who studied psychoactive mushrooms and published many articles on the potential of mushrooms to treat illness and improve quality of life. He was shot dead in his office and the murder remains unprosecuted.

== Life and career ==
On September 3, 1977, in Tampa, Florida, while the Second International Mycological Congress was ongoing, Pollock and Gary Lincoff discovered a new species of psychoactive mushroom, which they named Psilocybe tampanensis.

Pollock wrote a book on Magic Mushroom Cultivation in 1977. It contained his research on several ways to cultivate magic mushrooms, including the method of cultivation in brown rice that was later demonstrated to produce mushrooms of high psilocybin content.

Pollock isolated a strain of P. tampanensis that produced sclerotia of a size much bigger than known before. This discovery enabled a means of using psilocybin in places where magic mushrooms are illegal.

Pollock envisioned creating the first legal medical mushroom research laboratory and estimated he would need about two million dollars to set it up. Together with another mushroom lover, Michael Forbes, he founded a company called Hidden Creek in 1979 to sell P. tampanensis sclerotium by mail. The company advertised in the monthly magazine High Times, and became the largest magic mushroom vendor in the world within the same year.

As well as selling mushrooms and prescriptions, Pollock planted an acre of cannabis to get the funds he needed for his research. He traveled to the Amazon and Mexico to study psychoactive mushrooms and discovered three species in 1979: Psilocybe armandii, Psilocybe wassoniorum, and Psilocybe schultesii. In 1980, because of his high volume of illegal prescription writing, the state pharmacy board alerted employees about his practice. As a work-around Pollock bought his own pharmacy to supply his customers.

== Death ==
On the evening of January 31, 1981, Pollock worked late at his pharmaceutical practice. He spoke to his girlfriend Mitzi over the phone at seven, and told her that he could not meet her for dinner as he was expecting a patient. At half past nine, he received a phone call from fellow mycologist Paul Stamets, but Pollock cut the call short, claiming that some patients had arrived. Mitzi called several more times through the night, but Pollock did not answer. Worried, she went to his office at eleven. The place had been ransacked and Pollock was lying dead in a corner, having been shot in the head.

The police found 1,753 jars of growing psychoactive mushrooms in Pollock's greenhouse. These were dumped and burned by the San Antonio Narcotics Force.

In 1983, detective Anton Michalec gathered evidence against three men whom he suspected of the murder: Ernest Dietzmann and Jerry Baker, who were drug dependents and patients of Pollock's, and Arthur Lenz, a methamphetamine dealer. An informant told Michalec that these men had plotted to rob Pollock of his money, and their fingerprints matched those found at the crime scene. According to the police report, Michalec brought the case to the district attorney Terry McDonald, who refused to prosecute for unknown reasons. In 2013, journalist Hamilton Morris contacted McDonald, who said that the police report was mistaken, and that he had not been the district attorney at that time. Morris tried to discover who had actually been responsible for the refusal to prosecute, but was informed by the Drug Enforcement Administration that any records which might have contained this information had been destroyed.

== See also ==
- List of mycologists
