= Psilocybe herrerae =

Scientific classification
- Domain: Eukaryota
- Kingdom: Fungi
- Division: Basidiomycota
- Class: Agaricomycetes
- Order: Agaricales
- Family: Hymenogastraceae
- Genus: Psilocybe
- Species: P. herrerae

Binomial name
- Psilocybe herrerae Guzmán (1978)

Species of fungus

Psilocybe herrerae is a species of psilocybin mushroom in the family Hymenogastraceae. The mushroom was first described by Mexican mycologist Gastón Guzmán. It contains the compounds psilocybin and psilocin. Psilocybe herrerae is known only from the states of Chiapas and Veracruz, Mexico. It is in the Psilocybe fagicola complex with Psilocybe fagicola, Psilocybe oaxacana, Psilocybe banderillensis, Psilocybe columbiana, Psilocybe keralensis, Psilocybe neoxalapensis, and Psilocybe teofiloi.

== See also ==
- List of psilocybin mushrooms
- List of Psilocybe species
