= List of Pholiotina species =

This is a list of species in the genus Pholiotina. Since earlier circumscriptions of the genus Pholiotina were found to polyphyletic, many former species were moved to other genera. As of February 2024, the following species are accepted in the genus Pholiotina:

- Pholiotina alba (Enderle) Hauskn. & Enderle (2007)
- Pholiotina altoindina Singer (1989)
- Pholiotina arnoldsii Hauskn. (2007)
- Pholiotina atrocyanea Esteve-Rav., Hauskn. & Rejos (2007)
- Pholiotina blattaria (Fr.) Fayod (1889)
- Pholiotina calongei Siquier, E. Suárez, Salom & Planas (2022)
- Pholiotina caricicola Singer (1989)
- Pholiotina cyanopus (G.F. Atk.) Singer (1950)
- Pholiotina dasypus (Romagn.) P.-A. Moreau (2005)
- Pholiotina flava (Peck) Hauskn., Krisai & Voglmayr (2004)
- Pholiotina galerinoides Contu (1997)
- Pholiotina glutinosa E. Horak & Hauskn. (2002)
- Pholiotina gracilenta (Watling & G.M. Taylor) J.A. Cooper (2014)
- Pholiotina indica K.A. Thomas, Hauskn. & Manim. (2001)
- Pholiotina longistipitata E.F. Malysheva & Kiyashko (2017)
- Pholiotina maireiaffinis Singer (1989)
- Pholiotina mediterranea Siquier & Salom (2018)
- Pholiotina microspora Singer (1989)
- Pholiotina pilosa E. Horak, Hauskn. & Desjardin (2002)
- Pholiotina pleurocystidiata Hauskn. & Krisai (2020)
- Pholiotina plumbeitincta (G.F. Atk.) Hauskn., Krisai & Voglmayr (2004)
- Pholiotina pseudoampullaceocystis Karich (2020)
- Pholiotina resinosocystidiata E. Horak & Hauskn. (2002)
- Pholiotina rimosa (Velen.) Hauskn. & Svrček (1999)
- Pholiotina rostraticystidiata E. Ludw. (2007)
- Pholiotina sulcata Arnolds & Hauskn. (2003)
- Pholiotina veregregia Contu (1997)
- Pholiotina vesiculosa E. Horak & Hauskn. (2002)
- Pholiotina viscidula Contu (1990)
