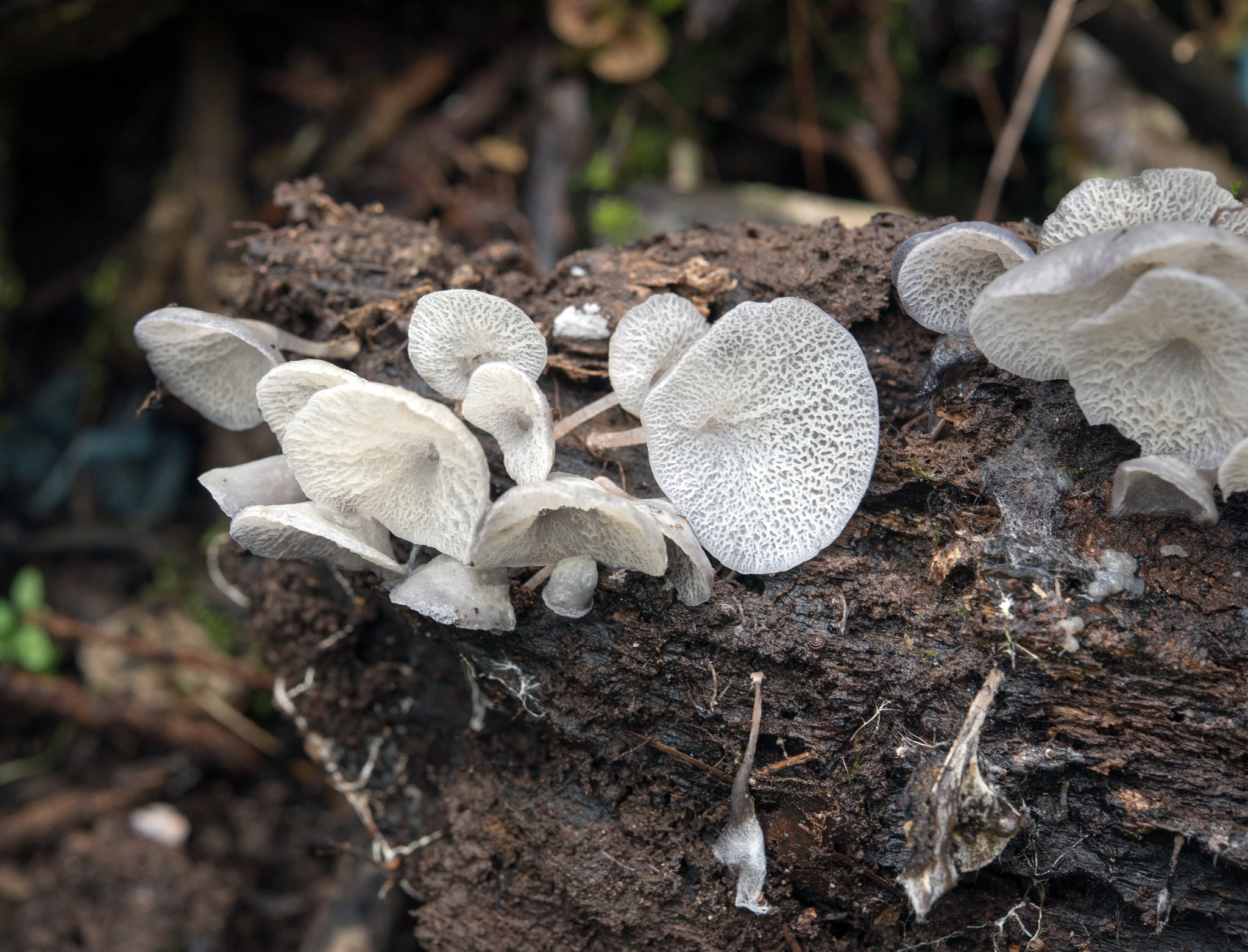

Scientific classification
- Domain: Eukaryota
- Kingdom: Fungi
- Division: Basidiomycota
- Class: Agaricomycetes
- Order: Agaricales
- Family: Bolbitiaceae
- Genus: Rhodoarrhenia; Singer (1964)

Type species
- Rhodoarrhenia pezizoidea (Speg.) Singer (1964)

Species
- R. albocremea; R. cyphelloides; R. flabellulum; R. nobilis; R. pensilis; R. pezizoidea; R. solomonensis; R. vitellina

= Rhodoarrhenia =

Genus of fungi

Rhodoarrhenia is a genus of fungi in the family Bolbitiaceae. Most species of the genus Rhodoarrhenia have a tropical or subtropical distribution. The genus was circumscribed by mycologist Rolf Singer in 1963. He made R. pezizoidea the type species; in its taxonomic history, this fungus had been placed in the genera Merulius, Campanella, Rimbachia, and Arrhenia by various authors.

== See also ==
- List of Agaricales genera
