= Psilocybe oaxacana =

Scientific classification
- Domain: Eukaryota
- Kingdom: Fungi
- Division: Basidiomycota
- Class: Agaricomycetes
- Order: Agaricales
- Family: Hymenogastraceae
- Genus: Psilocybe
- Species: P. oaxacana

Binomial name
- Psilocybe oaxacana Guzmán, Escalona & J.Q. Jacobs (2004)

Species of fungus

Psilocybe oaxacana is a species of psychedelic mushroom in the family Hymenogastraceae native to Oaxaca, Mexico. It is in the Psilocybe fagicola complex with Psilocybe fagicola, Psilocybe banderillensis, Psilocybe columbiana, Psilocybe herrerae, Psilocybe keralensis, Psilocybe neoxalapensis, and Psilocybe teofiloi.

== See also ==
- List of Psilocybe species
- List of Psilocybin mushrooms
- Psilocybe
