= Galerella =

Galerella may refer to:

- Galerella (fungus), a genus of fungi in the family Bolbitiaceae
- Galerella (mammal), a genus of mammals in the family Herpestidae
