= Psilocybe keralensis =

Scientific classification
- Kingdom: Fungi
- Division: Basidiomycota
- Class: Agaricomycetes
- Order: Agaricales
- Family: Hymenogastraceae
- Genus: Psilocybe
- Species: P. keralensis

Binomial name
- Psilocybe keralensis K.A. Thomas, Manim. and Guzmán (2002)

Species of fungus

Psilocybe keralensis is a species of psilocybin mushroom in the family Hymenogastraceae. It contains the compounds psilocybin and psilocin. Psilocybe keralensis is known from Kerala, India, Thailand, southeast Tibet, and Yunnan, China. It is in the Psilocybe fagicola complex with Psilocybe fagicola, Psilocybe oaxacana, Psilocybe banderillensis, Psilocybe columbiana, Psilocybe herrerae, Psilocybe neoxalapensis, and Psilocybe teofiloi.

== See also ==
- List of psilocybin mushrooms
- List of Psilocybe species
