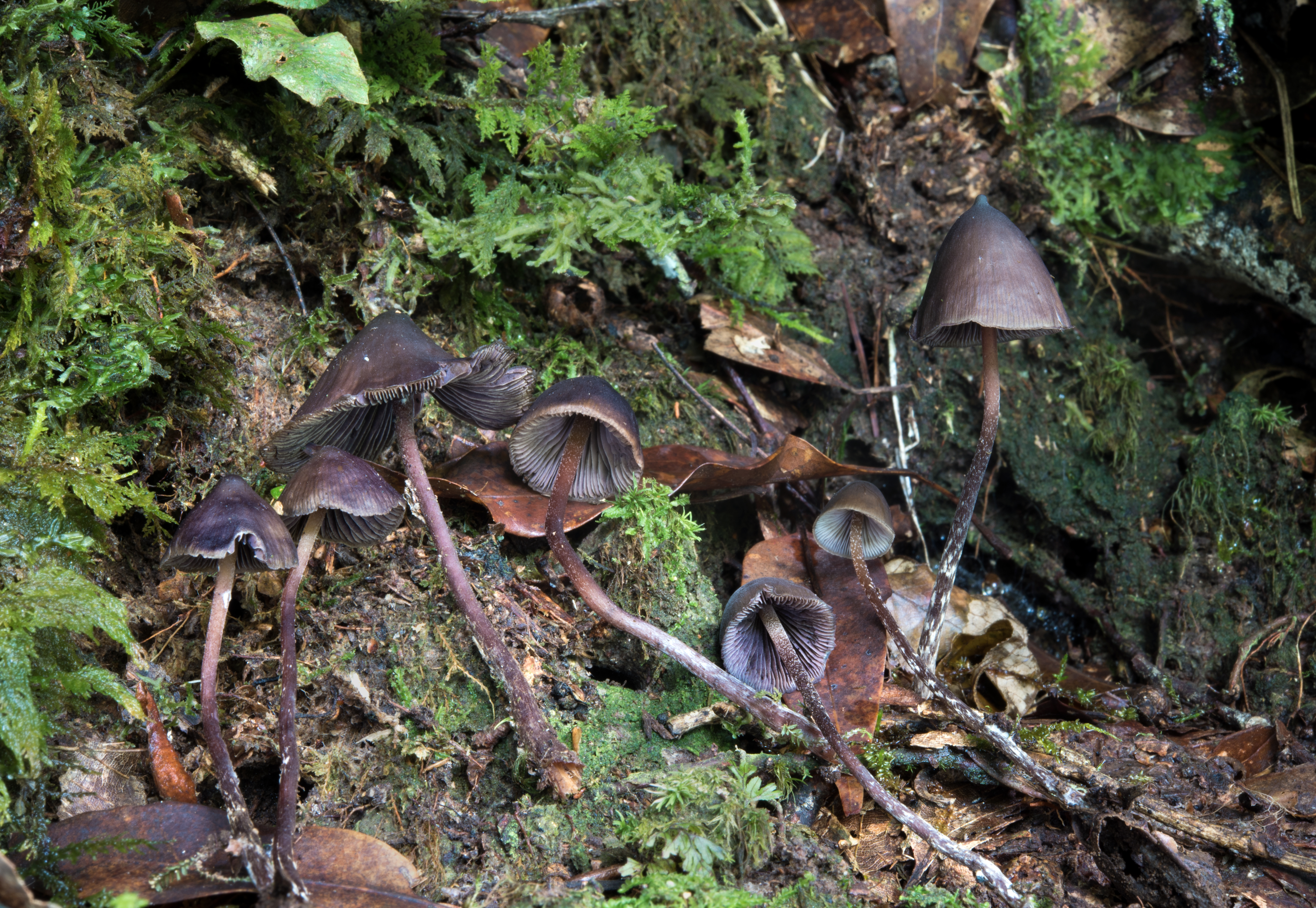

Scientific classification
- Kingdom: Fungi
- Division: Basidiomycota
- Class: Agaricomycetes
- Order: Agaricales
- Family: Hymenogastraceae
- Genus: Psilocybe
- Species: P. neoxalapensis

Binomial name
- Psilocybe neoxalapensis Guzmán, Ram.-Guill. & Halling (2009)

Synonyms
- Psilocybe novoxalapensis Guzmán & J.Q.Jacobs (2005)

= Psilocybe neoxalapensis =

Species of mushroom

Psilocybe neoxalapensis is a species of psilocybin mushroom in the family Hymenogastraceae. Found in Veracruz, Mexico, it was originally described in 2005 under the name Psilocybe novoxalapensis, but this naming was later determined to be invalid, and it was renamed P. neoxalapensis in 2009. It is in the Psilocybe fagicola complex with Psilocybe fagicola, Psilocybe oaxacana, Psilocybe banderillensis, Psilocybe columbiana, Psilocybe keralensis, Psilocybe herrerae, and Psilocybe teofiloi.

== Description ==
- Pileus: The cap of P. neoxalapensis is 8–30 mm (0.3–1.2 in) in diameter. The shape is conical to campanulate (bell-shaped), often with a prominent papilla (a nipple-shaped structure), and does not change shape considerably as it ages. The cap is hygrophanous, meaning it assumes different colors depending on its state of hydration. When it is moist, the cap is dark reddish brown to chocolate brown, sometimes in the center, occasionally with a greenish-blue tinge. When moist, radial lines can be seen through the cap that correspond to the positions of the gills underneath. When the cap is dry, it becomes much paler, a light yellow-brown to olivaceus brown color.
- Gills: On the underside of the mushroom's cap, there are narrow gills that are moderately crowded together, and they have an adnexed to sinuate attachment to the stipe. They are initially cream colored, and becomes dark purple-brown with a lighter edge as the spores mature.
- Spore print: deep reddish purple-brown color
- Stipe: The slender reddish-brown stipe is 30–50 mm (1–2 in) long by 1–2 mm thick, and usually slightly thicker towards the base. The color is paler towards the apex and the lower half is covered by small, floccose whitish fibrils. The stem base has a long whitish pseudorhiza which can be up to 150 mm. The flesh is thin and membrane-like, white to brownish.
- Veil: The mushroom has a thin cobweb-like partial veil that does not last long before disappearing; sometimes, the partial veil leaves an annular zone on the stipe that may be darkened by spores.
- Taste and odor: farinaceous and slightly of oil paint
- Stain: All parts of the mushroom can stain a bluish color if handled or bruised, however there is so much natural reddish to brown pigment that the blue bruising is difficult to see.

=== Microscopic characteristics ===
In deposit, the spores are a deep reddish purple-brown color. The use of an optical microscope can reveal further details: the spores are subellipsoid when seen in side view, and rhomboid in frontal view, with dimensions of (3.5-) 5 - 6 (-7) by 6.5–8.5 μm. The basidia (spore bearing cells of the hymenium), are 14-25 by 4.5-7.5 μm, four-spored. The cheilocystidia (cystidia on the gill edge) have two forms - Type A is narrowly lageniform and measures 15–27 by 5–7 μm, often branched at the apex and type two are subventricose-subcylindrical or narrowly utriform, measuring 25 - 32 x 6 - 9 μm.

== See also ==
- List of psilocybin mushrooms
- List of Psilocybe species
