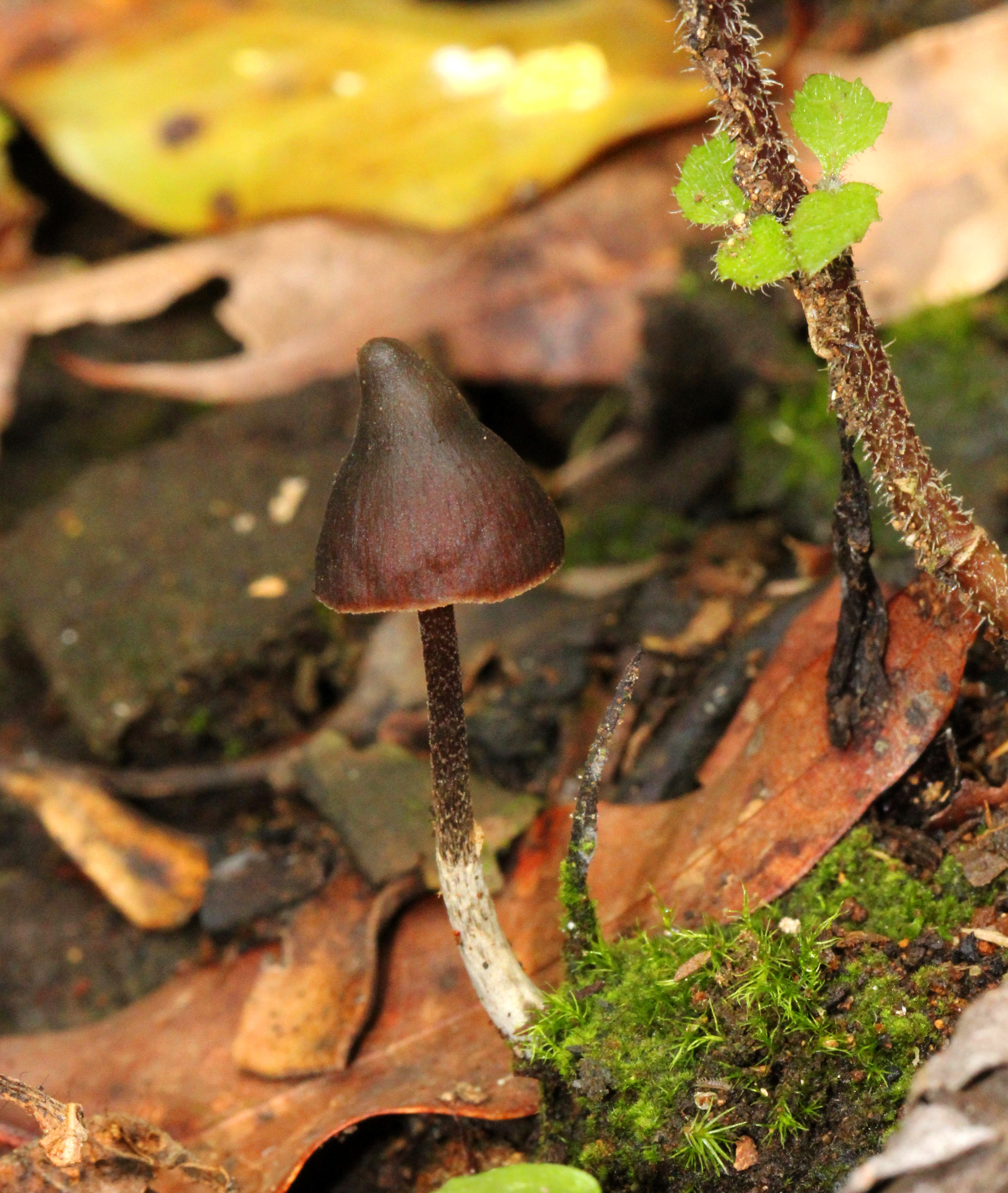
- Psilocybe banderillensis

Scientific classification
- Domain: Eukaryota
- Kingdom: Fungi
- Division: Basidiomycota
- Class: Agaricomycetes
- Order: Agaricales
- Family: Hymenogastraceae
- Genus: Psilocybe
- Species: P. banderillensis

Binomial name
- Psilocybe banderillensis Guzmán (1978)

= Psilocybe banderillensis =

Species of fungus

Psilocybe banderillensis is a species of psilocybin mushroom in the family Hymenogastraceae known from the states of Veracruz and Oaxaca in Mexico. It is in the Psilocybe fagicola complex with Psilocybe fagicola, Psilocybe oaxacana, Psilocybe columbiana, Psilocybe herrerae, Psilocybe keralensis, Psilocybe neoxalapensis, and Psilocybe teofiloi.

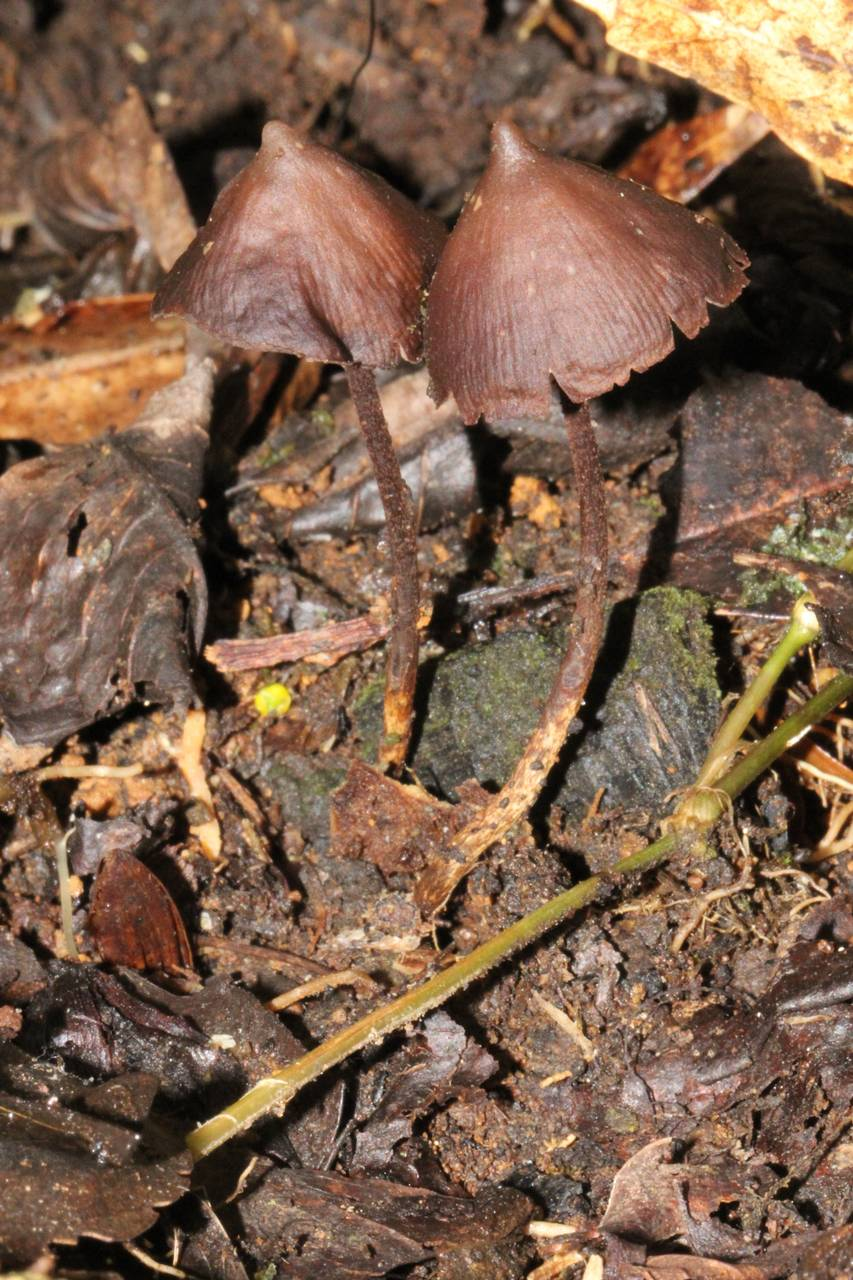
Psilocybe banderillensis

== See also ==
- List of Psilocybe species
- List of psilocybin mushrooms
