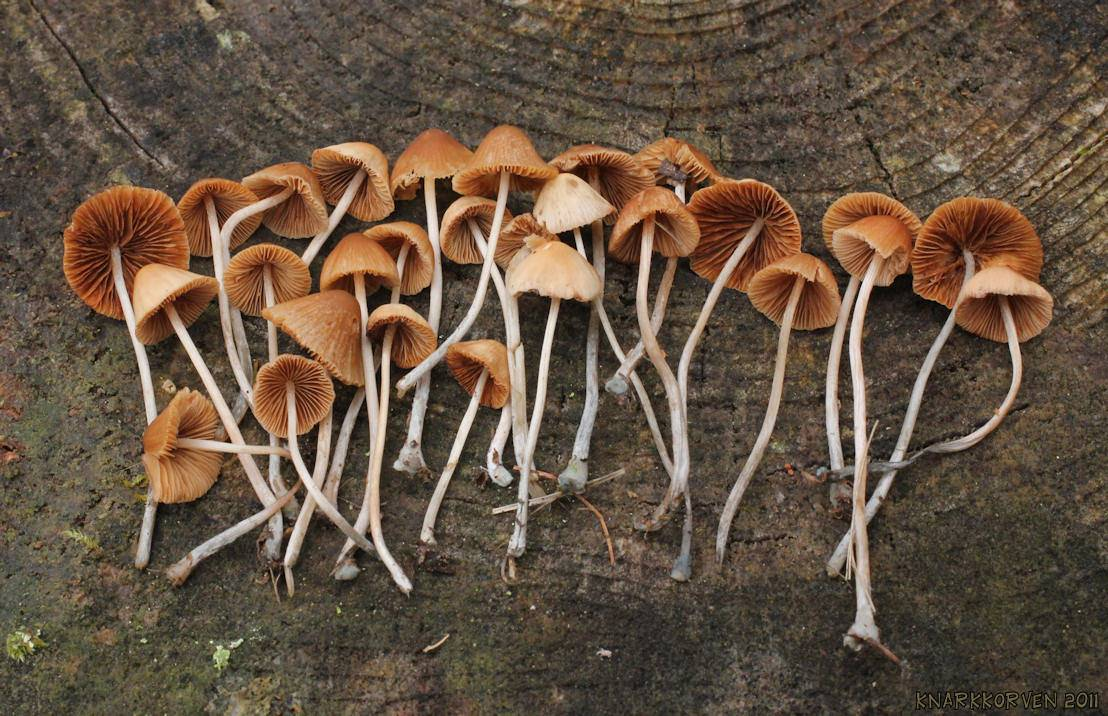
- Pholiotina smithii

Scientific classification
- Kingdom: Fungi
- Division: Basidiomycota
- Class: Agaricomycetes
- Order: Agaricales
- Family: Bolbitiaceae
- Genus: Pholiotina; Fayod (1889)

Type species
- Pholiotina vexans (P.D.Orton) Bon (1991)

Species
- List of Pholiotina species

= Pholiotina =

Genus of fungi

Pholiotina is a genus of small agaric fungi. It was circumscribed by Swiss mycologist Victor Fayod in 1889 for Conocybe-like species with partial veils. The genus has since been expanded to include species lacking partial veils.

== Taxonomic details ==
The genus Pholiotina is defined as small thin Mycena-like mushrooms, with an hymenoderm pileipellis, a dry cap surface, cystidia that are sub-capitate to blunt, and spores which are rusty brown in deposit. Spores of mushrooms of this genus are thick walled, smooth and have a germ pore.

Victor Fayod designated Pholiotina blattaria as the type species of Pholiotina, but this name was used for many different species of Pholiotina with partial veils and it is unclear which species is really P. blattaria, which makes it a nomen dubium. He designated a lectotype for this species in the same publication, and microscopic examination revealed that this specimen belongs to the species P. vexans, making P. vexans the current type species of Pholiotina.

Some authors considered Pholiotina part of the genus Conocybe. However, a molecular phylogenetics study has shown that, while Pholiotina as currently defined is polyphyletic, the three clades that have been placed in Pholiotina are more closely related to other genera than to Conocybe. The two genera can be distinguished microscopically: Pholiotina contains a differentiated central zone called a mediostratum that is lacking in Conocybe. Additionally, most Pholiotina species have cystidia with rounded to tapered tips, compared to the enlarged, globular cystidial tips of Conocybe.

In a 2007 publication, Hausknecht and Krisai-Greilhuber devised an infrageneric classification that includes the sections Piliferae and Vestitae, and the series Aeruginosa, Aporos, Appendiculata, Brunnea, Coprophila, Filipes, Keniensis, Mairei, Pygmaeoaffinis, Resinosocystidiata, Sulcata, Teneroides, Utriformis, and Vexans. However, a 2013 study by Tóth et al. found Pholiotina as it is currently defined to be polyphyletic, with one clade forming the sister group to Descolea, another forming the sister group to Bolbitius and another forming the sister group to Galerella nigeriensis. All the species of Pholiotina with partial veils and some species without, including the type species, P. vexans, formed a monophyletic clade closely related to Descolea. It is likely that the species in this clade will be kept as Pholiotina species, while the species in the other two clades will be removed to other genera, but this has not happened yet. This study also found some of the sections named by Hausknecht and Krisai-Greilhuber to be paraphyletic or polyphyletic.

== Notable species ==
The genus Pholiotina includes the psychoactive species P. cyanopus. As Pholiotina was polyphyletic under its previous definition, many species were subsequently transferred to other genera.
