= Rimbachia paradoxa =

Scientific classification
- Kingdom: Fungi
- Division: Basidiomycota
- Class: Agaricomycetes
- Order: Agaricales
- Family: Tricholomataceae
- Genus: Rimbachia
- Species: R. paradoxa

Binomial name
- Rimbachia paradoxa Pat. (1891)

Species of fungus

Rimbachia is a species of fungus in the family Tricholomataceae, and the type species of the genus Rimbachia. It was first described scientifically by the French mycologist Narcisse Théophile Patouillard in 1891.

== Description ==
The fruit bodies of Rimbachia paradoxa are somewhat flattened, with the cap is attached to the stipe at an angle, and the spore-bearing surface (the hymenium) is reticulate and gill-like. The fungus is saprobic, with its fruit bodies growing on dead wood.
