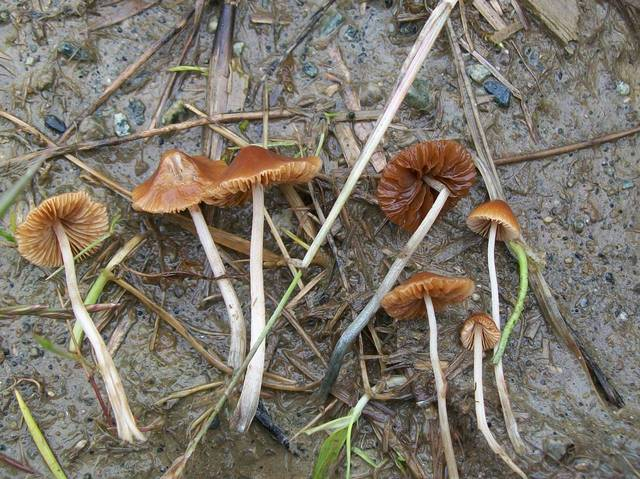

Scientific classification
- Kingdom: Fungi
- Division: Basidiomycota
- Class: Agaricomycetes
- Order: Agaricales
- Family: Bolbitiaceae
- Genus: Conocybula
- Species: C. cyanopus

Binomial name
- Conocybula cyanopus (G.F.Atk.) T. Bau & H. B. Song (2024)
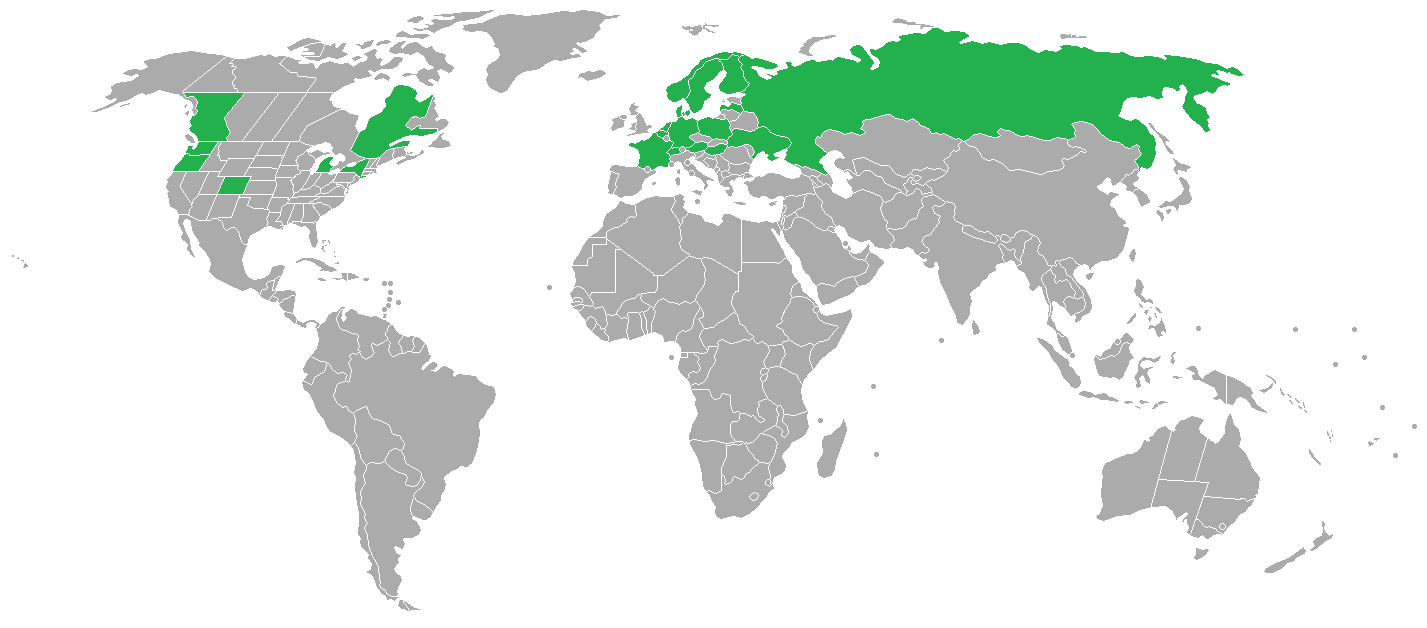
- Approximate range

Synonyms
- List: Galerula cyanopus G.F. Atk. (1918); Conocybe cyanopoda (G.F. Atk.) Kühner (1935); Galera cyanopes Kauffman (1918); Pholiotina cyanopus (G.F. Atk.) Singer (1950)

= Conocybula cyanopus =

Conocybula cyanopus
- Mycological characteristics
- Gills on hymenium
- Cap is conical or convex
- Hymenium is adnate
- Stipe is bare
- Spore print is brown
- Ecology is saprotrophic
- Edibility is psychoactive

Conocybula cyanopus is a species of fungus that contains psychoactive indole alkaloids including psilocybin and the uncommon aeruginascin. Originally described as Galerula cyanopus by American mycologist George Francis Atkinson in 1918. It was transferred to Conocybe by Robert Kühner in 1935 before being transferred to Pholiotina by Rolf Singer in 1950 and finally to Conocybula by T. Bau & H. B. Song in 2024. Conocybula cyanopus is recognized as the type species of Conocybula sect. Cyanopodae.

While the taxon Conocybula smithii has sometimes been considered as a junior synonym of Conocybula cyanopus, this much more common species differs by distribution, DNA barcode, and the length of cheilocystidia and pileocystidia.

== Description ==
Conocybula cyanopus is a small saprotrophic mushroom with a conic to broadly convex cap which is smooth and colored ocher to cinnamon brown. It is usually less than 25 mm across and the margin is striate, often with fibrous remnants of the partial veil. The gills are adnate and close, colored cinnamon brown with whitish edges near the margin, darkening in age. The spores are cinnamon brown, smooth and ellipsoid with a germ pore, measuring 8 × 5 micrometers. The cheilocystidia are shorter than 50 μm and pileocystidia measure less than 70 μm, differentiating it from the closely related Conocybula smithii which has longer cheilocystidia and much longer pileocystidia. The stem is smooth and fragile, whitish at the bottom and brownish at the top, 2–4 cm long, 1 to 1.5 mm thick, and is equal width for most of the length, often swelling at the base. The stem lacks an annulus (ring) and the base usually stains blue. The cap color lightens when it dries, turning a tan color.

Like some other grassland hallucinogenic mushroom species such as Psilocybe semilanceata, Psilocybe mexicana and Psilocybe tampanensis, Conocybula cyanopus may form sclerotia, a dormant form of the organism, which affords it some protection from wildfires and other natural disasters.

== Distribution and habitat ==
Conocybula cyanopus grows in lawns, fields, and grassy areas in temperate areas of North America, Europe and Asia. It can be found in Austria, Belgium, Canada, Denmark, Finland, France, Germany, Hungary, Latvia, the Netherlands, Norway, Poland, Russia, Sweden, Switzerland, Ukraine and the United States. It has also been reported from the United Kingdom but these reports are doubtful. Within Canada, it has been found in British Columbia and Quebec. Within the United States, it has been found in Colorado, Michigan, New York, Oregon and Washington. Within Russia, it has been found in the Sakha Republic and the Sikhote-Alin mountains and . It is rare where it occurs.

== Edibility ==
Conocybula cyanopus is hallucinogenic, containing the indole alkaloids psilocin, psilocybin, baeocystin, norbaeocystin and aeruginascin. Paul Stamets stated in 1996 that fruit bodies of Co. cyanopus have been found to contain anywhere from 0.33 to 1.01% (of dry weight) psilocybin, 0–0.007% psilocin, and 0.12–0.20% baeocystin. A more recent study found a collection of Co. cyanopus from Poland to contain 0.90±0.08% psilocybin, 0.17±0.01% psilocin, 0.16±0.01% baeocystin, 0.053±0.004% norbaeocystin and 0.011±0.0007% aeruginascin. Most mycologists advise against eating this mushroom because it is easy to mistake with the highly toxic Pholiotina rugosa.

== Legality ==
The legal status of psilocybin mushrooms varies worldwide. Psilocybin and psilocin are listed as Class A (United Kingdom) or Schedule I (US) drugs under the United Nations 1971 Convention on Psychotropic Substances. The possession and use of psilocybin mushrooms, including Co. cyanopus, is therefore prohibited by extension. However, in many national, state, and provincial drug laws, there is a great deal of ambiguity about the legal status of psilocybin producing organisms in general.

== See also ==
- Psilocybin mushrooms
- List of Psilocybin mushrooms
