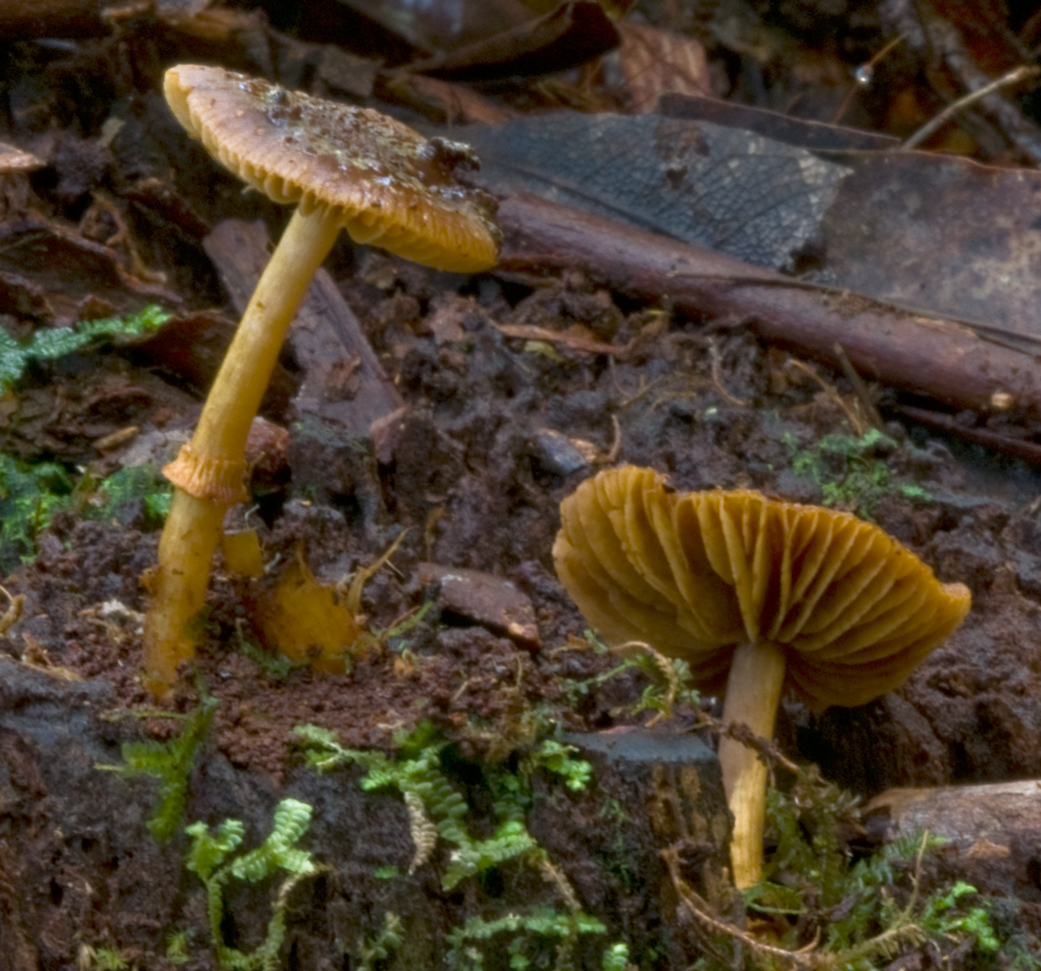
- Descolea recedens

Scientific classification
- Kingdom: Fungi
- Division: Basidiomycota
- Class: Agaricomycetes
- Order: Agaricales
- Family: Bolbitiaceae
- Genus: Descolea; Singer (1952)

Type species
- Descolea antarctica Singer (1952)

Synonyms
- Pseudodescolea Raithelh. (1980)

= Descolea =

Genus of fungi

Descolea is a genus of fungi in the family Bolbitiaceae. Described by mycologist Rolf Singer in 1952, the widespread genus contains about 15 species. It was formerly placed in the family Cortinariaceae because of its limoniform basidiospores and its ectomycorrhizal lifestyle. A 2013 molecular phylogenetics study by Tóth et al. found it to be closely related to the genus Pholiotina The genus Pseudodescolea, erected for the single Descolea-like species Pseudodescolea lepiotiformis, was formerly considered distinct until a 1990 study found it to be a synonym of Descolea antarctica.

The genus name of Descolea is in honour of Horacio Raúl Descole (1910-1984), who was an Argentine apothecary, biochemist and botanist.

== Species ==
- Descolea alba Kuhar, Nouhra & M.E. Sm. (2017)
- Descolea albella (Massee & Rodway) Kuhar, Nouhra & M.E. Sm. (2017)
- Descolea alienata E.Horak & Desjardin (1996)
- Descolea angustispora E.Horak & Desjardin (1996)
- Descolea antarctica (A.A. Francis & Bougher) Kuhar, Nouhra & M.E. Sm. (2017)
- Descolea archeureta (Halling) Kuhar, Nouhra & M.E. Sm. (2017)
- Descolea australiensis (G.W. Beaton, Pegler & T.W.K. Young) Kuhar, Nouhra & M.E. Sm. (2017)
- Descolea brunnea (E. Horak) Kuhar, Nouhra & M.E. Sm. (2017)
- Descolea ferruginea (J.W. Cribb) Kuhar, Nouhra & M.E. Sm. (2017)
- Descolea flavoannulata (Lj.N.Vassiljeva) E.Horak (1971)
- Descolea giachinii (Trappe, V.L. Oliveira, Castellano & Claridge) Kuhar, Nouhra & M.E. Sm. (2017)
- Descolea gunnii (Berk. ex Massee) E.Horak (1971)
- Descolea inferna Kuhar, Nouhra & M.E. Sm. (2017)
- Descolea javanica (Höhn.) Kuhar, Nouhra & M.E. Sm. (2017)
- Descolea macrospora (G. Cunn.) Kuhar, Nouhra & M.E. Sm. (2017)
- Descolea maculata Bougher 1986 — Australia
- Descolea pallida E. Horak (1971)
- Descolea phlebophora E. Horak (1971)
- Descolea pretiosa E. Horak (1971)
- Descolea quercina J. Khan & Naseer (2017)
- Descolea recedens (Sacc.) Singer (1955)
- Descolea reticulata Kuhar, Nouhra & M.E. Sm. (2017)
- Descolea squarrosipes E. Horak (1971)
- Descolea subtropica (J.W. Cribb) Kuhar, Nouhra & M.E. Sm. (2017)
