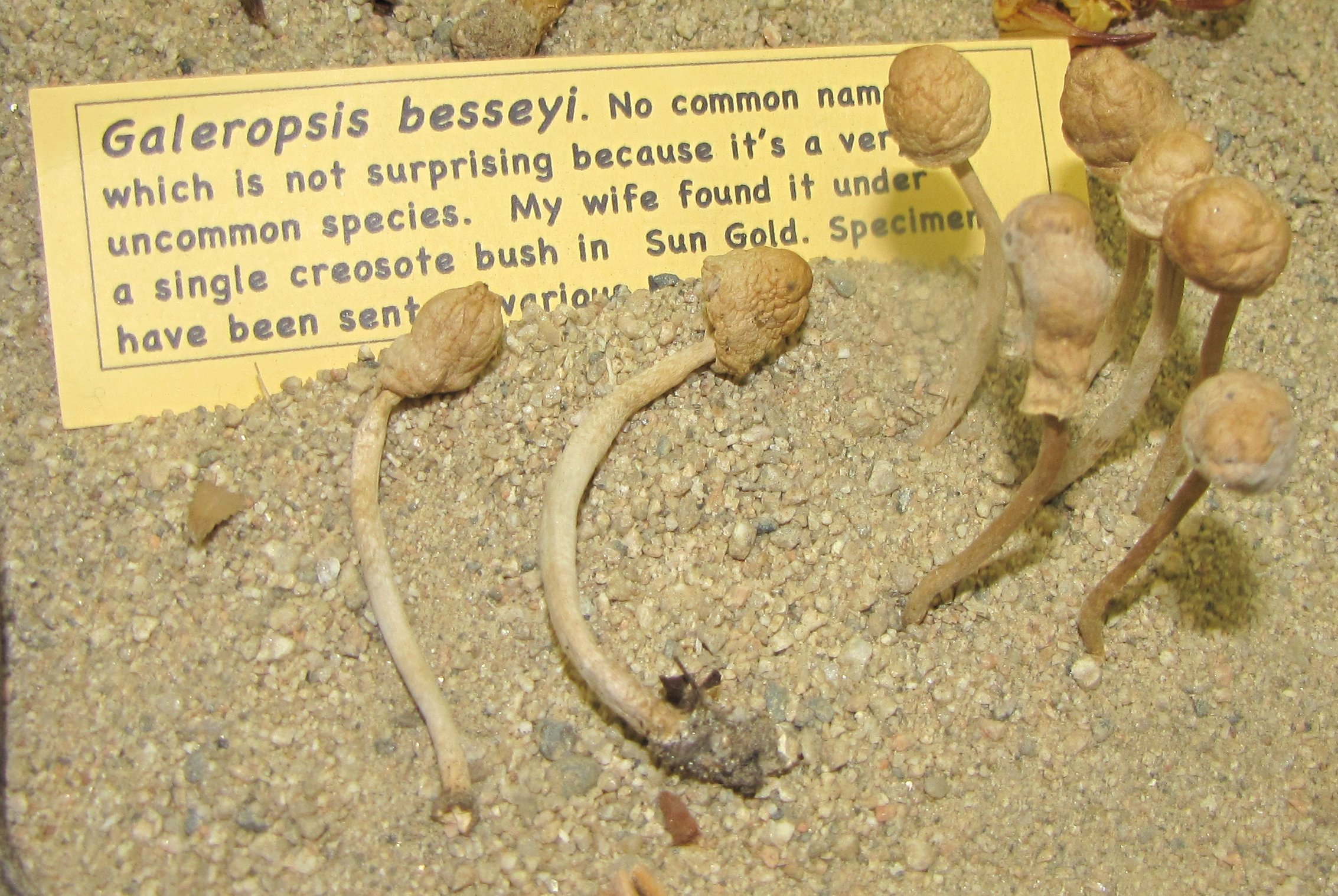
- Galeropsis besseyi

Scientific classification
- Kingdom: Fungi
- Division: Basidiomycota
- Class: Agaricomycetes
- Order: Agaricales
- Family: Bolbitiaceae
- Genus: Galeropsis; Velen. (1930)

Type species
- Galeropsis desertorum Velen. & Dvořák (1930)

Species
- 16 species

Synonyms
- Conocybe subgen. Cyttarophyllum R.Heim (1931); Psammomyces Lebedeva (1932); Cyttarophyllum (R.Heim) Singer (1936)

= Galeropsis =

Genus of fungi

Galeropsis is a genus of fungi in the Bolbitiaceae family of mushrooms. The genus is widespread in dry, arid habitats, and contains 16 species. Galeropsis was circumscribed by the Czech botanist Josef Velenovský in 1930.

== Species ==
- Galeropsis allospora
- Galeropsis andina
- Galeropsis angusticeps
- Galeropsis aporos
- Galeropsis besseyi
- Galeropsis bispora
- Galeropsis deceptiva
- Galeropsis desertorum
- Galeropsis liberata
- Galeropsis madagascariensis
- Galeropsis mitriformis
- Galeropsis paradoxa
- Galeropsis plantaginiformis
- Galeropsis polytrichoides
