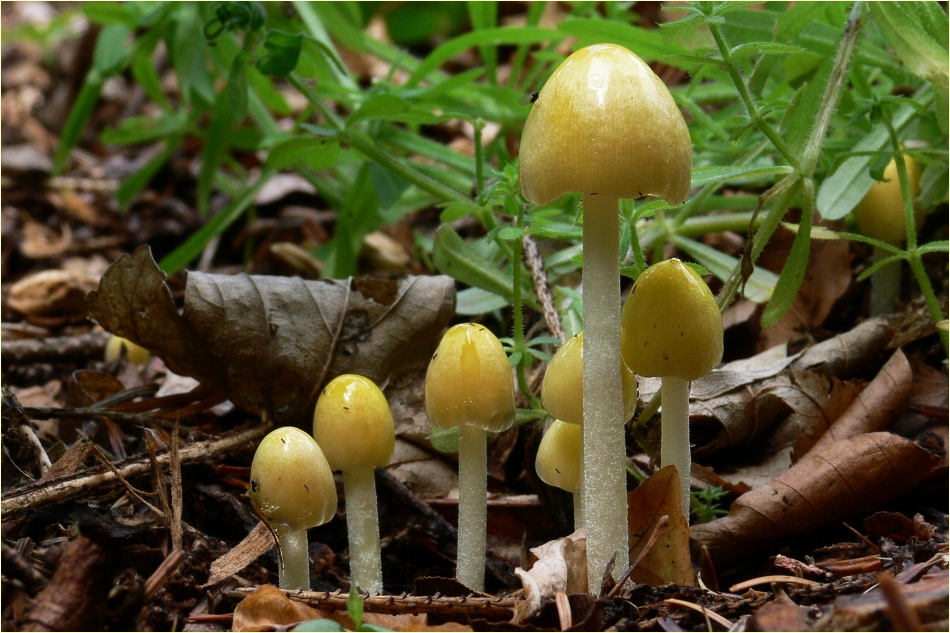

Scientific classification
- Kingdom: Fungi
- Division: Basidiomycota
- Class: Agaricomycetes
- Order: Agaricales
- Family: Bolbitiaceae
- Genus: Bolbitius
- Species: B. titubans

Binomial name
- Bolbitius titubans (Bull.) Fr.

Synonyms
- Bolbitius vitellinus (Pers.) Fr.

= Bolbitius titubans =

Species of fungus

Bolbitius titubans
- Mycological characteristics
- Gills on hymenium
- Cap is ovate or flat
- Hymenium is adnate or free
- Stipe is bare
- Spore print is brown
- Ecology is saprotrophic
- Edibility is edible, but unpalatable

Bolbitius titubans, commonly known as the Yellow Fieldcap, is a widespread species of gilled mushroom found on every continent excluding Antarctica. It belongs to the family Bolbitiaceae and is one of the most commonly recognizable mushrooms in open landscapes. This species was described by French mycologist Jean Baptiste Francois Pierre Bulliard in 1789 under the name Agaricus titubans.

The Yellow Fieldcap is typically found in grassland habitats, meadows, and garden lawns where it fruits prolifically after periods of rain during the warm season. This mushroom can also be observed growing from straw, dung, and other decomposing organic matter highlighting its role as a saprotroph.

Despite the common name "sunny side up" this mushroom is considered inedible primarily due to its thin, fragile flesh, which deteriorates rapidly. This mushroom is not known to be toxic.

== Description ==
The mushroom cap is 1.5–7 centimetres (1/2–3 in) across, and grows from egg-shaped when young to broadly convex, finally ending up nearly flat. The cap's color starts yellow or bright yellow, and fades to whitish or greyish with age. The stem is 3–12 cm (1–4 1/2 in) tall and 2–6 millimetres (1/8–1/4 in) wide, whitish-yellow with a fine mealy powdering, and very delicate.

The fragile and soft gills are free from the stem or narrowly attached and fade from whitish or pale yellowish to rusty cinnamon with age. They produce a cinnamon-brown spore print. The spores are brown, elliptical, and smooth.

=== Similar species ===
Similar species include Bolbitius aleuriatus, B. coprophilus, B. lacteus, and Conocybe apala.

== Habitat and distribution ==
The species grows on grass, woodchips, compost, and dung. It is known to occur in North America, Europe, Asia, Africa, Oceania, and South America.

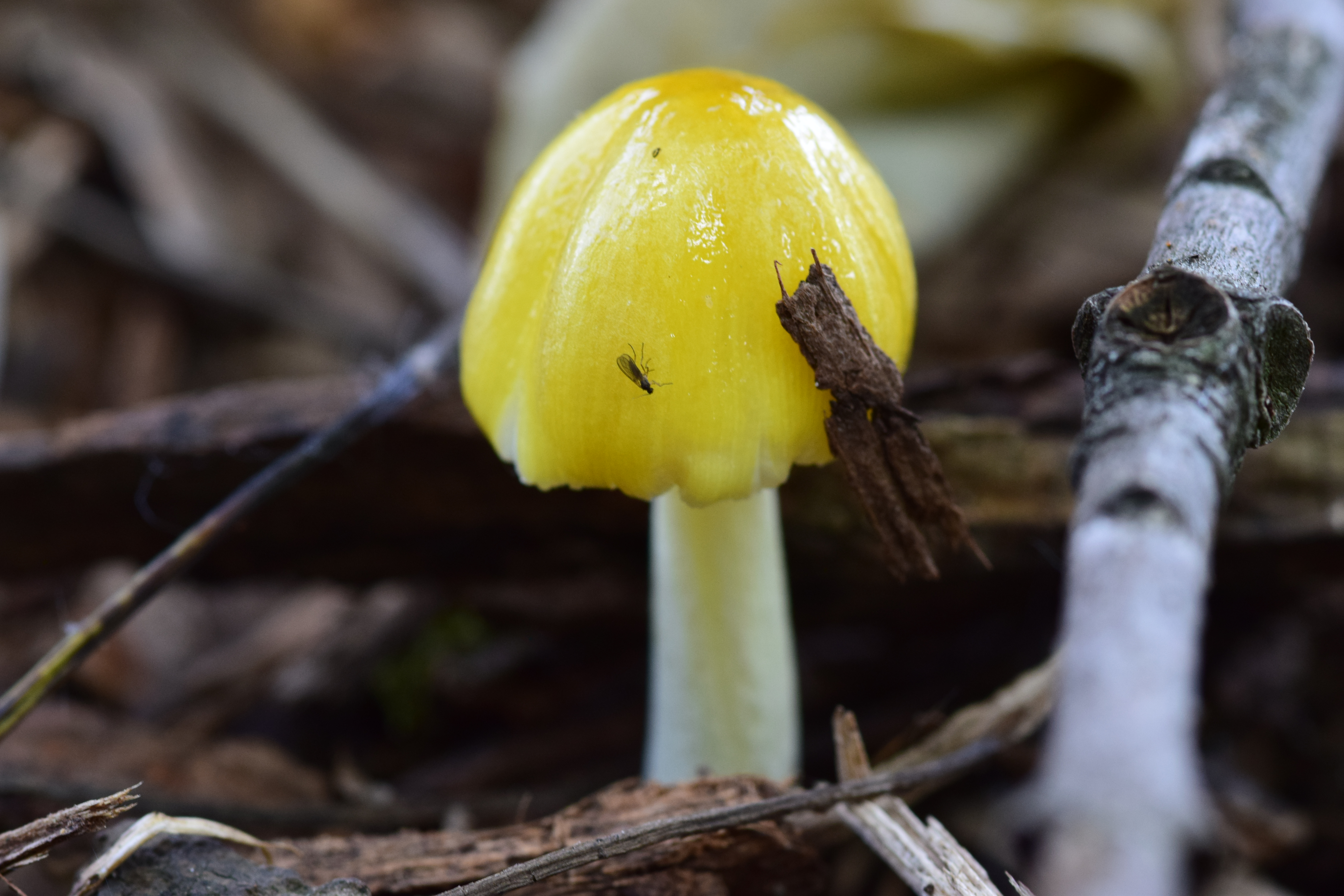
Small yellow fieldcap mushroom, Bolbitius titubans, growing in mulch. Michigan, USA

== Edibility ==
Experts do not advise eating this mushroom. While nontoxic, it is too insubstantial to be considered worthwhile.
