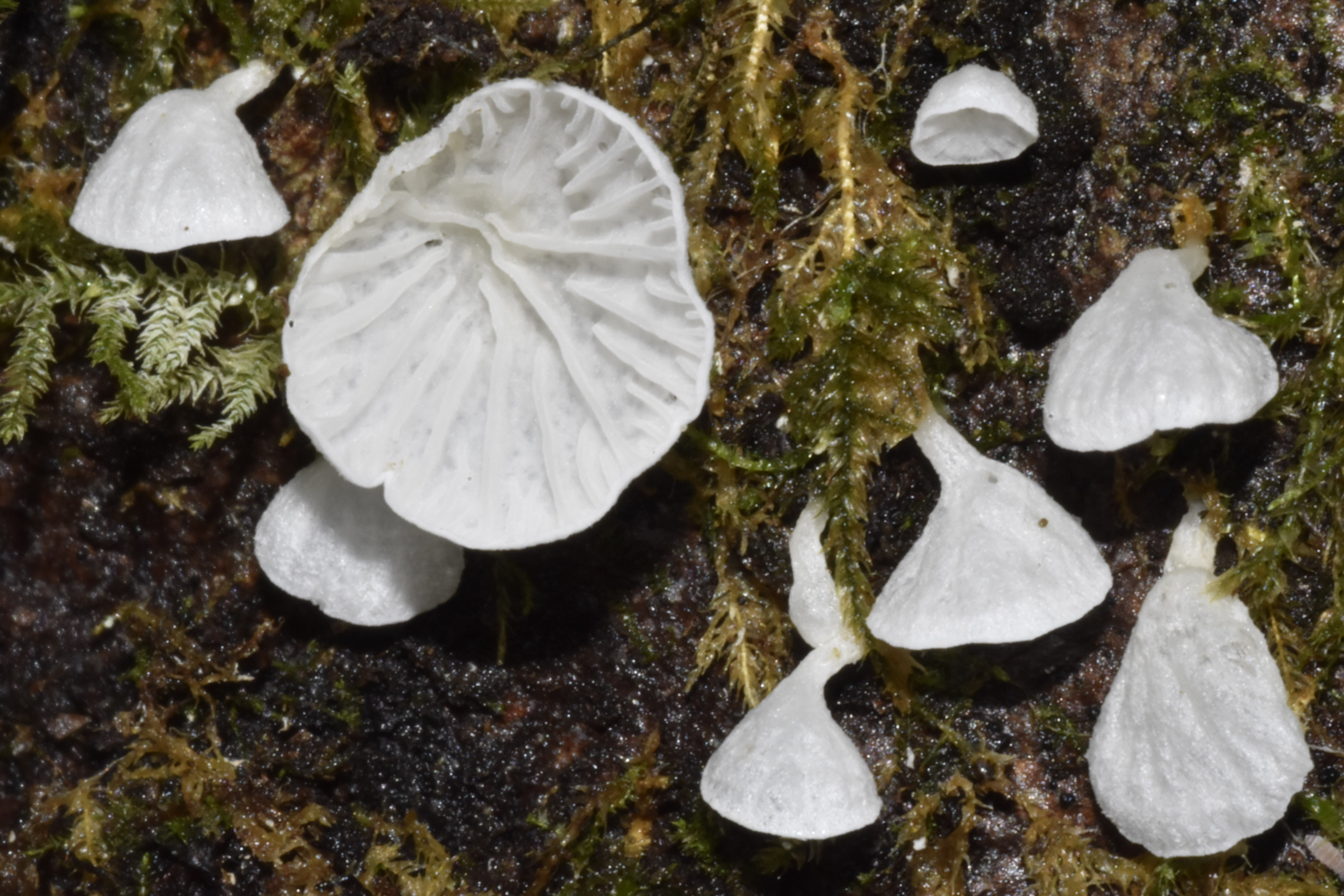
- Rimbachia bryophila

Scientific classification
- Kingdom: Fungi
- Division: Basidiomycota
- Class: Agaricomycetes
- Order: Agaricales
- Family: Tricholomataceae
- Genus: Rimbachia; Pat.

Type species
- Rimbachia paradoxa Pat.

Species
- See text

= Rimbachia =

Genus of fungi

Rimbachia is a genus of fungi in the family Tricholomataceae. The genus contains about ten species with a widespread distribution in tropical regions.

The genus name of Rimbachia was chosen in honour of August Rimbach (1862–1943), who was a German botanist (Bryology). He was between 1910-1919, Professor of Botany at the Agronomic Institute in Montevideo, Uruguay.

The genus was circumscribed by Narcisse Théophile Patouillard in Bull. Soc. Mycol. France vol.7 on page 159 in 1891.

== Species ==
As accepted by Species Fungorum;

- Rimbachia arachnoidea Redhead 1984
- Rimbachia bryophila Redhead 1984
- Rimbachia camerunensis Henn. 1901
- Rimbachia ellipsoidea Redhead 1984
- Rimbachia furfuracea Redhead 1984
- Rimbachia leucobryi Miettinen 2010
- Rimbachia neckerae Redhead 1984
- Rimbachia palmigena Singer 1966
- Rimbachia paludosa Redhead 1984
- Rimbachia paradoxa Pat. 1891
- Rimbachia philippensis Lloyd 1919
- Rimbachia spadicea Lloyd 1922

Former species;

- R. cyphelloides Lloyd (1918) = Rhodoarrhenia cyphelloides Bolbitiaceae
- R. pezizoidea (Speg.) Lloyd (1919) = Rhodoarrhenia pezizoidea Bolbitiaceae
- R. puiggarii (Speg.) Rick (1960) = Calyptella puiggarii Agaricales
- R. spathularia (Berk. & M.A. Curtis) Singer (1951) = Skepperiella spathularia Agaricales
- R. vitellina Lloyd (1918) = Rhodoarrhenia vitellina Bolbitiaceae

== See also ==
- List of Tricholomataceae genera
