= Agrogaster =

Scientific classification
- Kingdom: Fungi
- Division: Basidiomycota
- Class: Agaricomycetes
- Order: Agaricales
- Family: Bolbitiaceae
- Genus: Agrogaster; D.A.Reid (1986)

Type species
- Agrogaster coneae D.A.Reid (1986)

Genus of fungi

Agrogaster is a fungal genus in the family Bolbitiaceae. This is a monotypic genus, containing the single secotioid species Agrogaster coneae, described from New Zealand in 1986 by mycologist Derek Reid. The generic name Agrogaster combines "Agro", referring to the genus Agrocybe (from which it is thought to be derived), and "gaster", alluding to its gasteroid nature.

== See also ==
- List of Agaricales genera
