= Gymnoglossum =

Scientific classification
- Kingdom: Fungi
- Division: Basidiomycota
- Class: Agaricomycetes
- Order: Agaricales
- Family: Bolbitiaceae
- Genus: Gymnoglossum; Massee

Type species
- Gymnoglossum stipitatum Massee

Genus of fungi

Gymnoglossum is a genus of fungi in the Bolbitiaceae family of mushrooms.
