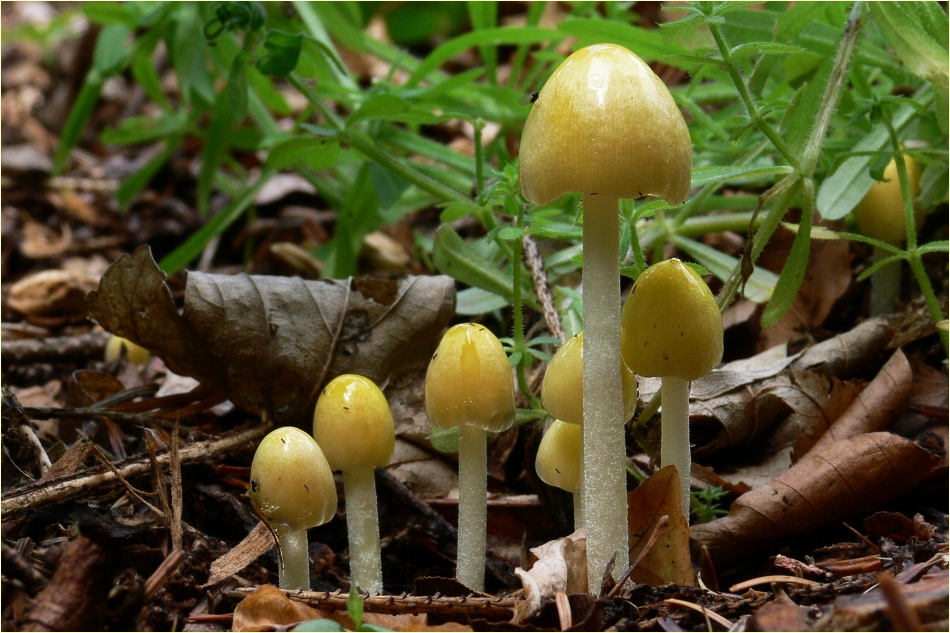
- Bolbitius titubans

Scientific classification
- Domain: Eukaryota
- Kingdom: Fungi
- Division: Basidiomycota
- Class: Agaricomycetes
- Order: Agaricales
- Family: Bolbitiaceae
- Genus: Bolbitius; Fr. (1838)

Type species
- Bolbitius vitellinus (Pers.) Fr. (1838)

Synonyms
- Agaricus subgen. Pluteolus Fr. (1874); Pluteolus (Fr.) Gillet (1876)

= Bolbitius =

Genus of fungi

Bolbitius is a genus of small mushrooms in the family Bolbitiaceae.

== Description ==
The genus Bolbitius is defined as small thin Mycena-like mushrooms, with a hymenoderm pileipellis, a glutinous cap surface, and spores that are brown in deposit. Spores of mushrooms of this genus are thick-walled, smooth and have a germ pore.

== Species ==
As of June 2015, Index Fungorum lists 54 valid species in Bolbitius:

- Bolbitius acer
- Bolbitius affinis
- Bolbitius albiceps
- Bolbitius albus
- Bolbitius alliaceus
- Bolbitius ameghinoi
- Bolbitius broadwayi
- Bolbitius bruchii
- Bolbitius brunneus
- Bolbitius caducus
- Bolbitius callistus
- Bolbitius citrinus
- Bolbitius compactus
- Bolbitius coprophilus
- Bolbitius cremeus
- Bolbitius demangei
- Bolbitius elegans
- Bolbitius excoriatus
- Bolbitius exiguus
- Bolbitius expansus
- Bolbitius ferrugineus
- Bolbitius flavellus
- Bolbitius flavus
- Bolbitius floridanus
- Bolbitius grandiusculus
- Bolbitius incarnatus
- Bolbitius intermedius
- Bolbitius jalapensis
- Bolbitius lacteus
- Bolbitius lineatus
- Bolbitius longipes
- Bolbitius luteus
- Bolbitius malesianus
- Bolbitius marginatipes
- Bolbitius mesosporus
- Bolbitius mexicanus
- Bolbitius muscicola
- Bolbitius panaeoloides
- Bolbitius perpusillus
- Bolbitius phascoides
- Bolbitius pluteoides
- Bolbitius pseudobulbillosus
- Bolbitius psittacinus
- Bolbitius reticulatus
- Bolbitius roseipes
- Bolbitius stramineus
- Bolbitius subvolvatus
- Bolbitius titubans
- Bolbitius tjibodensis
- Bolbitius tripolitanus
- Bolbitius tucumanensis
- Bolbitius versicolor
- Bolbitius viscosus
- Bolbitius yunnanensis
