= Galerella (fungus) =

Scientific classification
- Kingdom: Fungi
- Division: Basidiomycota
- Class: Agaricomycetes
- Order: Agaricales
- Family: Bolbitiaceae
- Genus: Galerella; Earle (1909)

Type species
- Galerella plicatella (Peck) Singer (1951)

Species
- Galerella fibrillosa Galerella floriformis Galerella microphues Galerella nigeriensis Galerella plicatella Galerella plicatelloides

Genus of fungi

Galerella is a genus of fungi in the Bolbitiaceae family. The widespread genus contains six species.
