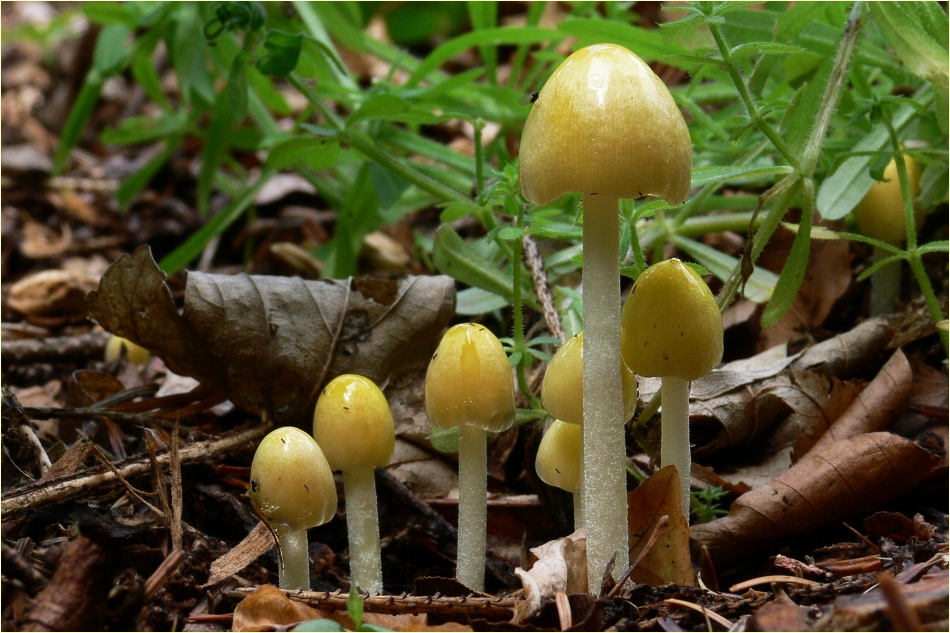
- Bolbitius titubans

Scientific classification
- Kingdom: Fungi
- Division: Basidiomycota
- Class: Agaricomycetes
- Order: Agaricales
- Family: Bolbitiaceae; Singer (1948)

Type genus
- Bolbitius Fr. (1838)

Genera
- Agrogaster; Bolbitius; Conocybe; Cyphellopus; Cyttarophyllopsis; Descolea; Galerella; Galeropsis; Gymnoglossum; Panaeolus; Pholiotina; Ptychella; Rhodoarrhenia; Tubariella; Tubariopsis; Tympanella; Wielandomyces

= Bolbitiaceae =

Family of fungi

The Bolbitiaceae are a family of mushroom-forming basidiomycete fungi. A 2008 estimate placed 17 genera and 287 species in the family. Bolbitiaceae was circumscribed by mycologist Rolf Singer in 1948.

== Description ==
This family is of mushroom-forming species that have a hymenium on gills, brown spores and a hymenoderm pileipellis.

== Differences in genera ==
Bolbitius are mushrooms which are thin, Mycena-like, with gelatinous cap surface. These lack a veil, are saprotrophic, and tend to be found with grass.

Conocybe are mushrooms which are thin, Mycena-like, with a dry cap surface. These are small and saprotrophic, and tend to be found with grass. These have cheilocystidia which are capitate.

Pholiotina are mushrooms which are thin, Mycena-like, with a dry cap surface. These are small and saprotrophic, and tend to be found with grass, and have a veil. Some have a membranous veil, mid-stipe, others the veil breaks up and can be found on the cap margin. These are separated from Conocybe in that the cheilocystidia are non-capitate.

Descolea includes Pholiotina-like mushrooms that are ectomycorrhizal and have limoniform spores.

== See also ==
- List of Agaricales families
