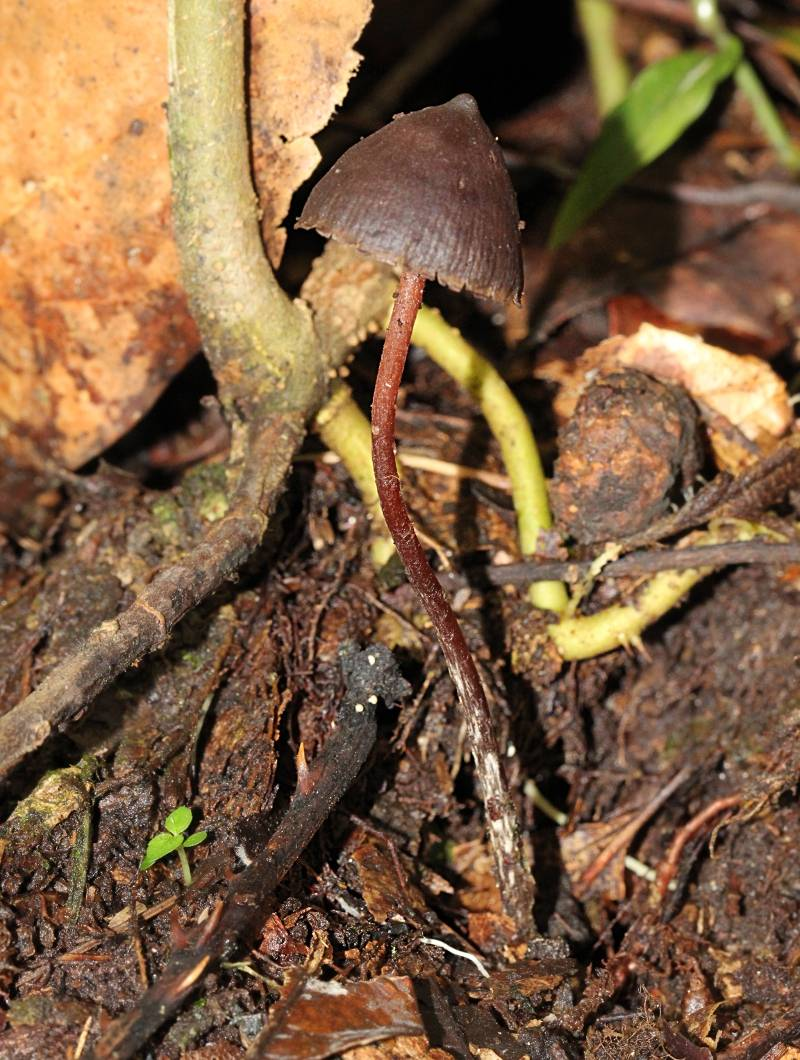
- Photographed in Veracruz, Mexico

Scientific classification
- Domain: Eukaryota
- Kingdom: Fungi
- Division: Basidiomycota
- Class: Agaricomycetes
- Order: Agaricales
- Family: Hymenogastraceae
- Genus: Psilocybe
- Species: P. fagicola

Binomial name
- Psilocybe fagicola R.Heim & Cailleux (1959)

Synonyms
- Psilocybe fagicola var. mesocystidiata Guzmán (1978); Psilocybe xalapensis Guzmán & López (1979); Psilocybe wassoniorum Guzmán & Pollock (1979)

= Psilocybe fagicola =

Species of fungus

Psilocybe fagicola is a species of psychedelic mushroom in the family Hymenogastraceae native to Mexico. The type specimen for the species was collected in 1959 in a beech forest in Hidalgo, Mexico.

== See also ==
- List of Psilocybe species
- List of Psilocybin mushrooms
- Psilocybe
