= Psilocybe collybioides =

Scientific classification
- Kingdom: Fungi
- Division: Basidiomycota
- Class: Agaricomycetes
- Order: Agaricales
- Family: Hymenogastraceae
- Genus: Psilocybe
- Species: P. collybioides

Binomial name
- Psilocybe collybioides Singer & A.H.Sm. (1958)

Species of fungus

Psilocybe collybioides is a species of agaric fungus in the family Hymenogastraceae. It was first described scientifically by mycologists Rolf Singer and Alexander H. Smith in 1958, from collections made in montane habitat near Tafí del Valle, Argentina. It is in the section Zapotecorum of the genus Psilocybe, other members of this section include Psilocybe muliercula, Psilocybe angustipleurocystidiata, Psilocybe aucklandii, Psilocybe graveolens, Psilocybe kumaenorum, Psilocybe zapotecorum, Psilocybe pintonii, Psilocybe subcaerulipes, Psilocybe moseri, Psilocybe zapotecoantillarum, Psilocybe zapotecocaribaea, and Psilocybe antioquiensis.

== See also ==
- List of psilocybin mushrooms
- Psilocybin mushrooms
