= Psilocybe kumaenorum =

Scientific classification
- Kingdom: Fungi
- Division: Basidiomycota
- Class: Agaricomycetes
- Order: Agaricales
- Family: Hymenogastraceae
- Genus: Psilocybe
- Species: P. kumaenorum

Binomial name
- Psilocybe kumaenorum R.Heim (1967)

Species of fungus

Psilocybe kumaenorum is a species of mushroom in the family Hymenogastraceae. The mushroom contains the psychoactive compound psilocybin. It is in the section Zapotecorum of the genus Psilocybe, other members of this section include Psilocybe muliercula, Psilocybe angustipleurocystidiata, Psilocybe aucklandii, Psilocybe collybioides, Psilocybe graveolens, Psilocybe zapotecorum, Psilocybe pintonii, Psilocybe subcaerulipes, Psilocybe moseri, Psilocybe zapotecoantillarum, Psilocybe zapotecocaribaea, and Psilocybe antioquiensis.

It was described in 1967 from Papua New Guinea by French mycologist Roger Heim.

== See also ==
- Original Species Description
- List of Psilocybin mushrooms
- Psilocybin mushrooms
