= Psilocybe antioquiensis =

Scientific classification
- Kingdom: Fungi
- Division: Basidiomycota
- Class: Agaricomycetes
- Order: Agaricales
- Family: Hymenogastraceae
- Genus: Psilocybe
- Species: P. antioquiensis

Binomial name
- Psilocybe antioquiensis Guzmán, Saldarr., Pineda, G.García & L.-F.Velázquez (1994)

Species of fungus

Psilocybe antioquiensis is a species of mushroom-forming fungus in the family Hymenogastraceae. It is in the section Zapotecorum of the genus Psilocybe, other members of this section include Psilocybe muliercula, Psilocybe angustipleurocystidiata, Psilocybe aucklandii, Psilocybe collybioides, Psilocybe kumaenorum, Psilocybe zapotecorum, Psilocybe kumaenorum, Psilocybe subcaerulipes, Psilocybe pintonii, Psilocybe moseri, Psilocybe zapotecoantillarum, and Psilocybe zapotecocaribaea.

== See also ==
- List of psilocybin mushrooms
- Psilocybin mushrooms
