= Psilocybe pintonii =

Scientific classification
- Kingdom: Fungi
- Division: Basidiomycota
- Class: Agaricomycetes
- Order: Agaricales
- Family: Hymenogastraceae
- Genus: Psilocybe
- Species: P. pintonii

Binomial name
- Psilocybe pintonii Guzmán

Species of fungus

Psilocybe pintonii is a species of mushroom in the family Hymenogastraceae. It is in the section Zapotecorum of the genus Psilocybe, other members of this section include Psilocybe muliercula, Psilocybe angustipleurocystidiata, Psilocybe aucklandii, Psilocybe collybioides, Psilocybe kumaenorum, Psilocybe zapotecorum, Psilocybe kumaenorum, Psilocybe subcaerulipes, Psilocybe moseri, Psilocybe zapotecoantillarum, Psilocybe zapotecocaribaea, and Psilocybe antioquiensis.

== See also ==
- List of Psilocybin mushrooms
- Psilocybin mushrooms
- Psilocybe
