= Psilocybe zapotecocaribaea =

Scientific classification
- Kingdom: Fungi
- Division: Basidiomycota
- Class: Agaricomycetes
- Order: Agaricales
- Family: Hymenogastraceae
- Genus: Psilocybe
- Species: P. zapotecocaribaea

Binomial name
- Psilocybe zapotecocaribaea Guzmán, Ram.-Guill. & T.J. Baroni

Species of fungus

Psilocybe zapotecocaribaea is a species of mushroom in the family Hymenogastraceae. The mushroom contains the medicinal compound psilocybin. It is in the section Zapotecorum of the genus Psilocybe, other members of this section include Psilocybe muliercula, Psilocybe angustipleurocystidiata, Psilocybe aucklandii, Psilocybe collybioides, Psilocybe kumaenorum, Psilocybe zapotecorum, Psilocybe kumaenorum, Psilocybe subcaerulipes, Psilocybe pintonii, Psilocybe moseri, Psilocybe zapotecoantillarum, and Psilocybe antioquiensis.

== See also ==
- List of Psilocybin mushrooms
- Psilocybin mushrooms
- Psilocybe
