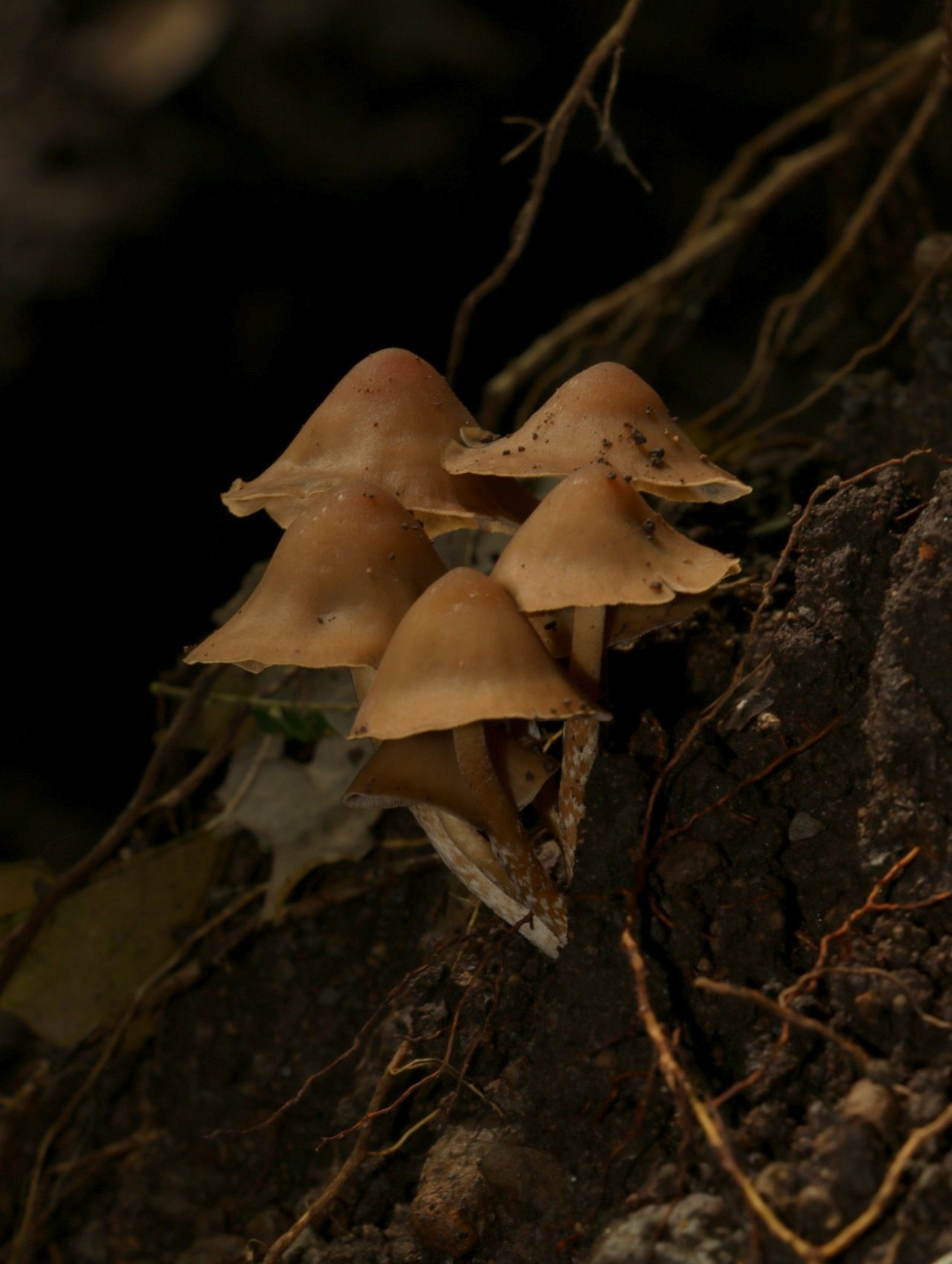

Scientific classification
- Kingdom: Fungi
- Division: Basidiomycota
- Class: Agaricomycetes
- Order: Agaricales
- Family: Hymenogastraceae
- Genus: Psilocybe
- Species: P. moseri

Binomial name
- Psilocybe moseri Guzmán

= Psilocybe moseri =

Species of fungus

Psilocybe moseri is a species of mushroom in the family Hymenogastraceae. The mushroom contains the medicinal compound psilocybin. It is in the section Zapotecorum of the genus Psilocybe, other members of this section include Psilocybe muliercula, Psilocybe angustipleurocystidiata, Psilocybe aucklandii, Psilocybe collybioides, Psilocybe kumaenorum, Psilocybe zapotecorum, Psilocybe kumaenorum, Psilocybe subcaerulipes, Psilocybe pintonii, Psilocybe zapotecoantillarum, Psilocybe zapotecocaribaea, and Psilocybe antioquiensis.

== See also ==
- List of Psilocybin mushrooms
- Psilocybin mushrooms
- Psilocybe
