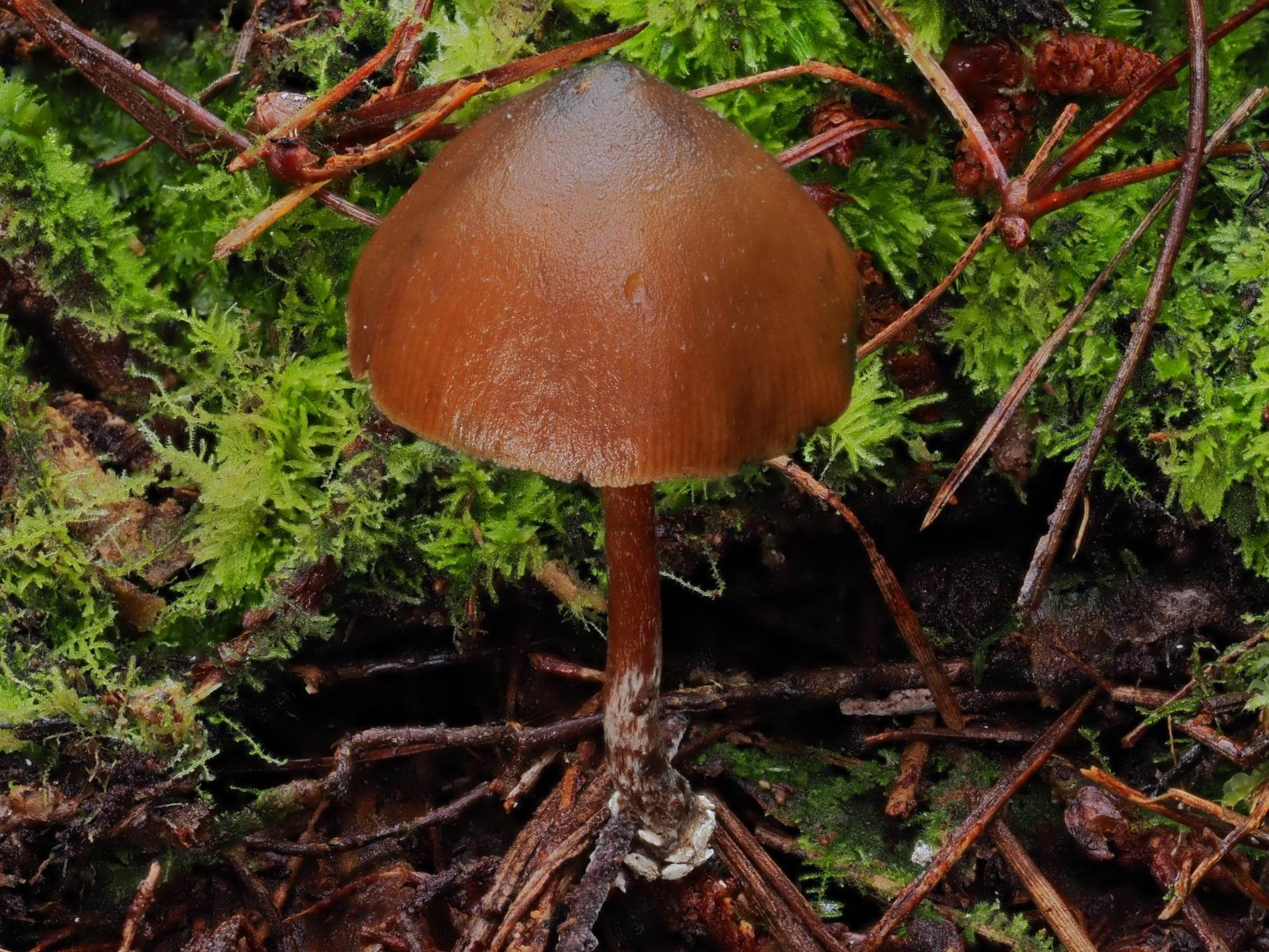

Scientific classification
- Kingdom: Fungi
- Division: Basidiomycota
- Class: Agaricomycetes
- Order: Agaricales
- Family: Hymenogastraceae
- Genus: Psilocybe
- Species: P. aucklandiae

Binomial name
- Psilocybe aucklandiae Guzmán, King and Bandala (1991)

= Psilocybe aucklandiae =

Species of agaric fungus

Psilocybe aucklandiae is a species of agaric fungus in the family Hymenogastraceae. The species is known from the Auckland Region of New Zealand, where it grows from clay soils in exotic pine plantations and native forests. It is phylogenetically similar to or almost the same as Psilocybe zapotecorum from Mexico and South America. As a blueing member of the genus Psilocybe it contains the psychoactive compounds psilocin and psilocybin.

== Taxonomy ==
Psilocybe aucklandiae was officially described in 1991 by Gastón Guzmán, Chris King and Victor Bandala in 'A new species of Psilocybe of section Zapotecorum from New Zealand.' The name is feminine; the original orthography is aucklandii which has a masculine suffix. The holotype is in New Zealand with accession PDD 57236 and was collected in the Waitakere Ranges while the isotype is in XAL, Mexico. The fungus is named for its limited geographic distribution, being almost entirely restricted to the Auckland Region, which includes the country's largest city of Auckland and is situated in the upper half of the North Island. At the time of publication it was known only from this area.

Psilocybe aucklandiae
- Mycological characteristics
- Gills on hymenium
- Cap is conical or umbonate
- Hymenium is adnate
- Stipe is bare
- Spore print is purple-brown
- Ecology is saprotrophic
- Edibility is psychoactive

== Description ==
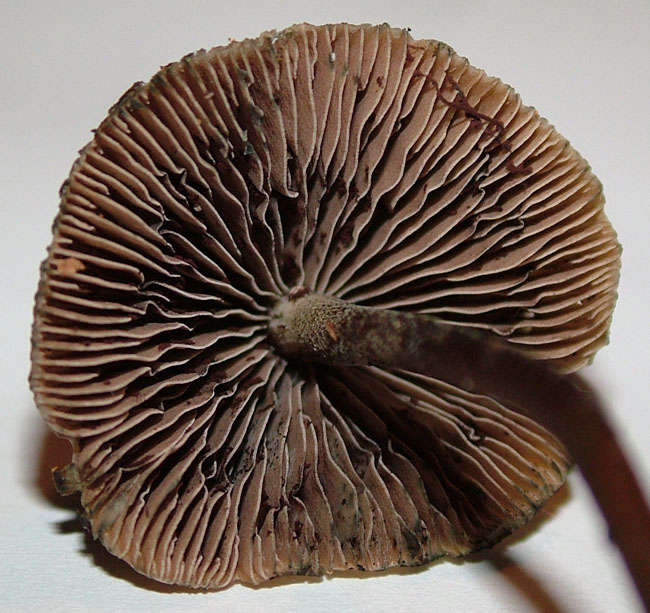
P. aucklandiae: gills.

The cap is 15–55 mm diam., broadly conic, expanding to broadly umbonate to more or less flattened, with edges becoming slightly upturned and often splitting; dry; lacking veil remnants; dark brown to yellow-brown, striate (radially lined) to edge, hygrophanous, drying to pale yellow-brown to straw-coloured; staining greenish-blue with damage or age; flesh white. The gills are adnate (broadly attached to the stem), close, greyish yellow-brown, maturing dark violaceous, with a conspicuous pale narrow margin. The stipe is 35-100 x 1.5–5 mm, cylindric, finely pruinose in the upper part and silky-fibrillose near the base, white, yellow or pinkish purple brown, with brownish flesh. Veil cortinoid and poorly developed, disappearing as caps mature. All parts staining deep greenish-blue or blackish-blue with damage. Spore print violet brown.

Spores measure (6.5-)7-9.5 x 4–5.5 x 3.5-4.5 μm, 8.1 x 4.9 x 4.3 μm average, ovate in face view, elliptic-ovate in side view; brown-walled and smooth, 0.5 μm thick with apical pore; Basidia 20-28 x 4.5-6 μm, cylindric, with 4 spores, clamped; Cheilocystidia 15-32 x 4-8 μm, ventricose-rostrate (swollen and uneven with a beak), with long, tapering, flexuous and sometimes bifurcate neck (forked in two), transparent, thin-walled, up to 12 μm long; Pleurocystidia 13-19 x 4.5-6 μm, scattered, similar to cheilocystidia but with shorter neck, up to 4.5 μm.

=== Similar species ===
Psilocybe zapotecorum in Mexico and South America, as noted by Guzman et al. (1991), "P. aucklandii is very similar to P. zapotecorum R. Heim emend. Guzman, which is common in Mexico and known from South America. The two species are barely distinguishable microscopically, although comparison with published descriptions (Guzman 1983) show that P. aucklandii may have slightly narrower pleurocystidia and slightly wider spores. Published illustrations of P. zapotecorum (Guzman 1983) appear to show that P. aucklandii is a less robust species."

== Distribution and habitat ==
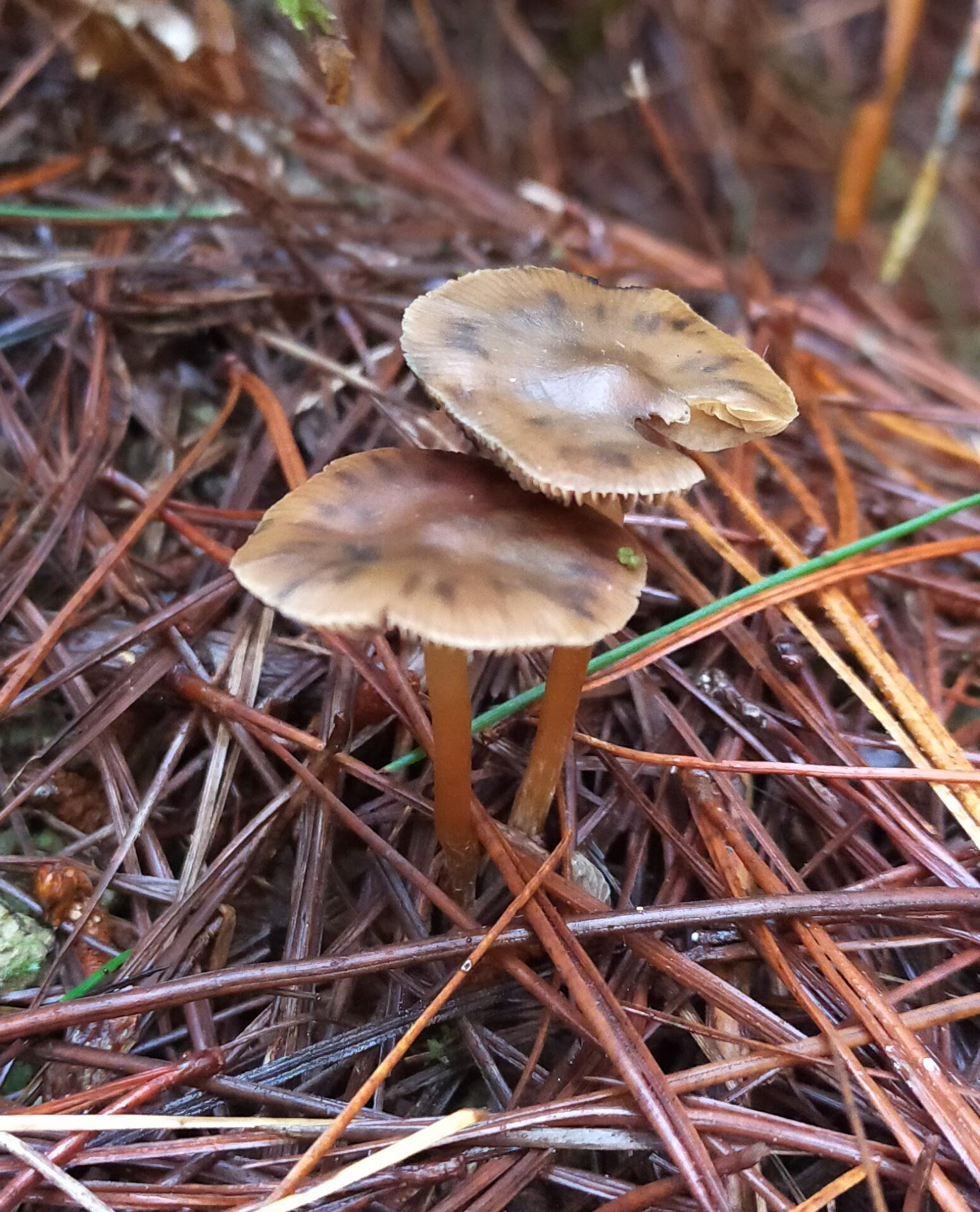

On soil and litter, especially clay soils, in native forests and pine plantations, almost always in the wider Auckland Region. Commonly found in the exotic pine plantation of Riverhead. Has been recorded from Waipoua in Northland, and in Australia as Psilocybe sect. Zapotecorum, which is likely phylogenetically similar or the same.

Specimens examined for the description: Auckland: Woodhill State Forest, on ground in litter of mixed pine and native forest, C. C. King, Jun 1989 PDD 57236 (holotype). Waitakere Ranges: Sharps Bush, in litter under Leptospermum and Dacrydium: PDD 43043; Atkinson Park, Titirangi Beach on soil under Leptospermum: PDD 49789; Quarry Track, Piha Valley Forest, on litter: PDD 58423. Hunua Ranges: Orere, on ground: PDD 34593; Mangatangi Valley, on rotten wood: PDD 34594.

== See also ==
- List of psilocybin mushrooms
