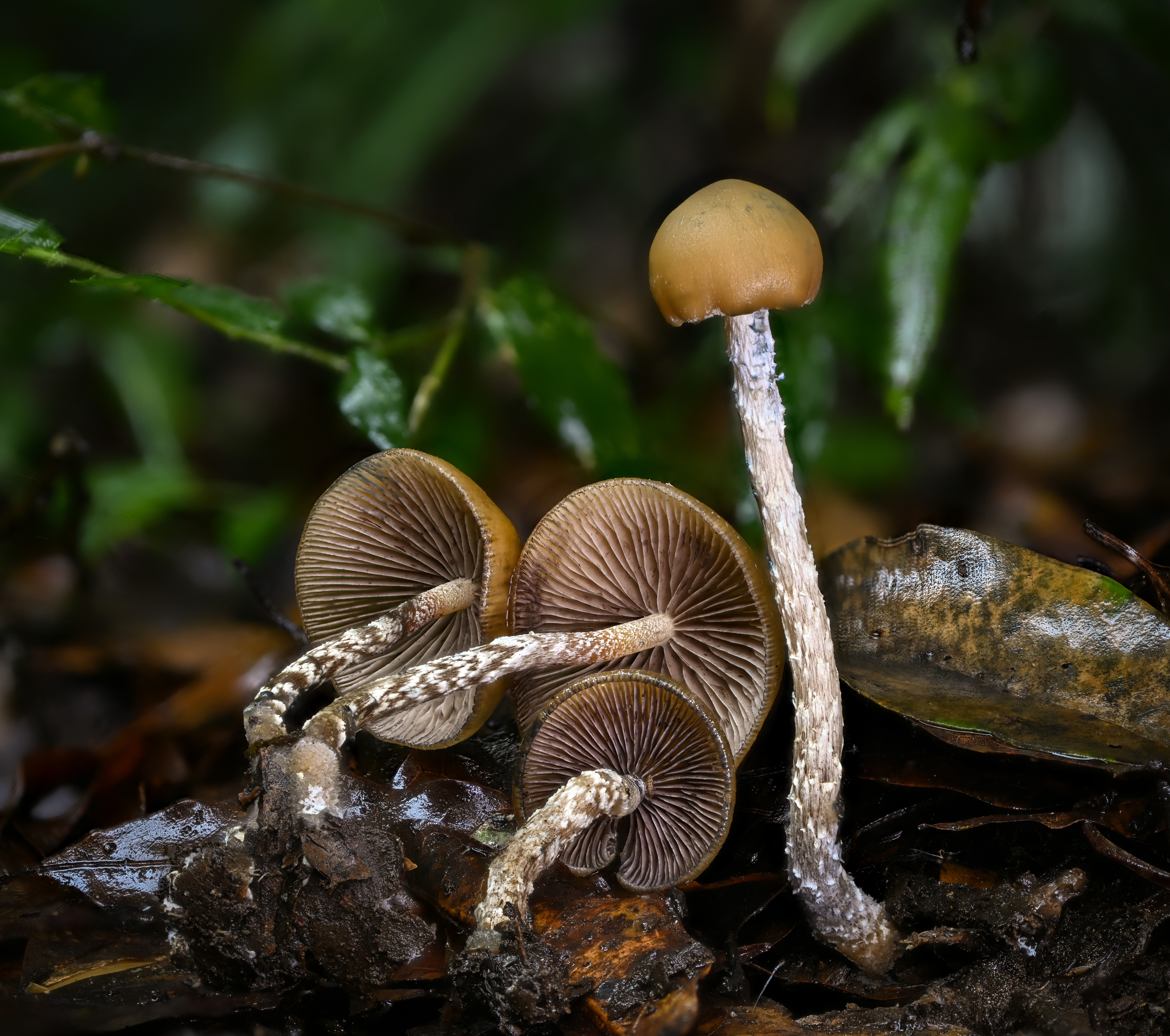

Scientific classification
- Kingdom: Fungi
- Division: Basidiomycota
- Class: Agaricomycetes
- Order: Agaricales
- Family: Hymenogastraceae
- Genus: Psilocybe
- Species: P. zapotecorum

Binomial name
- Psilocybe zapotecorum Heim emend Guzman

Synonyms
- Psilocybe candidipes Singer & A.H. Sm. (1958); Psilocybe aggericola Singer & A.H. Sm. (1958); Psilocybe aggericola var. alvaradoi Singer & A.H. Sm. (1958); Psilocybe zapotecorum f. elongata R. Heim (1966); Psilocybe bolivarii Guzmán (1968); Psilocybe barrerae Cifuentes & Guzmán (1981); Psilocybe sanctorum Guzmán (1982); Psilocybe microcystidiata Guzmán & Bononi (1984); Psilocybe zapotecorum var. ramulosum Guzmán & Bononi (1984); Psilocybe zapotecorum var. ramulosa Guzmán & Bononi (1984); Psilocybe ramulosa Guzmán & Bononi (1995); Psilocybe subzapotecorum Guzmán (2000); Psilocybe pseudozapotecorum Guzmán (2000); Psilocybe chaconii Guzmán, Escalona & Ram.-Guill. (2004)

= Psilocybe zapotecorum =

Species of fungus

Psilocybe zapotecorum
- Mycological characteristics
- Gills on hymenium
- Cap is conical or convex
- Hymenium is adnate or sinuate
- Stipe is bare
- Spore print is purple-brown
- Ecology is saprotrophic
- Edibility is psychoactive

Psilocybe zapotecorum is a psilocybin mushroom which has psilocybin and psilocin as main active compounds. It is in the section Zapotecorum.

== Etymology and history ==
It is named for the Zapotec Natives, who are native to the Sierra Madre mountains of Oaxaca Mexico, as well as the area they inhabited. According to Richard E. Schultes the Zapotec name translates as "Crown of thorns mushroom". Other sources give the Zapotec name as badao zoo translated as "hongo borracho", "drunken mushroom".

- 1956: Holotype collected August 4, 1956 in Santiago Yaitepec by Roger Heim and R. Gordon Wasson.
- 1957: Roger Heim and R. Gordon Wasson describe Magic Mushrooms with illustrations in "Magic Mushrooms" LIFE Magazine May 13, 1957.
- 1958-9: Roger Heim published the first scientific description of this fungus. Albert Hofmann also finds Psilocybin.
- 1963: Roger Heim describes this mushroom in the work "Les Champignons Toxiques et Hallucinogènes."
- 1976: Jonathan Ott and Gaston Guzman publish again about the fungus, but describe it as Psilocybe candidipes.

== Description ==
Psilocybe zapotecorum has a farinaceous and raphanoid smell and taste.

=== Cap ===
The cap is 2–13 cm, conical to convex, and very rarely expanding to plane in age. The margin wavy sometimes with an acute papilla or mamilla, usually umbonate or with a depressed center. In young specimens the margin has a scalloped edge which sometimes curls upwards as the mushroom matures. The cap is yellowish brown to tan, fading to cream-yellow then brown and finally black through age. The flesh is originally white but soon changes to a cyan blue, then quickly to black.

=== Gills ===
Psilocybe zapotecorum gills are a cream color when young and violet brown in age, with an attachment that is sinuate or adnate, and sometimes subdecurrent.

=== Spores ===
The spores are dark violet brown, oblong to subellipsoid to subrhomboid, and thin-walled with a short apiculus and truncate germ pore. They measure (5) 6 - 7 (-8) by (3-) 3.5 - 4.5 (-5) x 3 - 4 μm.

=== Stipe ===
The stipe is 3–26 cm long, and 0.5–1 cm thick. It is central, flexuous, cylindric or slightly flattened, and hollow. It can be white to grey, turning yellowish, blue, and black in age. The entire stem is covered with many white scales which are more pronounced in the lower part of the stipe. The partial veil is white and arachnoid, disappearing in age. Often a long pseudorrhiza can be found attached the base of the stipe. Strongly bruising blue then black where damaged.

== Distribution and habitat ==
Psilocybe zapotecorum grows solitarily or gregariously, sometimes in cespitose clusters of around a 50 mushrooms. It is found near rivers, creeks and ravines, sometimes growing directly from steep mossy ravine walls. Psilocybe zapotecorum is also found in humid and shadowed places in mesophytic forests, oak-and-pine forests, or cloud forests.

Psilocybe zapotecorum is often found in subtropical forests containing Alnus sp., Magnolia sp., Fraxinus sp., Quercus sp., large pines, and blackberry bushes.

Psilocybe zapotecorum grows in Argentina, Brazil, Chile, Colombia, Mexico, Peru, Guatemala, El Salvador, Venezuela, Nicaragua and Ecuador.

== Gallery ==
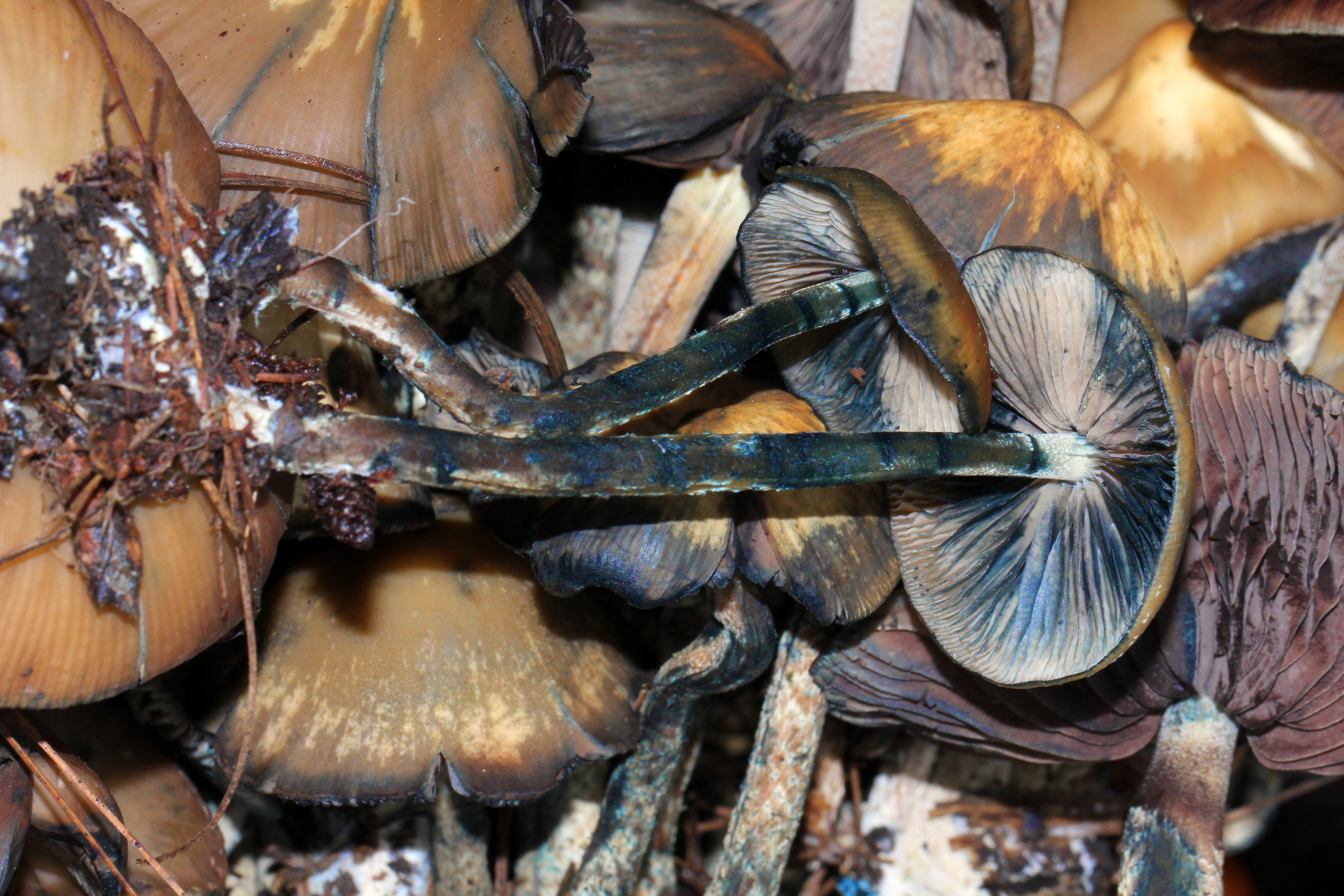
Psilocybe zapotecorum

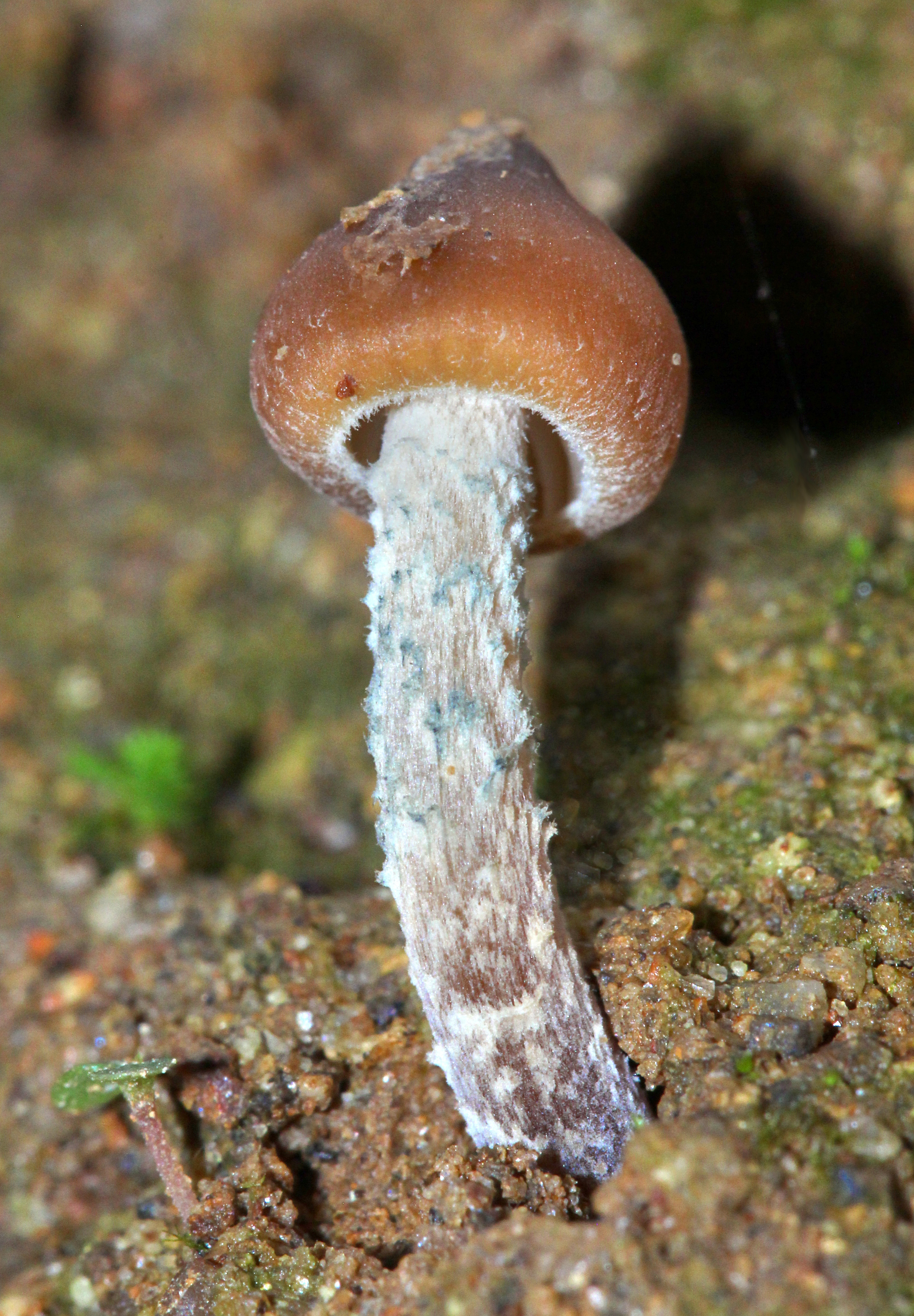
Psilocybe zapotecorum

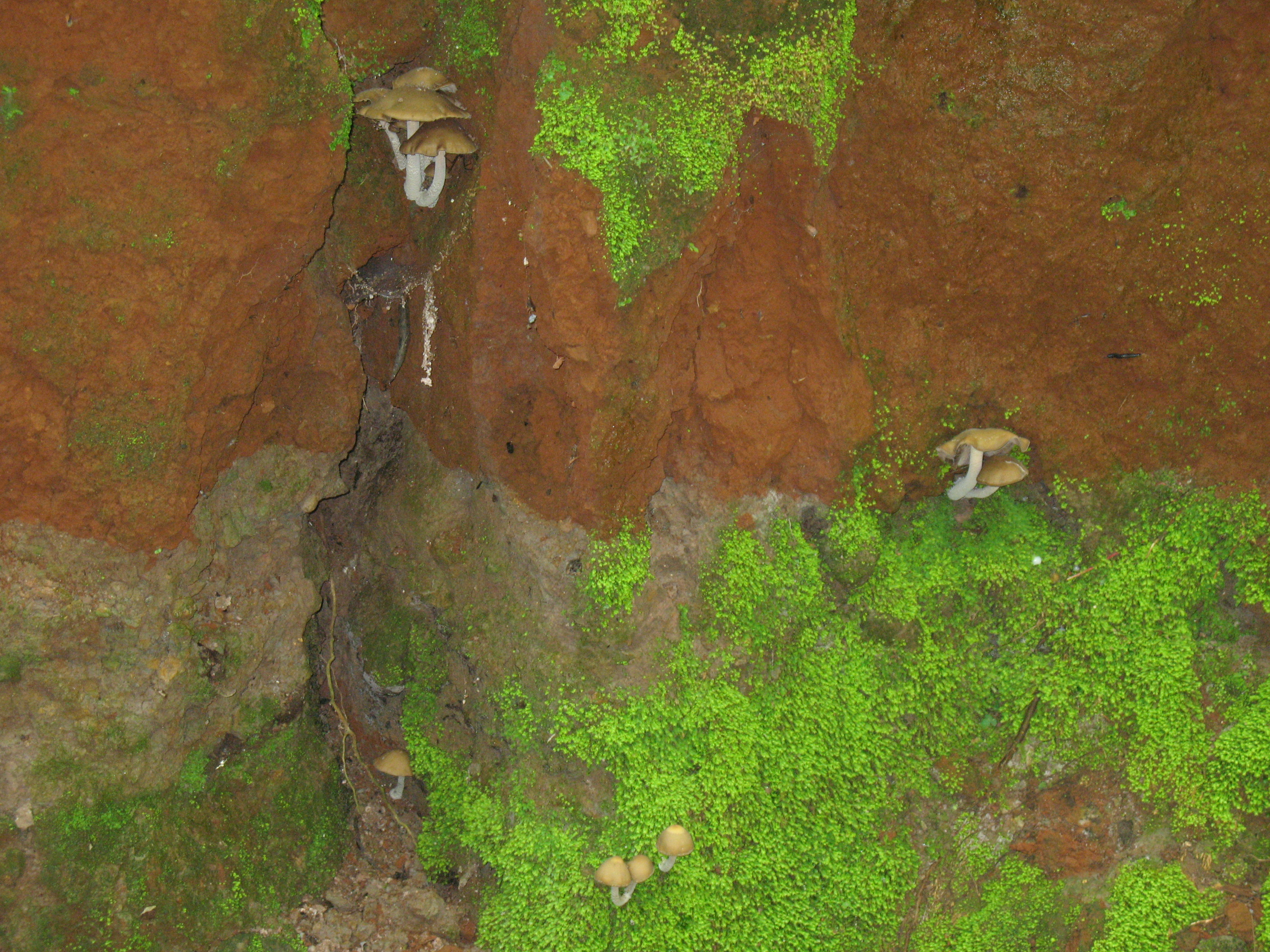
Psilocybe zapotecorum

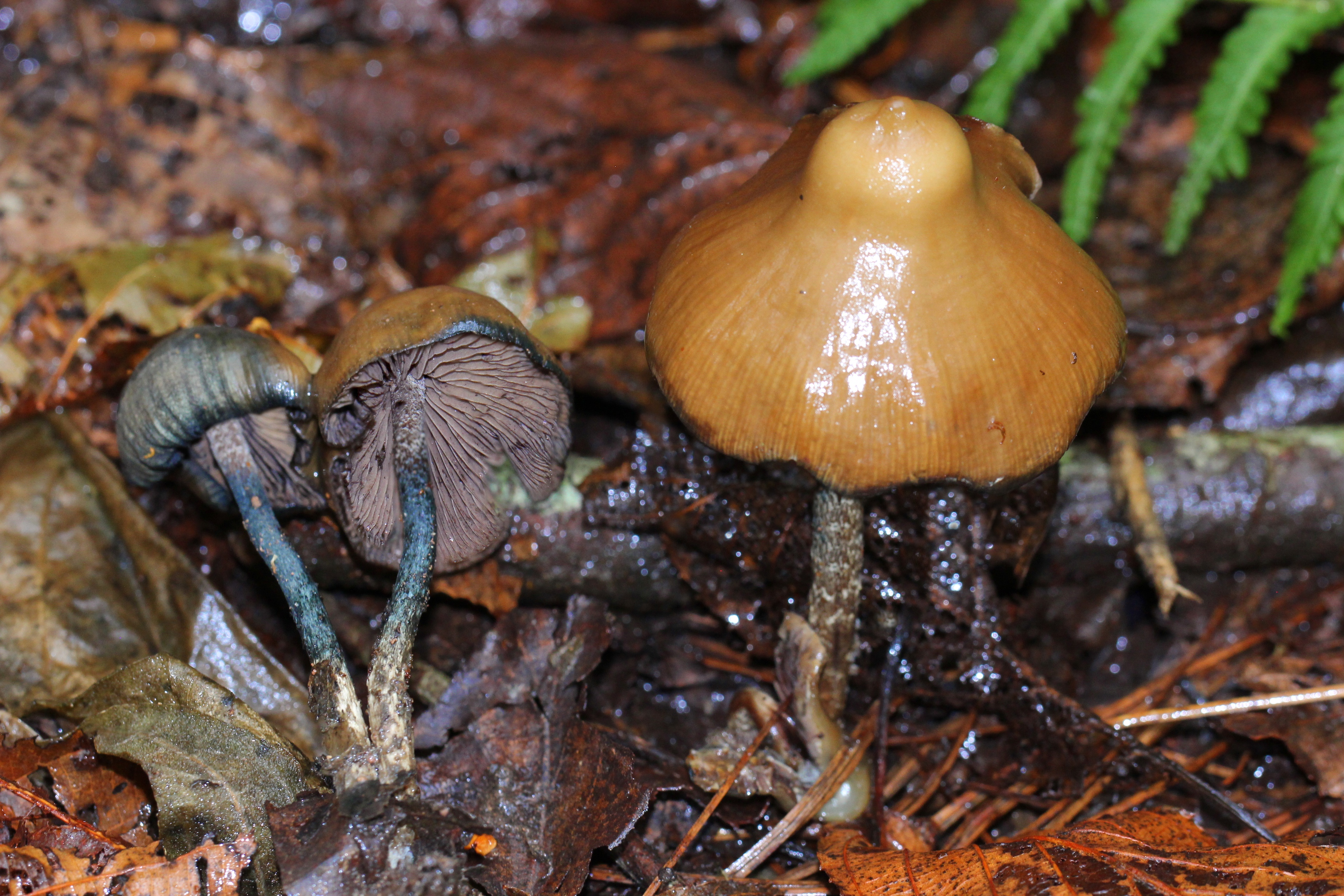
Psilocybe zapotecorum

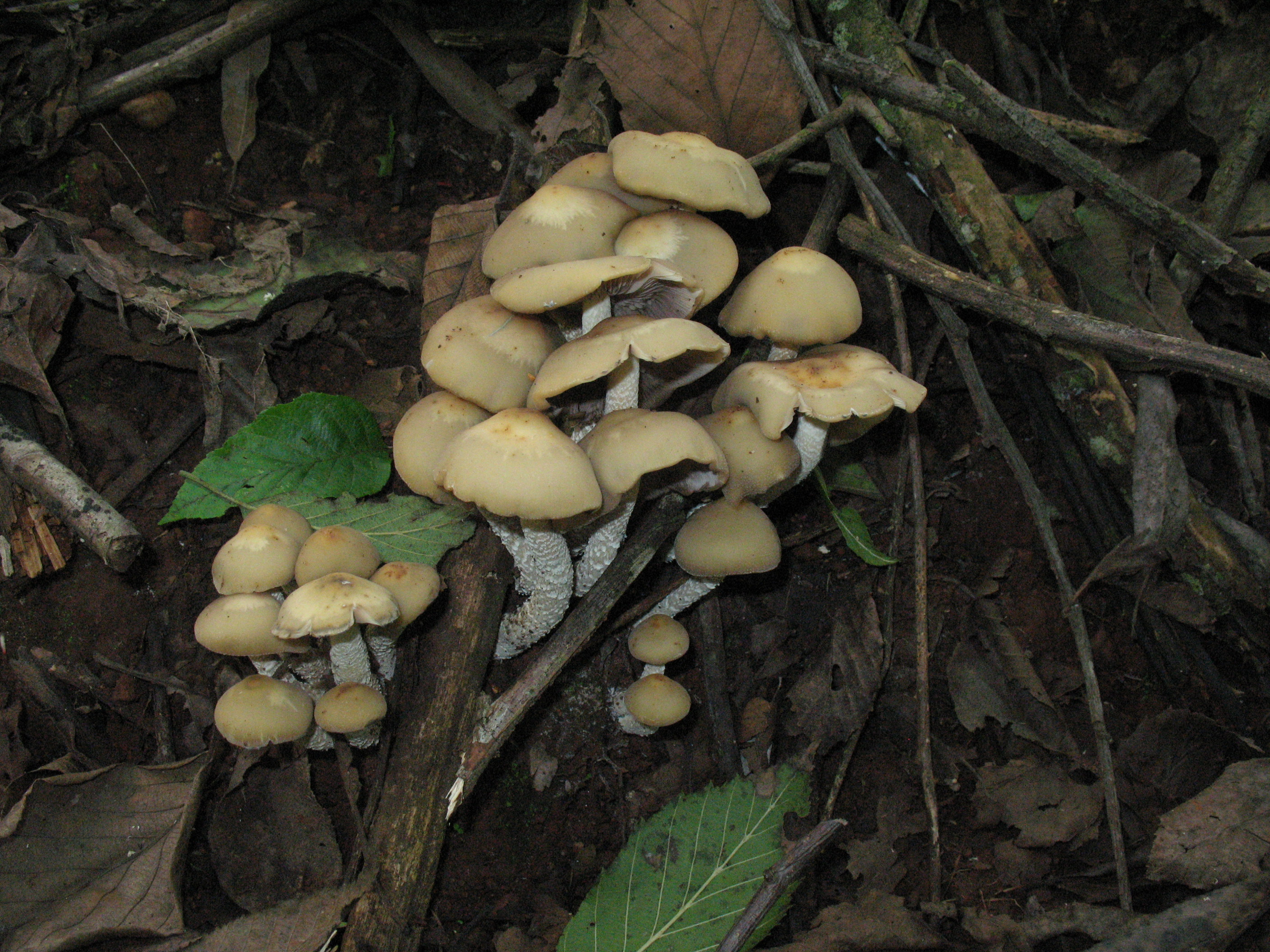
Psilocybe zapotecorum

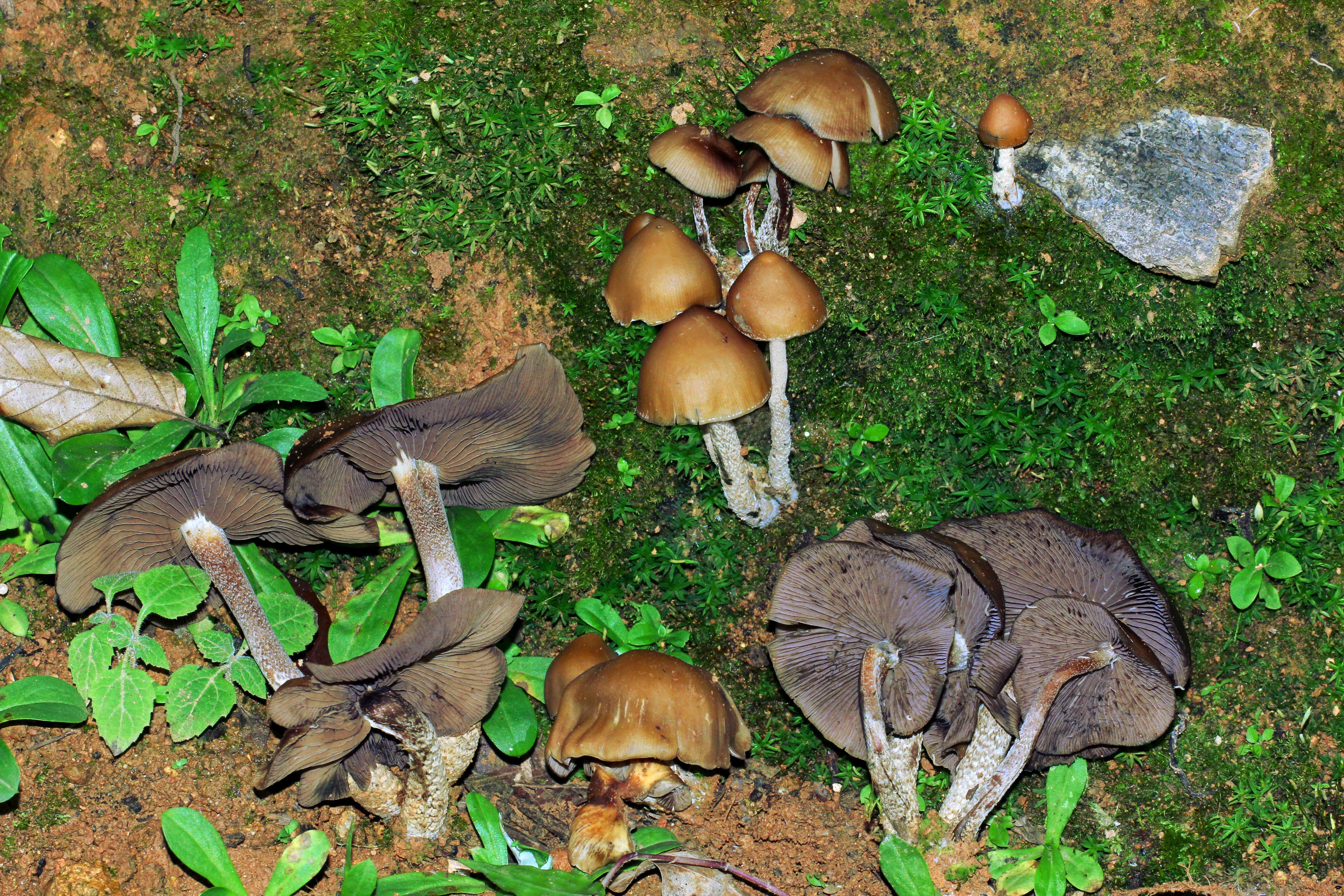
Psilocybe zapotecorum

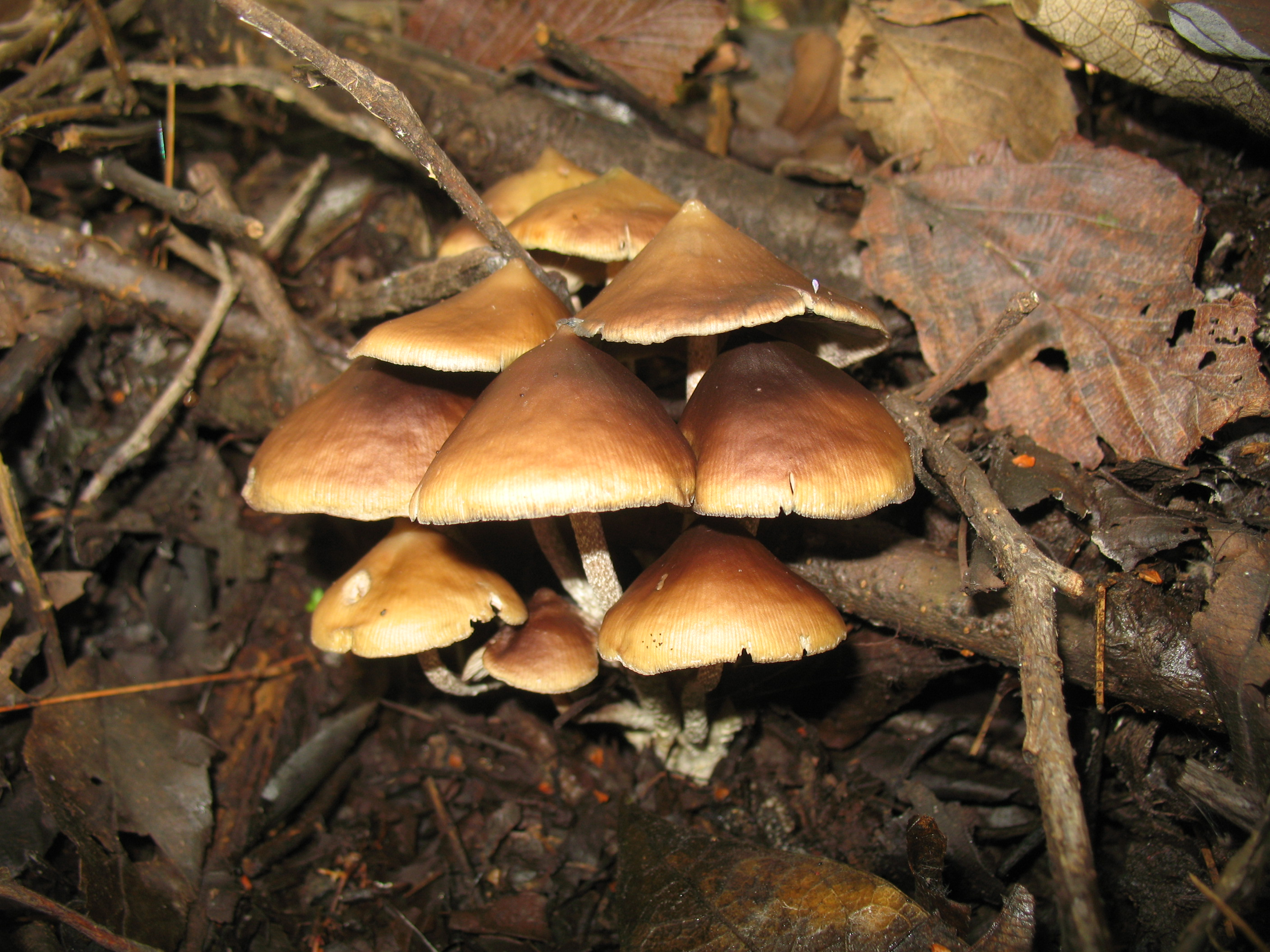
Psilocybe zapotecorum

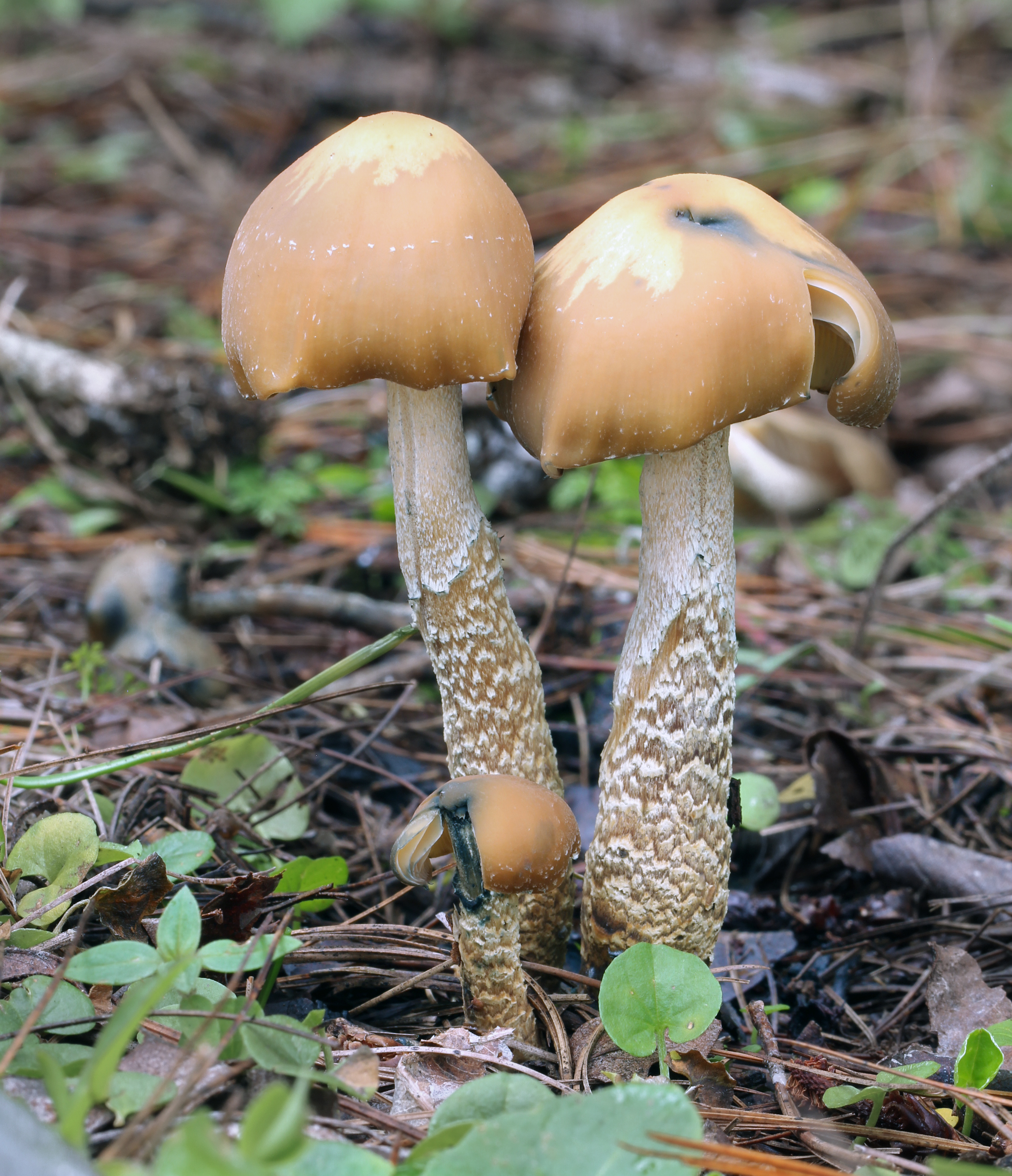
Psilocybe zapotecorum

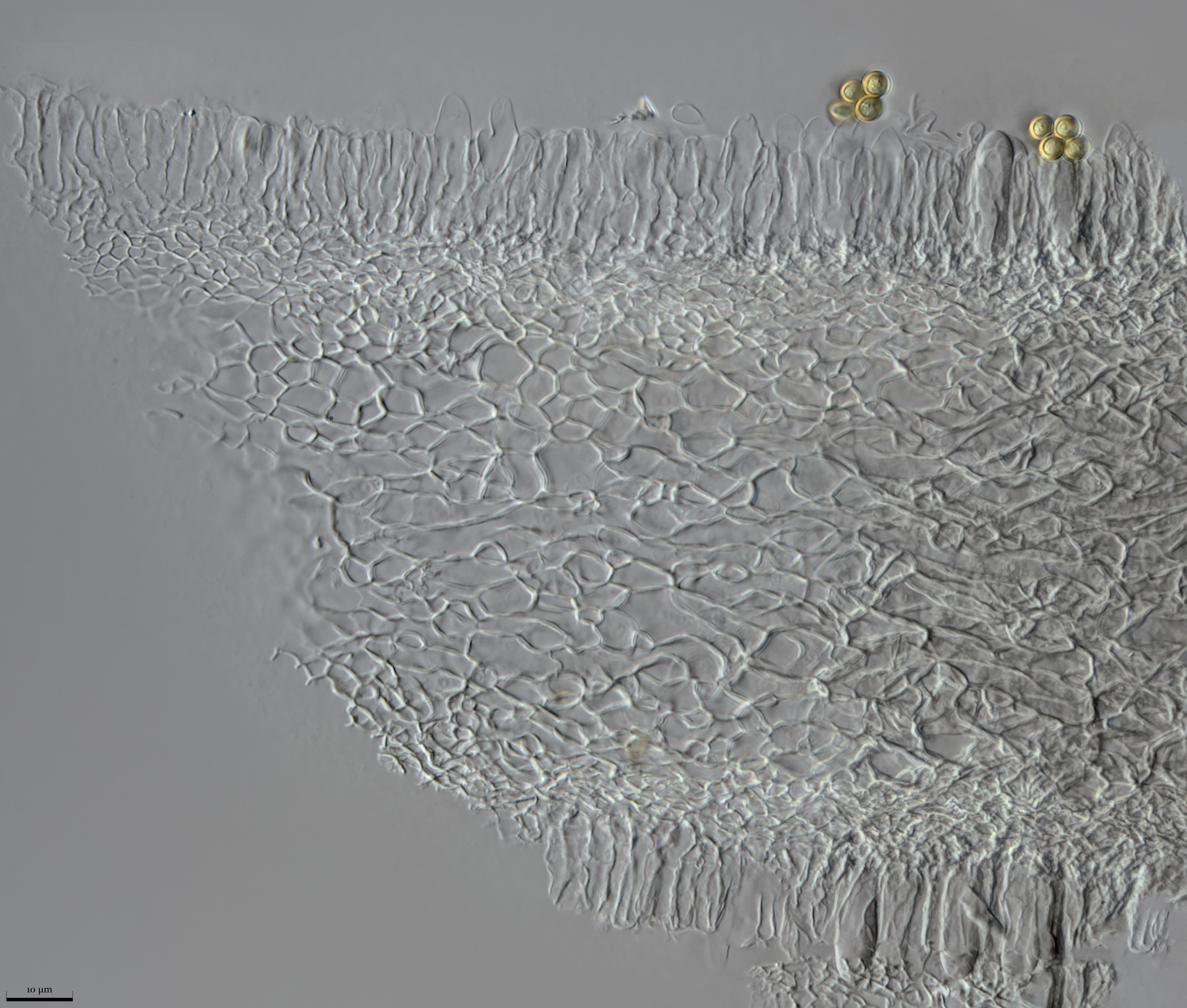
Psilocybe zapotecorum lamellar trama 1000x

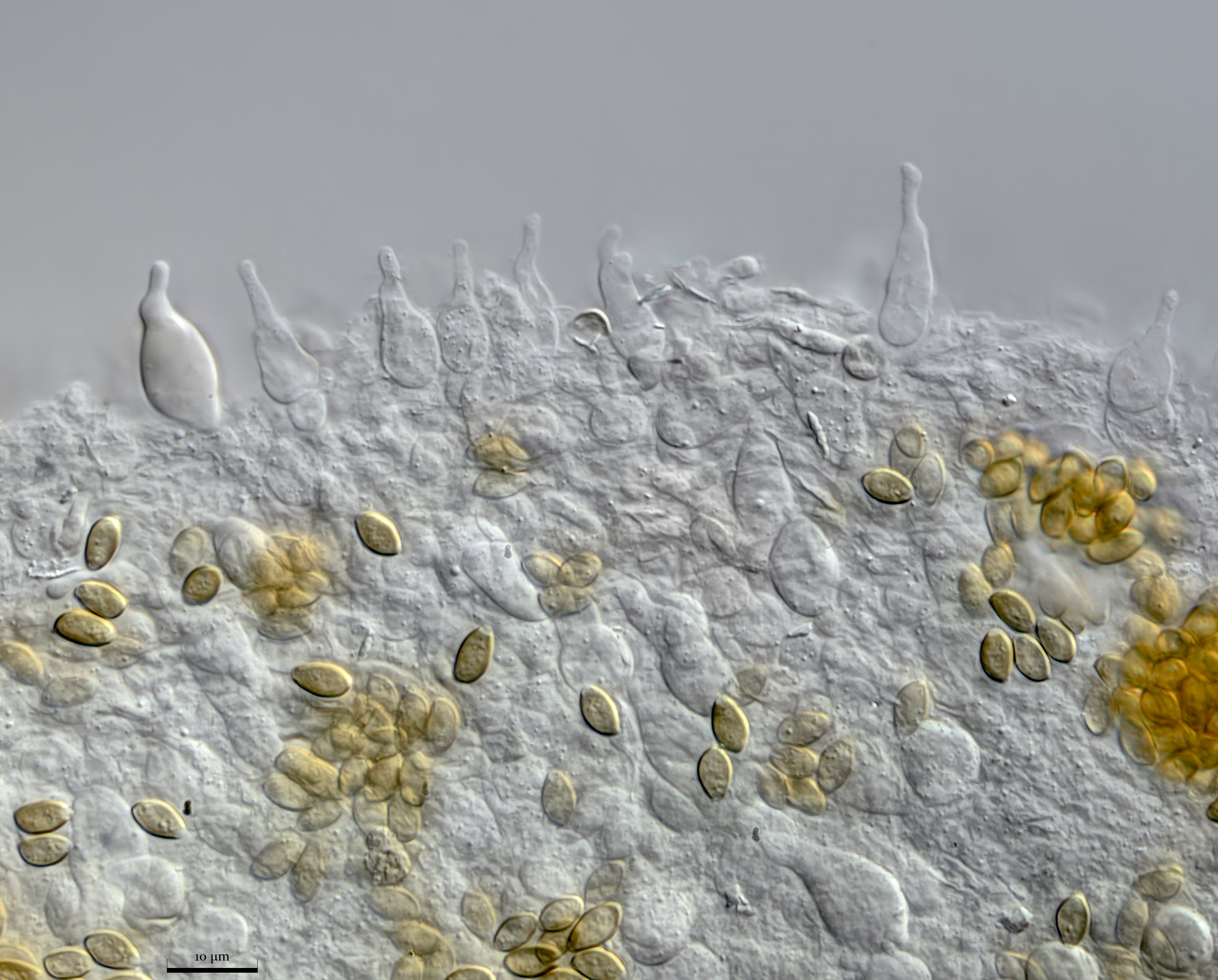
Psilocybe zapotecorum gill edge 1000x

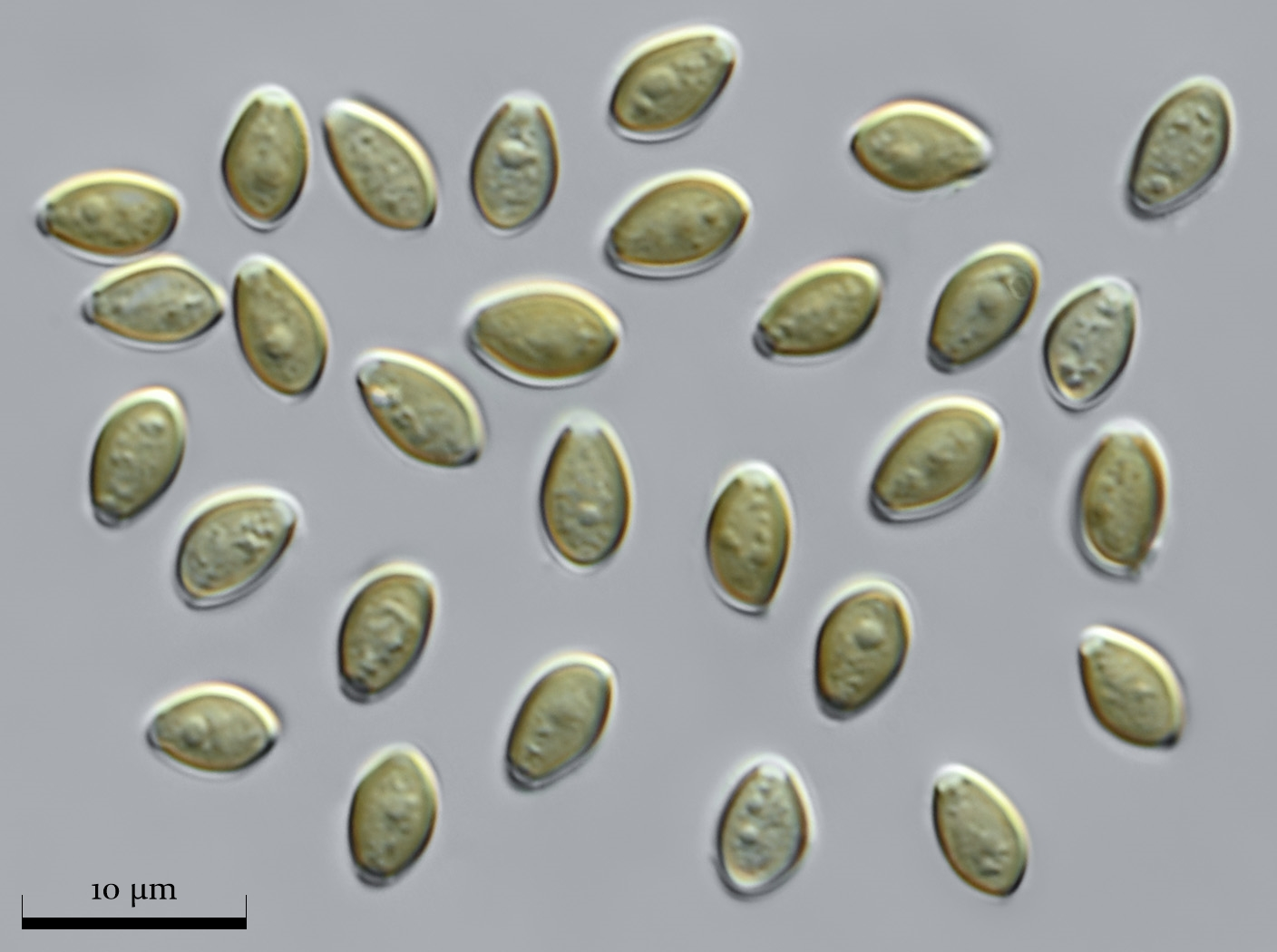
Psilocybe zapotecorum spores 1000x
