= List of Inocybe species =

Inocybe is a large genus of mushroom-producing fungi in the order Agaricales. The genus is widely distributed in the Northern Hemisphere. As of December 2015, Index Fungorum accepts 848 species in Inocybe. As of 2023, it is estimated that there are 1050 species in this genus.

A B C D E F G H I J K L M N O P Q R S T U V U W X Y Z

== A ==
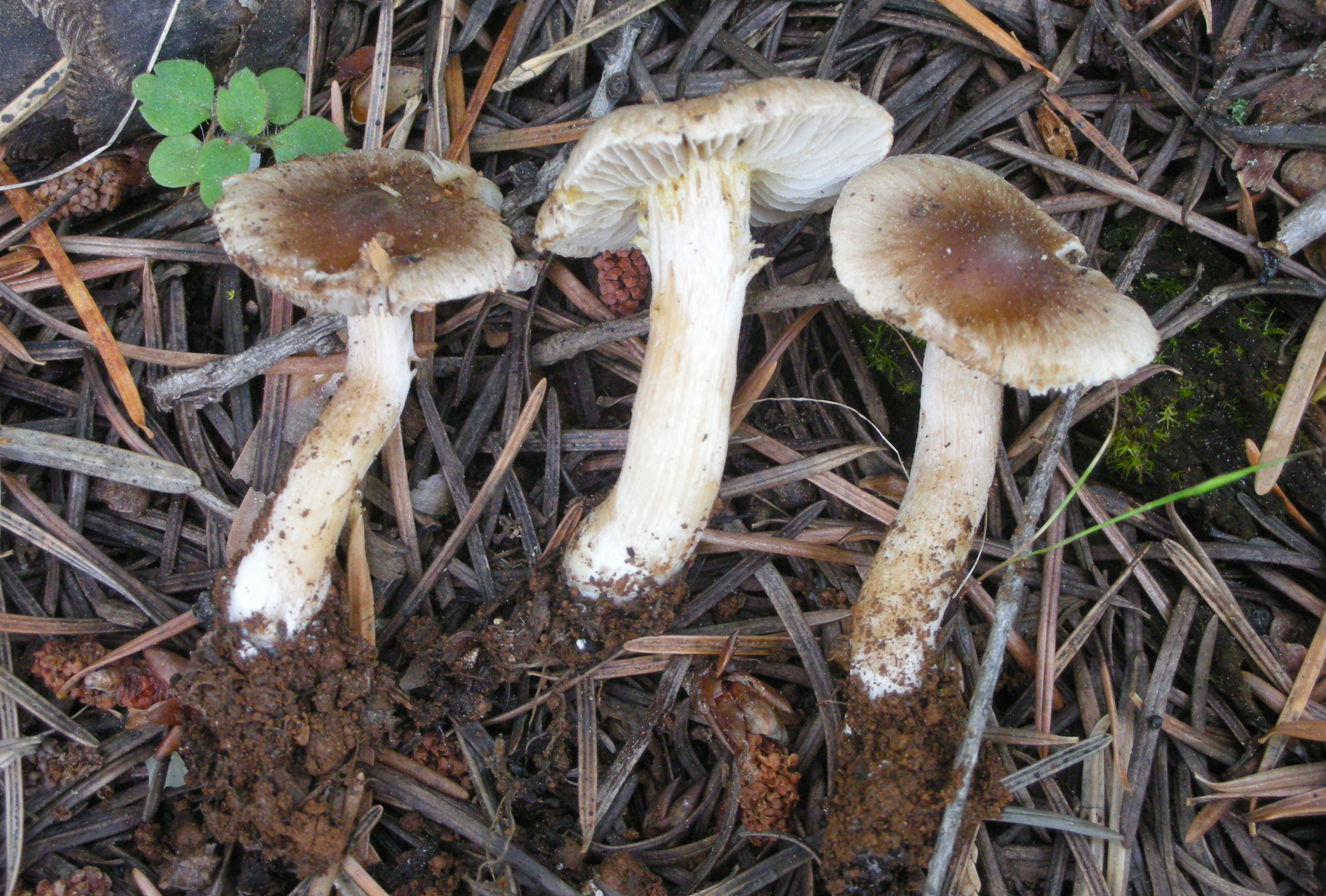
Inocybe abjecta

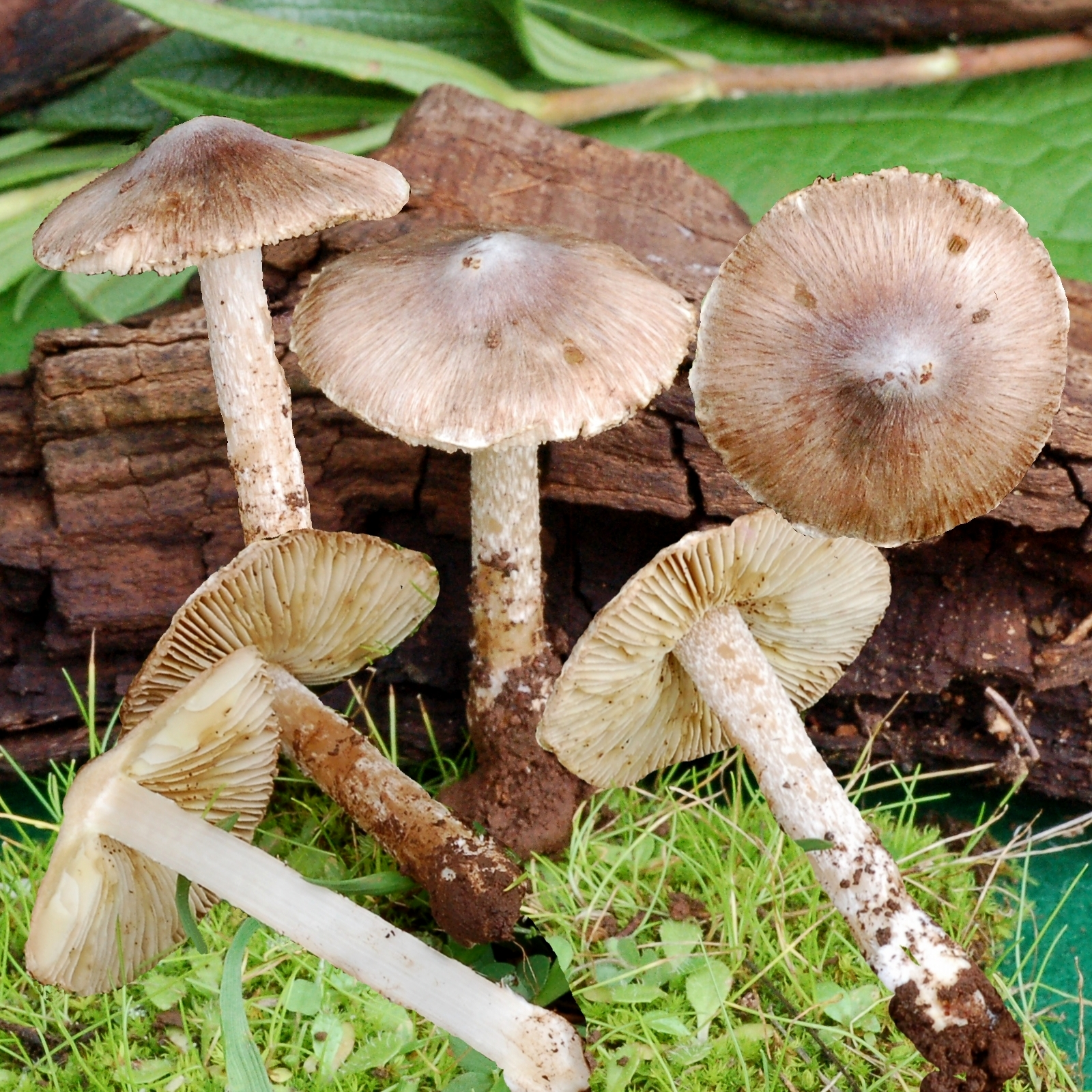
Inocybe arenicola var. mediterranea

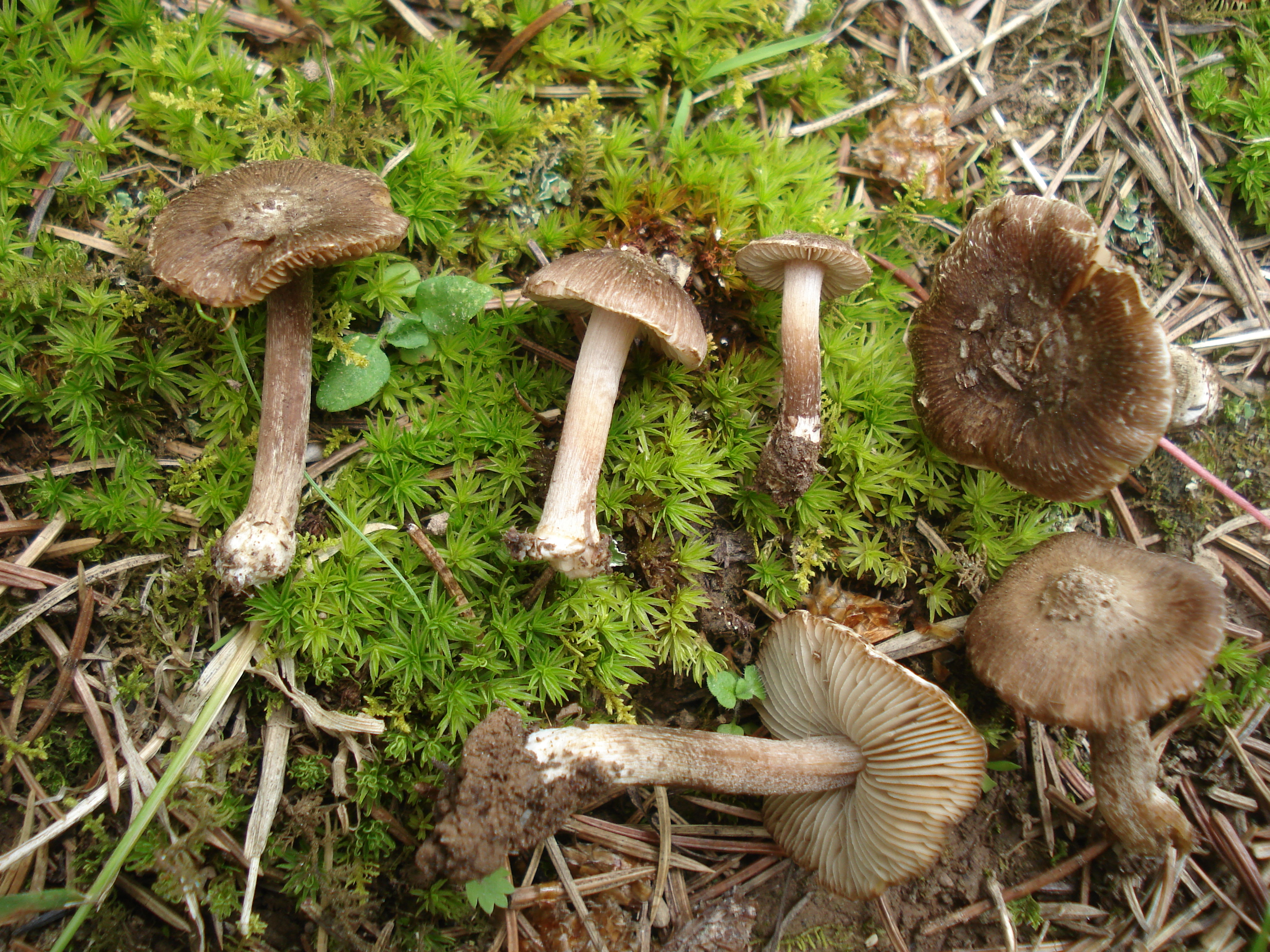
Inocybe assimilata

- Inocybe aberrans (E.Horak) Garrido 1988
- Inocybe abietis Kühner 1953
- Inocybe abnormispora Alessio 1987
- Inocybe abundans Murrill 1911
- Inocybe acriolen Grund & D.E.Stuntz 1975
- Inocybe acuta Boud. 1917
- Inocybe acutata Tak. Kobay. & Nagas. 1993
- Inocybe acutoides Kokkonen & Vauras 2013
- Inocybe acystidiosa Kauffman 1924
- Inocybe adaequata (Britzelm.) Sacc. 1887 – Europe
- Inocybe aeruginascens Babos 1970 (psychoactive)
- Inocybe aestiva Kropp, Matheny & Hutchison 2013 – USA
- Inocybe agardhii (N.Lund) P.D.Orton 1960 – United Kingdom
- Inocybe agglutinata Peck 1888
- Inocybe agordina Bizio 2000
- Inocybe alabamensis Kauffman 1924
- Inocybe alachuana Murrill 1941
- Inocybe albicans Velen. 1920
- Inocybe albidipes Cleland & Cheel 1918
- Inocybe albido-ochracea (Britzelm.) Sacc. & Traverso 1910
- Inocybe albodisca Peck 1898
- Inocybe albofibrillosa Stangl & Schmid-Heckel 1985
- Inocybe albomarginata Velen. 1920 – United Kingdom
- Inocybe alboperonata Kühner 1988
- Inocybe albopruinata Herp. 1912
- Inocybe albovelata Reumaux 1984
- Inocybe albovelutipes Stangl 1980 – United Kingdom
- Inocybe albovestita E.Horak 1978
- Inocybe alboviscida (E.Horak) Garrido 1988
- Inocybe alienospora (Corner & E.Horak) Garrido 1988
- Inocybe alluvionis Stangl & J.Veselský 1976
- Inocybe alnea Stangl 1979
- Inocybe alpigenes (E.Horak) Bon 1997
- Inocybe althoffiae E. Horak 1979
- Inocybe amazoniensis Singer & I.J.A.Aguiar 1983
- Inocybe ambigua Romagn. 1979
- Inocybe amblyospora Kühner 1955
- Inocybe amethystina Kuyper 1986 – United Kingdom
- Inocybe amicta Kokkonen & Vauras 2013
- Inocybe ammophila G.F.Atk. 1918
- Inocybe amoenolens Kühner 1988
- Inocybe ampullaceocystidiata Shchukin 1985
- Inocybe amygdalispora Métrod 1956
- Inocybe amygdalospora Métrod ex Cheype & Contu 2005
- Inocybe angulatosquamulosa Stangl 1984
- Inocybe angustifolia (Corner & E. Horak) Garrido 1988
- Inocybe angustispora Bessette & Fatto 1998
- Inocybe annulata Velen. 1920
- Inocybe antillana Pegler 1983 – Martinique
- Inocybe apiosmota Grund & D.E. Stuntz 1975
- Inocybe appendiculata Kühner 1955 – United Kingdom
- Inocybe arenicola(R.Heim) Bon 1983 – United Kingdom
- Inocybe argentea (Singer) Singer 1931
- Inocybe argenteolutea Vauras 1997
- Inocybe argentina Speg. 1898
- Inocybe argillacea (Pers.) Singer 1961
- Inocybe armeniaca Huijsman 1974
- Inocybe armoricana R.Heim 1931
- Inocybe arthrocystis Kühner 1988
- Inocybe assimilata Britzelm. 1881 – United Kingdom
- Inocybe asterospora Quél. 1880 – Europe
- Inocybe astoriana Murrill 1911
- Inocybe atroumbonata Hongo 1966
- Inocybe aurantiifolia Beller 1979
- Inocybe aurantiobrunnea Esteve-Rav. & García Blanco 2003
- Inocybe aurantiocystidiata E.Turnbull & Watling 1995
- Inocybe aurantioumbonata Franchi & M.Marchetti 2008
- Inocybe aurea Huijsman 1955 – United Kingdom
- Inocybe aureostipes Kobayasi 1952
- Inocybe auricoma (Batsch) Sacc. 1887 – United Kingdom
- Inocybe auricomella Kühner 1988
- Inocybe aurivenia (Batsch) Bres. 1930
- Inocybe australiensis Cleland & Cheel 1918
- Inocybe austrofibrillosa Grgur. 2002
- Inocybe avellanea Kobayasi 1952
- Inocybe avenacea Velen. 1920
- Inocybe ayangannae Matheny, Aime & T.W.Henkel 2003
- Inocybe ayeri Furrer-Ziogas 1987

== B ==
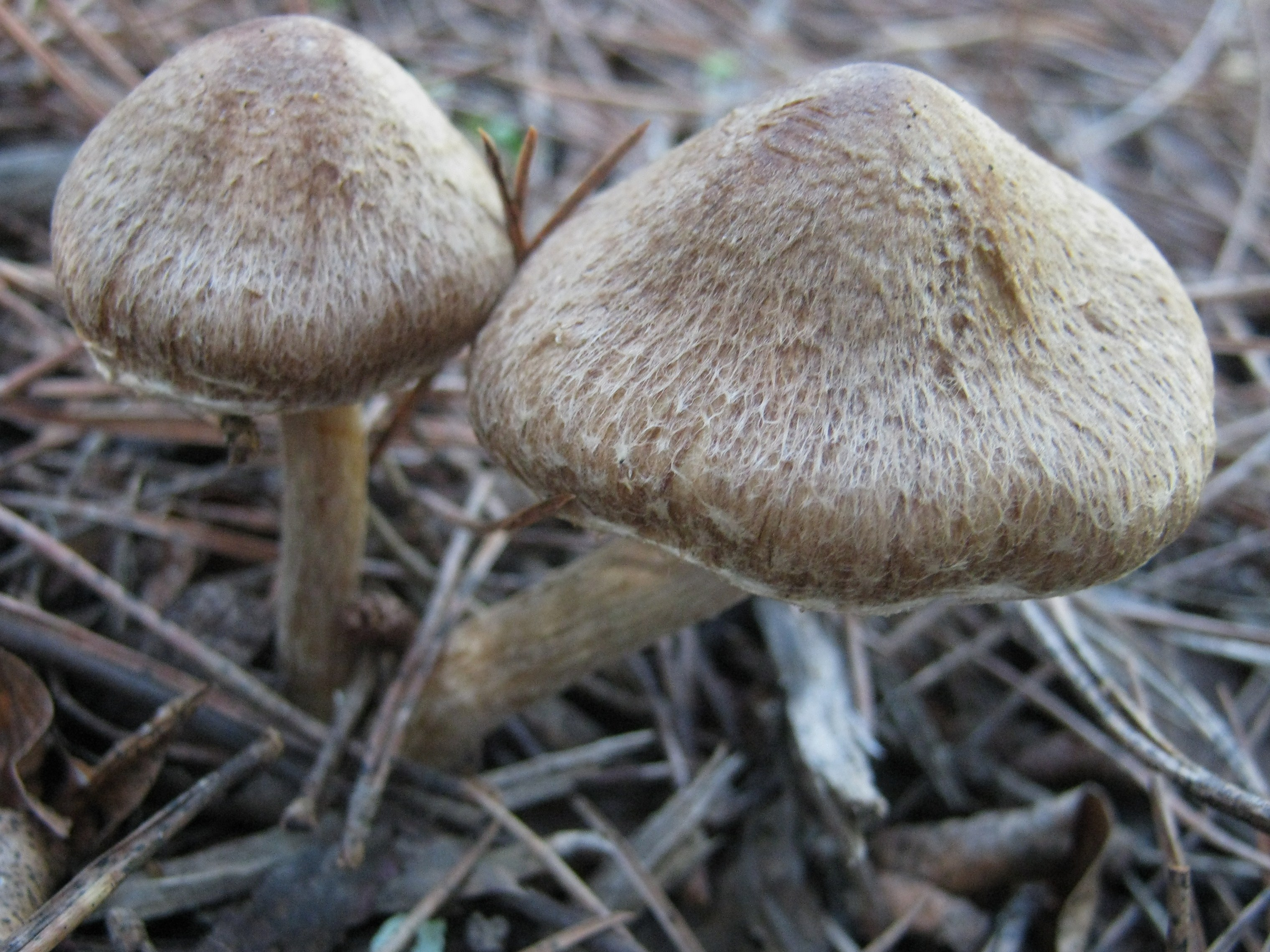
Inocybe bongardii

- Inocybe bakeri Peck 1909
- Inocybe barrasae Esteve-Rav. 2001
- Inocybe basicitrata Jul.Schäff. ex Moënne-Locc. 2000
- Inocybe bipindiensis Henn. 1901
- Inocybe bispora Hongo 1958
- Inocybe bivela Kühner 1988
- Inocybe borealis J.E.Lange 1957
- Inocybe boreocarelica Kokkonen & Vauras 2013
- Inocybe bresadolae Massee 1904 – United Kingdom
- Inocybe bresadolana Bon 1983 – United Kingdom
- Inocybe brevicystis Métrod ex Kuyper 1986
- Inocybe breviterincarnata D.E.Stuntz ex Kropp, Matheny & Hutchison 2013 – USA
- Inocybe bridgesiana Singer 1953
- Inocybe brunnea Quél. 1880
- Inocybe brunneolipes Grund & D.E. Stuntz 1970
- Inocybe brunneotomentosa Huijsman 1978 – United Kingdom
- Inocybe brunneovillosa (Jungh.) Dörfelt & Zschiesch. 1986
- Inocybe brunnescens Earle 1905
- Inocybe bubakii Velen. 1920
- Inocybe bufonia Kokkonen & Vauras 2013
- Inocybe bulbosa Peck 1909
- Inocybe bulbosissima (Kühner) Bon 1992

== C ==
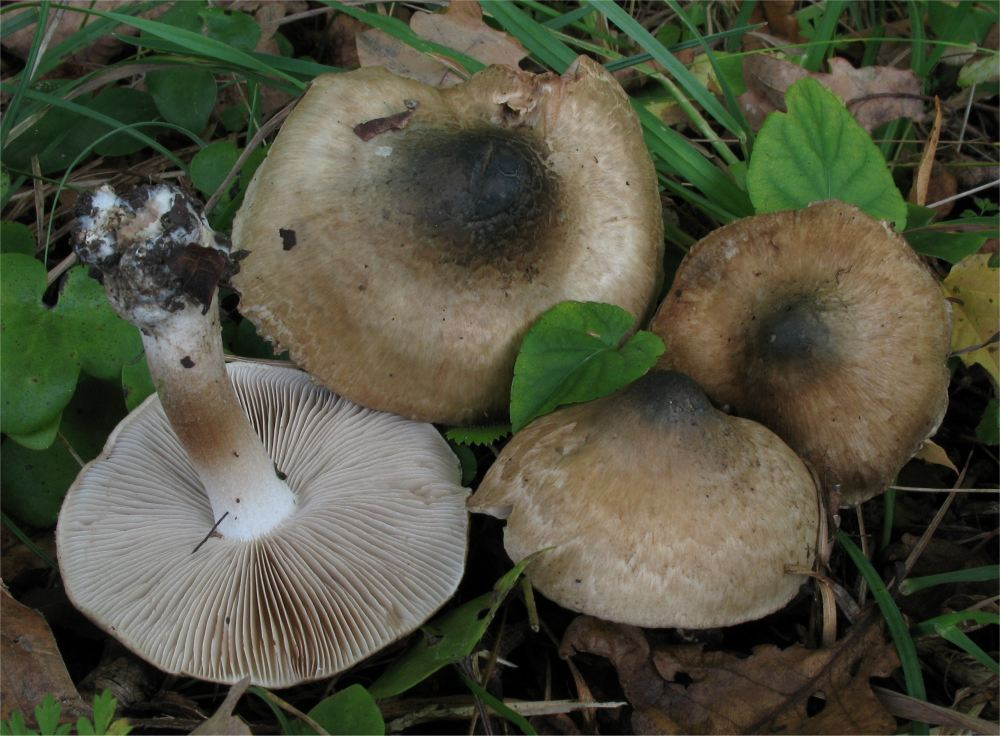
Inocybe corydalina

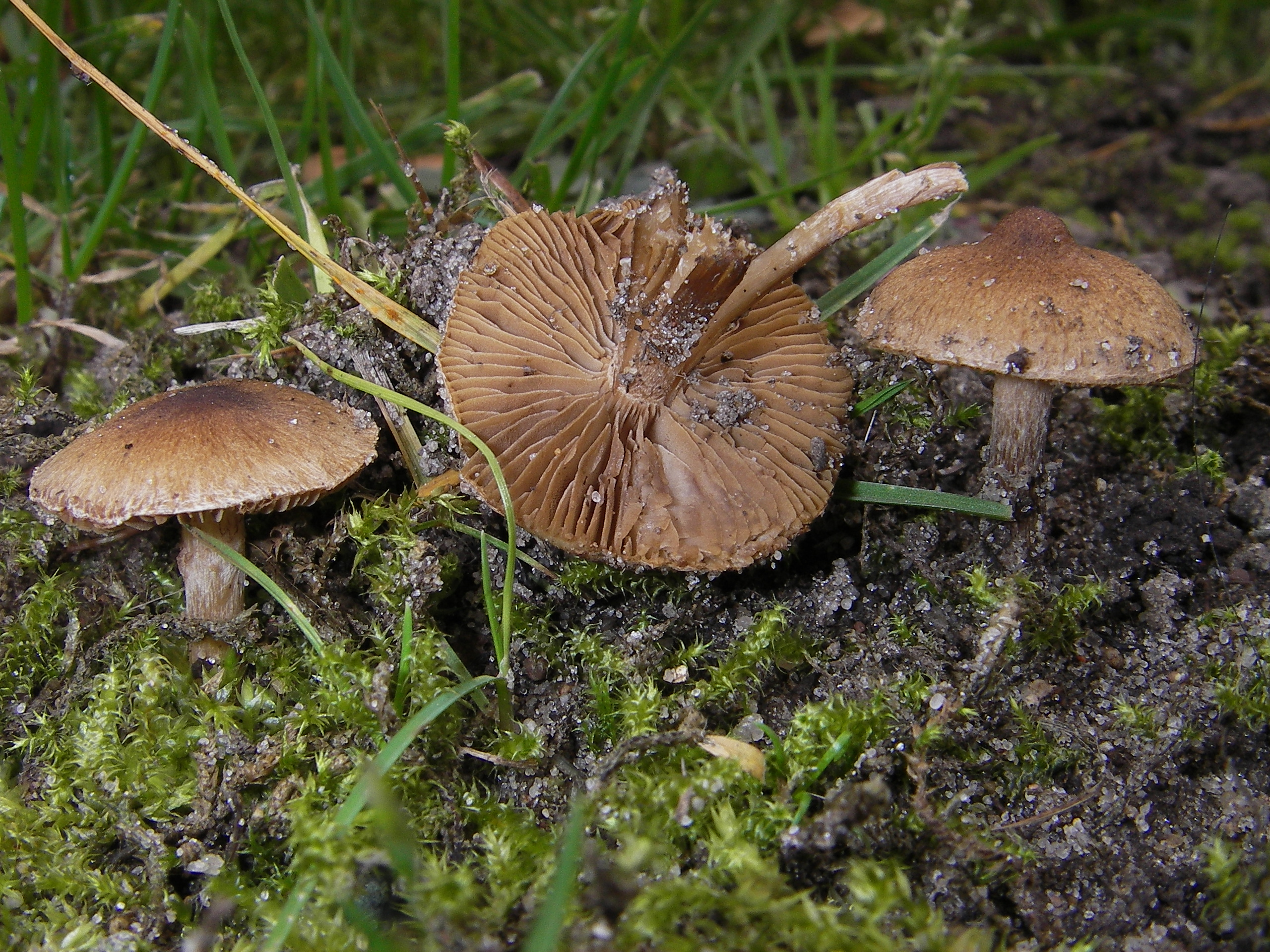
Inocybe curvipes

- Inocybe caballeroi C.E.Hermos. & Esteve-Rav. 2005
- Inocybe caespitosa Velen. 1922
- Inocybe caespitosella Speg. 1926
- Inosperma calamistratoides E. Horak
- Inocybe calcaris Métrod 1953
- Inocybe calida Velen. 1920 – United Kingdom
- Inocybe californica Kauffman 1924
- Inocybe calopedes Matheny & Bougher 2010
- Inocybe calospora Quél. 1881 – Europe
- Inocybe candidipes Kropp & Matheny 2004
- Inocybe canescens J.Favre 1955
- Inocybe carelica Singer 1938
- Inocybe caroticolor – China
- Inocybe carpinacea Velen. 1947
- Inocybe castanea Peck 1904
- Inocybe castaneoides Peck 1913
- Inocybe castanopsis Hruby 193
- Inocybe casuarinae Corner & E. Horak 1979
- Inocybe catalaunica Singer 1947 – United Kingdom
- Inocybe caucasica Singer 1937
- Inocybe cavipes (Britzelm.) Sacc. & Traverso 1910
- Inocybe cerasphora Singer 1953
- Inocybe cercocarpi Kropp, Matheny & Hutchison 2013 – USA
- Inocybe cerea E.Horak 1978
- Inocybe cerina (Malençon) Bon 1996
- Inocybe cervicolor (Pers.) Quél. 1886 – Europe
- Inocybe chalcodoxantha Grund & D.E.Stuntz 1968
- Inocybe chelanensis D.E.Stuntz 1947
- Inocybe chilensis Singer 1965
- Inocybe chondroderma – Pacific Northwest, North America
- Inocybe chondrospora Einhell. & Stangl 1979
- Inocybe chrysocephala F.H.Nishida 1988
- Inocybe chrysochroa Tak. Kobay. & Courtec. 1993
- Inocybe cinchonensis (Murrill) Dennis 1968
- Inocybe cincinnata (Fr.) Quél. 1872 – United Kingdom
- Inocybe cinerascentipes Huijsman 1955
- Inocybe cingulata E.Horak 1979
- Inocybe cingulatipes (Corner & E. Horak) Garrido 1988
- Inocybe cinnabarina Hruby 1930
- Inocybe cinnamomea A.H.Sm. 1941 – Western Cape Province
- Inocybe cinnamomicolor Reumaux 2001
- Inocybe cistobulbipes Esteve-Rav. & Vila 2002
- Inocybe citrinofolia Métrod 1956
- Inocybe clavata Takah. Kobay. 2002
- Inocybe claviger E.Horak & Bas 1981
- Inocybe coelestium Kuyper 1985 (psychoactive)
- Inocybe coerulescens Kobayasi 1952
- Inocybe collivaga Velen. 1920
- Inocybe comatella (Peck) Sacc. 1887
- Inocybe concinnula J.Favre 1955
- Inocybe confusa P.Karst. 1888
- Inocybe congregata A.Pearson 1950 – Western Cape Province
- Inocybe conica P.Larsen 1931
- Inocybe conicoalba E.Horak 1979
- Inocybe connexa Kauffman 1924
- Inocybe conspicuispora Buyck & Eyssart. 1999
- Inocybe copriniformis Reumaux 2005
- Inocybe corcontica Velen. 1920
- Inocybe cordae Velen. 1920
- Inocybe corneri (E.Horak) Garrido 1988
- Inocybe corrubescens Singer 1931
- Inocybe cortinata Rolland 1901
- Inocybe corydalina Quél. 1875 (psychoactive) – Europe
- Inocybe crassicystidiata Pegler 1983 – Martinique
- Inocybe crassipes (Cooke & Massee) Pegler 1965
- Inocybe cryptocystis D.E.Stuntz 1954 – United Kingdom
- Inocybe curreyi (Berk.) Sacc. 1887 – United Kingdom
- Inocybe curvipes P.Karst. 1890 – Africa, Europe
- Inocybe cutifracta Petch 1917 - India, Sri Lanka
- Inocybe cyaneovirescens Henn. 1900
- Inocybe cylindrispora Murrill 1945
- Inocybe cylindrocystis G.F.Atk. 1918
- Inocybe cystidiosa (A.H.Sm.) Singer 1951

== D ==
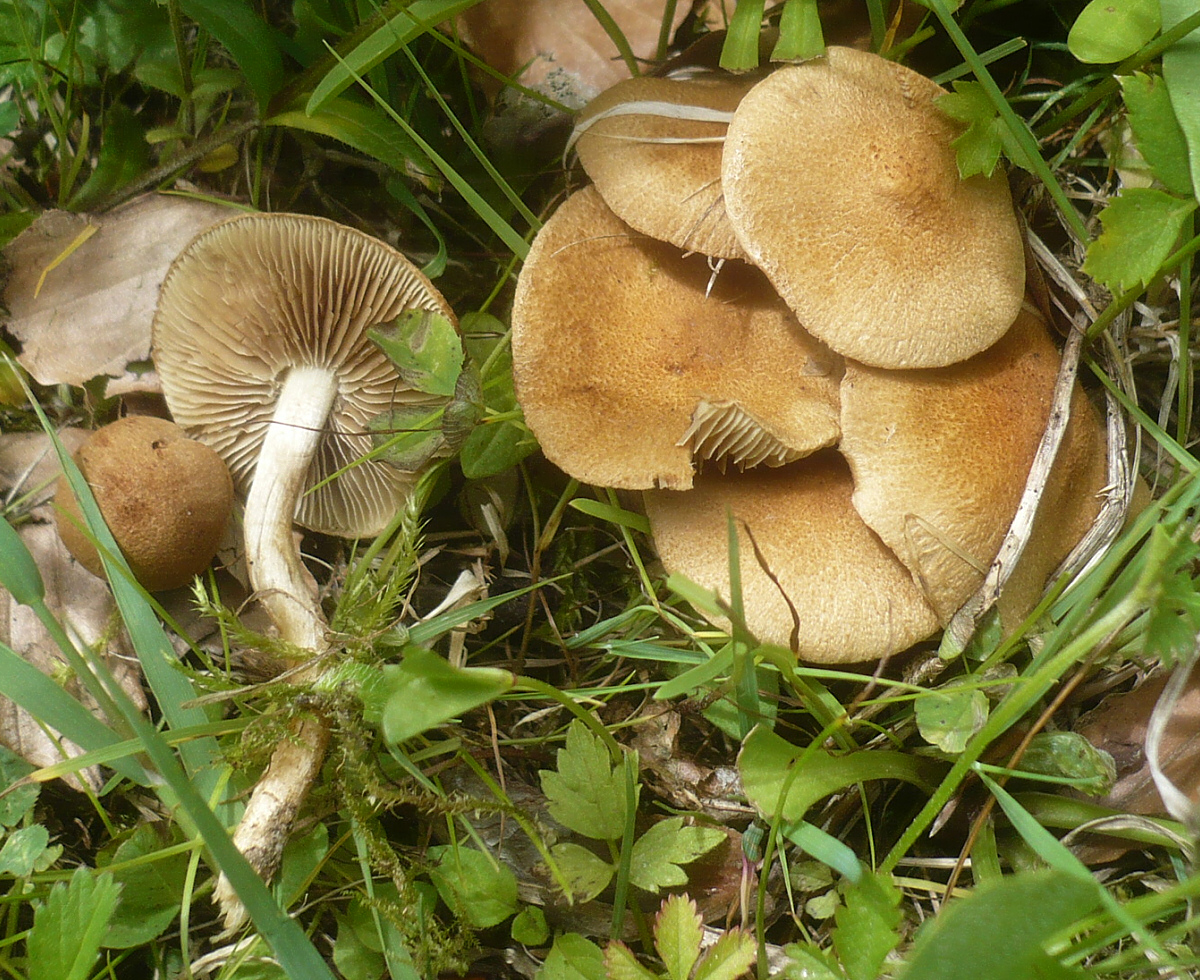
Inocybe dulcamara

- Inocybe davisiana Kauffman 1924
- Inocybe deborae E.Ferrari 2003
- Inocybe decemgibbosa (Kühner) Vauras 1997 – United Kingdom
- Inocybe decipiens Bres. 1892
- Inocybe decipientoides Peck 1907
- Inocybe deianae Eyssart. 2007
- Inocybe deminuta Peck 1906
- Inocybe demitrata Velen. 1920
- Inocybe dentifera Velen. 1947
- Inocybe derbschii Schwöbel & Stangl 1982
- Inocybe desquamans Peck 1906
- Inocybe destruens E.Horak 1978
- Inocybe dewrangia Grgur. 1997
- Inocybe diabolica Vauras 1994
- Inocybe dilutecinnamomea Singer 195
- Inocybe diminuta Peck 1906
- Inocybe dissocystis Singer 1953
- Inocybe distincta Latha, Manim. & Matheny 2016
- Inocybe dolichospora Malençon 1970
- Inocybe dulcamara (Pers.) P.Kumm. 1871
- Inocybe dulcamaroides Kühner 1988
- Inocybe dunensis P.D.Orton 1960 – United Kingdom
- Inocybe duriuscula Rea 1908 – United Kingdom

== E ==
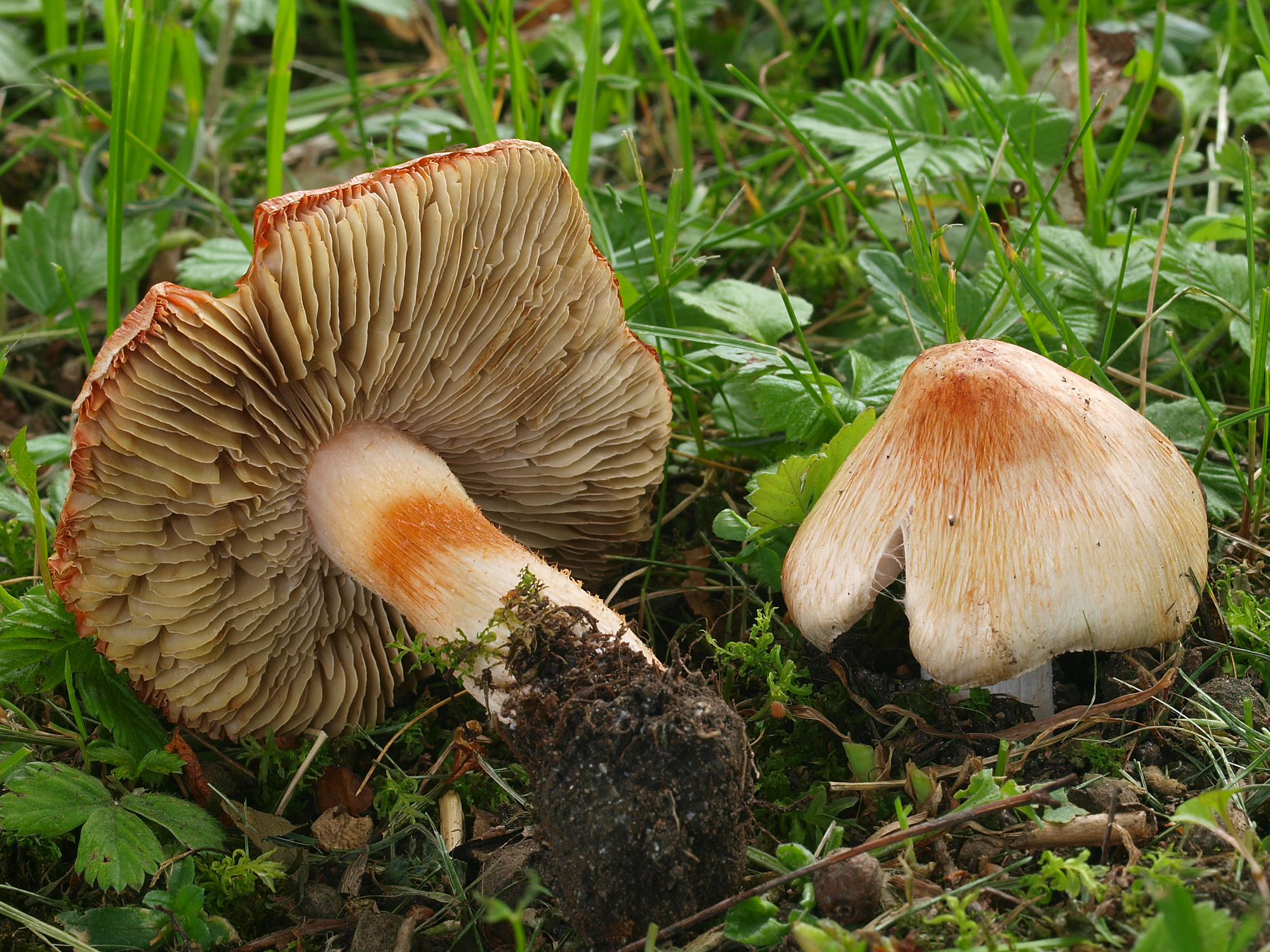
Inocybe erubescens

- Inocybe earleana Kauffman 1924
- Inocybe echinosimilis (E.Horak) Garrido 1988
- Inocybe echinospora Egeland 1913
- Inocybe egenula J.Favre 1955
- Inocybe elegans Reumaux 2001
- Inocybe elliptica Takah.Kobay. 2002
- Inocybe emergens (Cleland) Grgur. 1997
- Inocybe enigmatica Matheny & Aime 2012
- Inocybe epidendron Matheny, Aime & T.W.Henkel 2003
- Inocybe ericetorum Vauras & Kokkonen 2013
- Inocybe erinaceomorpha Stangl & J.Veselský 1979 – United Kingdom
- Inocybe erythospilota Grund & D.E.Stuntz 1984
- Inocybe erythrobasis Singer 1954
- Inocybe eurycystis E.H.L.Krause 1929
- Inocybe euthelella Peck 1915
- Inocybe eutheloides Peck 1887
- Inocybe excoriata Peck 1904
- Inocybe exigua (Cleland) Grgur. 1997
- Inocybe exilis (Kuyper) Jacobsson & E.Larss. 2008

== F ==
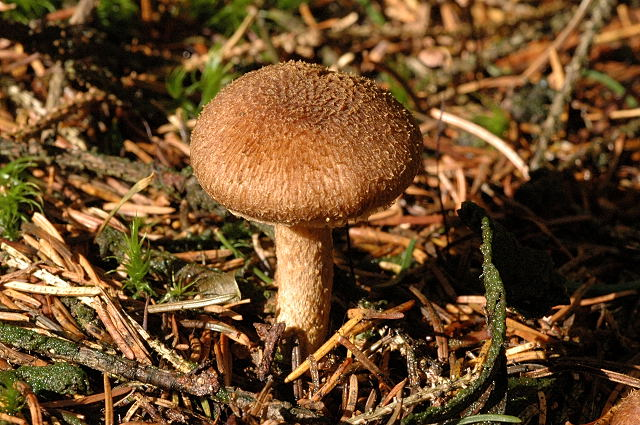
Inocybe flocculosa

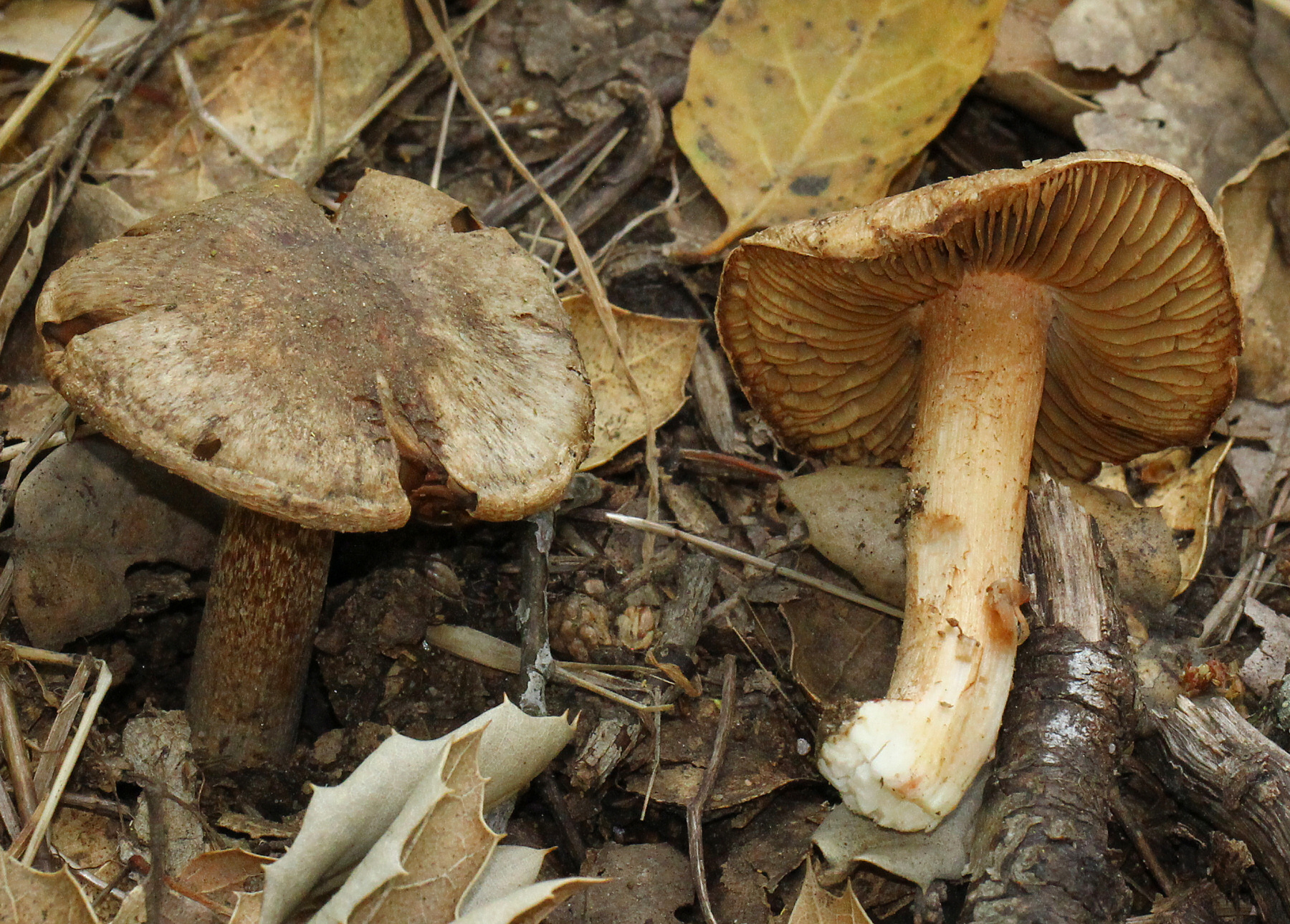
Inocybe fraudans

- Inocybe fallax Peck 1904
- Inocybe fastigiella G.F.Atk. 1918 – United Kingdom
- Inocybe fastuosa Tak.Kobay. 1995
- Inocybe favrei Bon 1985
- Inocybe favrei-cavipes Bon 1997
- Inocybe fechtneri Velen. 1920
- Inocybe felipponei (Speg.) Singer 1951
- Inocybe ferruginea Bon 1978
- Inocybe fibrillosa Peck 1888
- Inocybe fibrillosibrunnea O.K.Mill. & R.N.Hilton 1987
- Inocybe fibrosa (Sowerby) Gillet 1876
- Inocybe fibrosoides Kühner 1933 – United Kingdom
- Inocybe flagellata (Reumaux) Reumaux 2001
- Inocybe flavella P.Karst. 1890 – United Kingdom
- Inocybe flavobrunnea Y.C.Wang 1973
- Inocybe flavobrunnescens
- Inocybe flocculosa Sacc. 1887 – Europe
- Inocybe floridana Murrill 1945
- Inocybe fraudans (Britzelm.) Sacc. 1887 – Europe
- Inocybe frigidula J.Favre 1955
- Inocybe frumentacea (Lam. & DC.) Bres. 1900
- Inocybe fuegiana (Speg.) Speg. 1891
- Inocybe fuligineoatra Huijsman 1955 – United Kingdom
- Inocybe fulvella Bres. 1892
- Inocybe fulvelliceps Murrill 1945
- Inocybe fulviceps Murrill 1945
- Inocybe fulvida Bres. 1930
- Inocybe fulvidula Velen. 1939
- Inocybe fulvilubrica Matheny, Bougher & G.M.Gates 2012
- Inocybe fulvipes Kühner 1988
- Inocybe fulvo-olivacea Cleland 1933
- Inocybe fulvoumbonata Murrill 1945
- Inocybe fumosifolia Speg. 1926
- Inocybe furcata Takah.Kobay. 2003
- Inocybe furfurea Kühner 1955
- Inocybe fuscata Singer 1953
- Inocybe fuscescentipes Kühner 1988
- Inocybe fuscicothurnata Grund & D.E.Stuntz 1975
- Inocybe fuscidula Velen. 1920 – United Kingdom; Western Cape Province
- Inocybe fuscocinnamomea Singer 1953
- Inocybe fuscodisca (Peck) Massee 1904
- Inocybe fuscomarginata Kühner 1956 – United Kingdom
- Inocybe fuscoperonata Corner & E.Horak 1979
- Inocybe fuscospinulosa Corner & E.Horak 1979
- Inocybe fusipes Bizio, Franchi & M.Marchetti 2006

== G ==
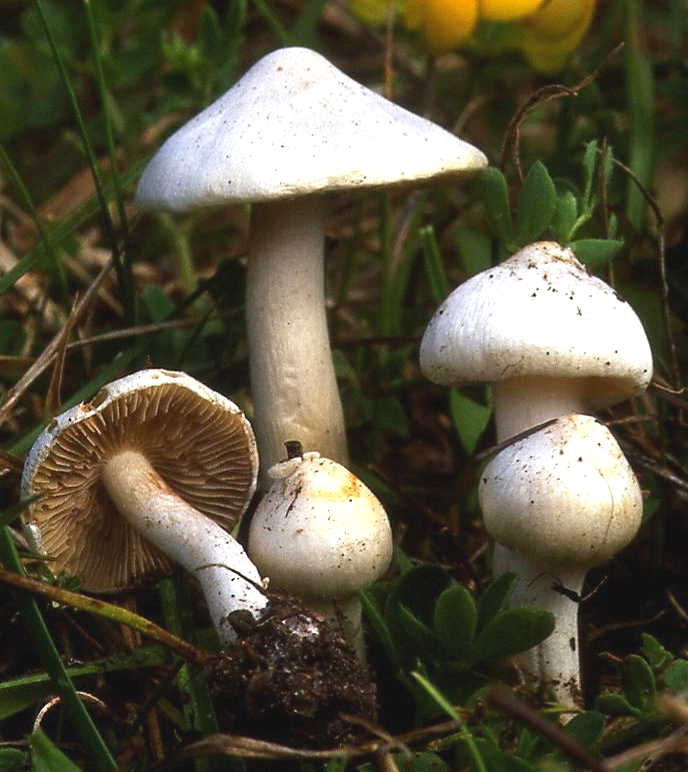
Inocybe geophylla

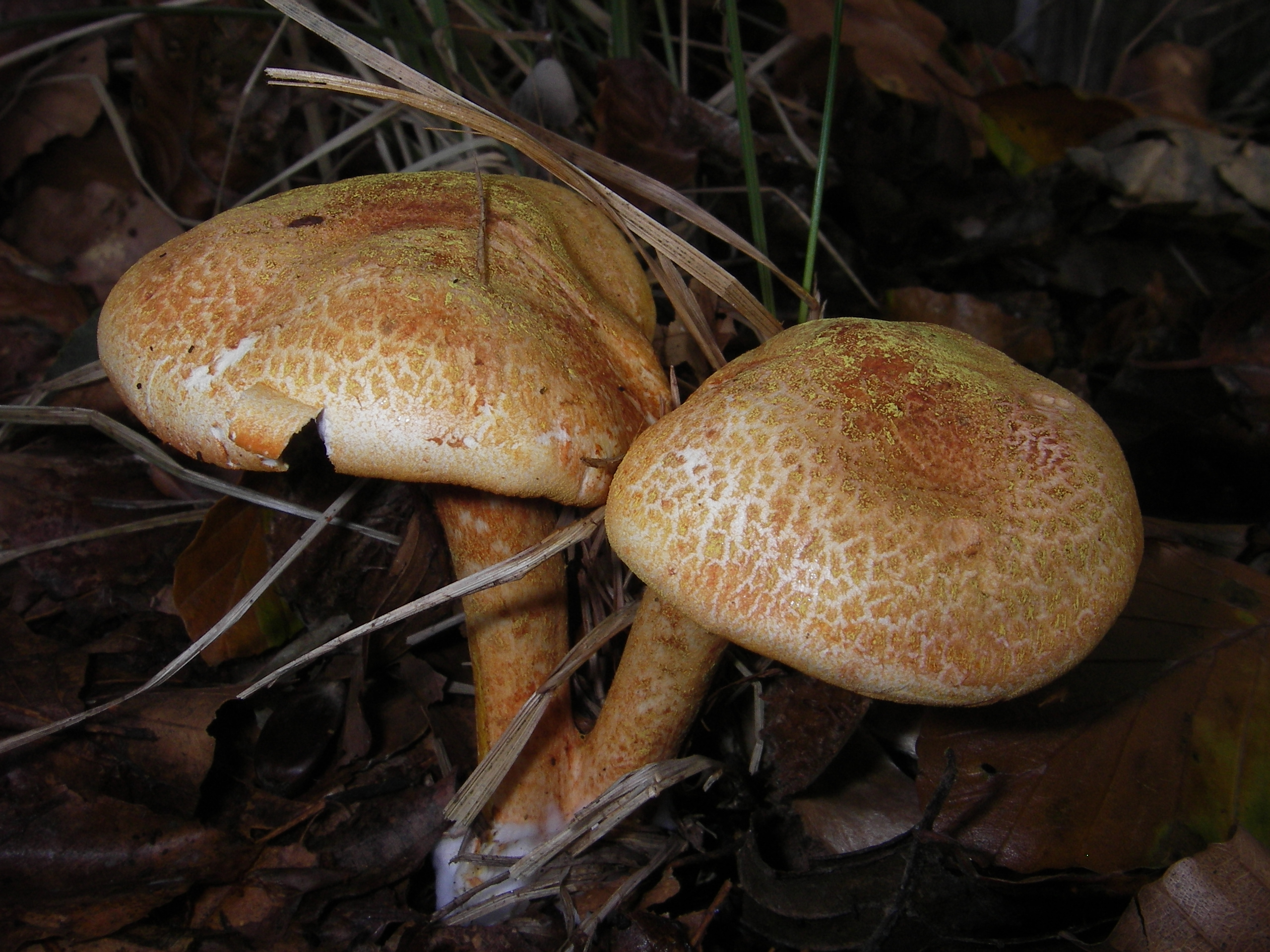
Inocybe gymnocarpa

- Inocybe gemina (E.Horak) Garrido 1988
- Inocybe geophylla (Bull.) P.Kumm. 1871 – Europe
- Inocybe geophyllomorpha Singer 1953
- Inocybe geraniodora J.Favre 1955
- Inocybe ghanaensis Pegler 1969 – Ghana
- Inocybe giacomi J.Favre 1955
- Inocybe gibbosula (E.Horak) Garrido 1988
- Inocybe gigacystis Singer 1953
- Inocybe gigantea Bon 1996
- Inocybe gigantispora Murrill 1945
- Inocybe gintliana Velen. 1920
- Inocybe glabra Kauffman 1918
- Inocybe glabrescens Velen. 1920 – Europe
- Inocybe glabripes Ricken 1915 – United Kingdom, Western Australia
- Inocybe glabrodisca P.D.Orton 1960 – United Kingdom
- Inocybe glareophila Bidaud & Fillion 1993
- Inocybe glaucodisca Buyck & Eyssart. 1999
- Inocybe glutinosifibrillosa Takah.Kobay. 2002
- Inocybe godeyi Gillet 1874 – Europe
- Inocybe godfrinioides Kühner 1988
- Inocybe goniopusio Stangl 1989
- Inocybe gracillima Carteret & Reumaux 2012
- Inocybe grammata Quél. 1880 – United Kingdom
- Inocybe grammocephala Malençon 1970
- Inocybe grammopodia Malençon 1970
- Inocybe granulosiceps (E.Horak) Garrido 1988
- Inocybe granulosipes Cleland 1933
- Inocybe griseobrunnea Métrod 195
- Inocybe griseola Takah.Kobay. 2002 – Honshu
- Inocybe griseolilacina J.E.Lange 1917 – United Kingdom
- Inocybe griseorubida K.P.D.Latha & Manim. 2015 – India
- Inocybe griseoscabrosa (Peck) Earle 1903
- Inocybe griseotarda Poirier 2002
- Inocybe griseovelata Kühner 1955 – United Kingdom
- Inocybe guttulifer Kühner 1988
- Inocybe gymnocarpa Kühner 1953
- Inocybe gymnopilus Kühner 1988

== H ==
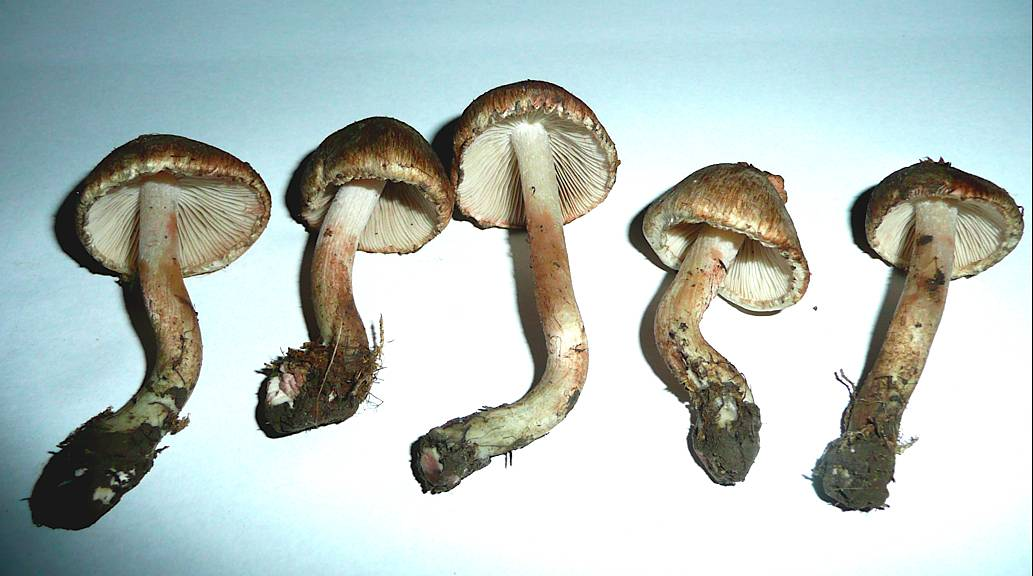
Inocybe haemacta is psychoactive

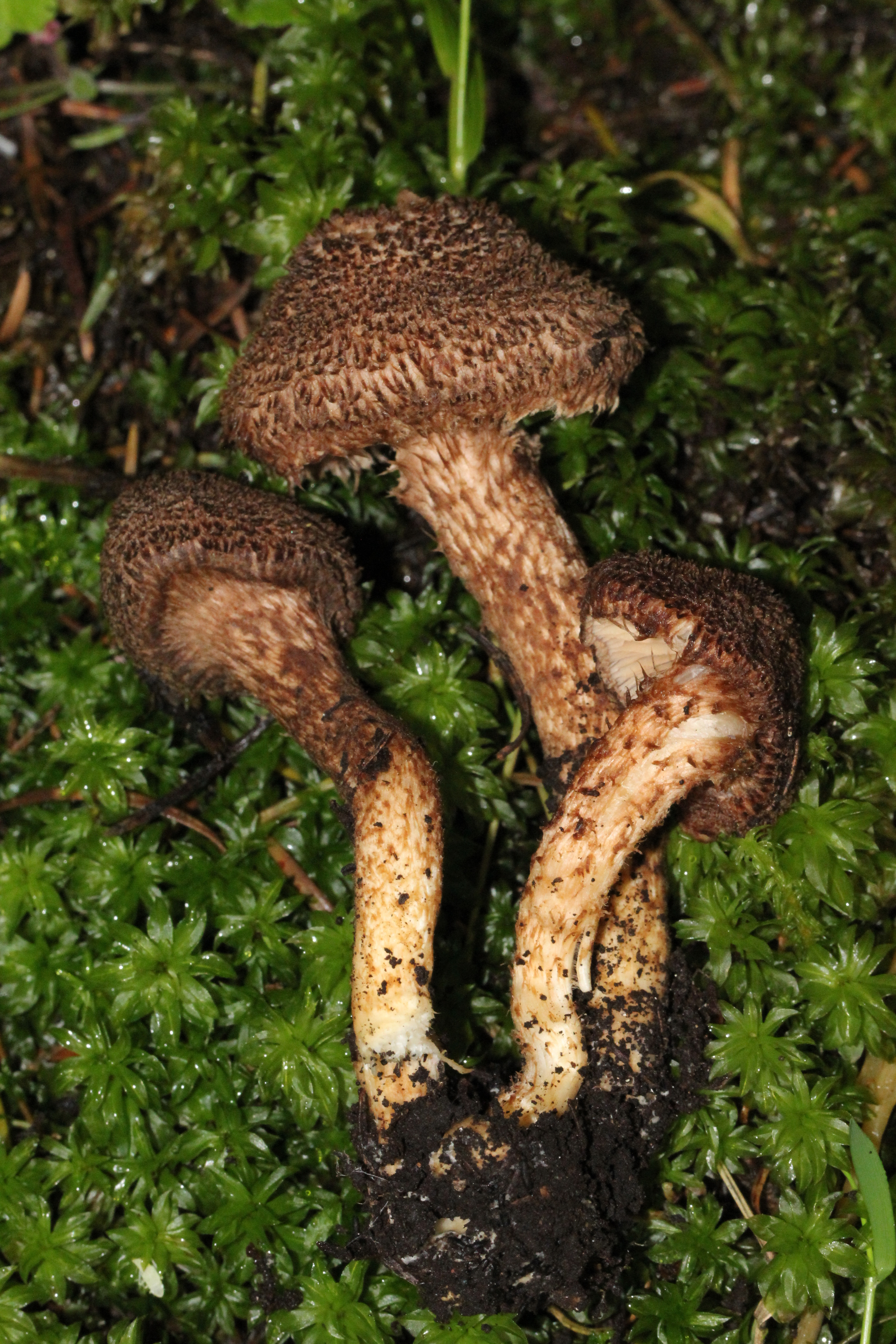
Inocybe hystrix

- Inocybe haemacta (Berk. & Cooke) Sacc. 1887 – United Kingdom
- Inocybe halophila R.Heim 1931
- Inocybe hebelomoides Murrill 1945
- Inocybe heimii Bon 1984 – Europe
- Inocybe hemileuca F.H.Nishida & D.E.Stuntz 1988
- Inocybe henryi Reumaux 1999
- Inocybe heterochrominea Grund & D.E.Stuntz 1983
- Inocybe heterocystis Kühner 1988
- Inocybe heterosemen Carteret & Reumaux 2012
- Inocybe hettematica (Britzelm.) Sacc. & Traverso 1910
- Inocybe hinnulea Kühner 1988
- Inocybe hinoana Yukawa & Katum. 1954
- Inocybe hirculus Vauras 1995
- Inocybe hirtella Bres. 1884 – Europe
- Inocybe hirtelloides Stangl & J.Veselský 1974
- Inocybe holoxantha Grund & D.E.Stuntz 1981
- Inocybe homomorpha (Singer) Singer 1931
- Inocybe horakii Raithelh. 1977
- Inocybe hotsoniana D.E.Stuntz 1947
- Inocybe huijsmanii Kuyper 1986 – United Kingdom
- Inocybe humilis (J.Favre & E.Horak) Esteve-Rav. & Vila 1998
- Inocybe hydrocybiformis (Corner & E.Horak) Garrido 1988
- Inocybe hygrophana Glowinski & Stangl 1981
- Inocybe hygrophoroides Shchukin 1985
- Inocybe hygrophorus Kühner 1956
- Inocybe hypervelata Bizio & Cervini 2005
- Inocybe hyperythra Rick 1930
- Inocybe hypophaea Furrer-Ziogas 1952
- Inocybe hypotheja Kühner 1988
- Inocybe hystrix (Fr.) P.Karst. 1879

== I ==
- Inocybe ianthinofolia Pegler 1983
- Inocybe iberilepora Fachada 2024
- Inocybe imbricata (Cleland) Garrido 1988
- Inocybe immaculipes Kühner 1988
- Inocybe immigrans Malloch 1982
- Inocybe impexa (Lasch) Kuyper 1986 – United Kingdom
- Inocybe inaensis Kobayasi 1952
- Inocybe incarnata Bres. 1884
- Inocybe incognita (E.Horak) Garrido 1988
- Inocybe indica Sarwal 1983
- Inocybe infelix Peck 1887
- Inocybe infida (Peck) Massee 1910
- Inocybe infracta Velen. 1920
- Inocybe infumata Kühner 1988
- Inocybe ingae Pegler 1983
- Inocybe inodora Velen. 1920 – United Kingdom
- Inocybe insignis A.H.Sm. 1941
- Inocybe insignissima Romagn. 1979
- Inocybe insinuata Kauffman 1924
- Inocybe insuavis (Britzelm.) Sacc. & Traverso 1910
- Inocybe intricata Peck 1909
- Inocybe invenusta (Britzelm.) Sacc. & Traverso 1910 (accepted name)
- Inocybe involuta Kuyper 1989
- Inocybe ionides Corner & E. Horak 1979
- Inocybe ionochlora Romagn. 1979
- Inocybe irregularinodulosa Takah.Kobay. 2002
- Inocybe iseranensis E.Ferrari 2010

== J ==
- Inocybe jacobi Kühner 1956 – Europe
- Inocybe jalapensis (Murrill) Singer 1958
- Inocybe jamaicensis Murrill 1912
- Inocybe javorkae Babos & Stangl 1985
- Inocybe johannae Kühner 1988
- Inocybe juniperina M.Marchetti, Franchi & Bizio 2004

== K ==
- Inocybe kasugayamensis Hongo 1963
- Inocybe kauffmanii A.H.Sm. 1939
- Inocybe kittilensis Kokkonen & Vauras 2013
- Inocybe kobayasii Hongo 1959
- Inocybe kohistanensis S.Jabeen, I.Ahmad & A.N.Khalid 2016
- Inocybe krieglsteineri Fernández Sas. 2005

== L ==
- Inocybe lacera (Fr.) P.Kumm. 1871 – Europe
- Inocybe laeta Alessio 1979
- Inocybe laetior D.E.Stuntz 1950
- Inocybe laevispora Hruby 1930
- Inocybe lageniformis Takah.Kobay. 2002
- Inocybe lanatodisca Kauffman 1918 – USA
- Inocybe langei R.Heim 1931
- Inocybe lanuginosa (Bull.) P.Kumm. 1871 – United Kingdom
- Inocybe lapponica Kokkonen & Vauras 2013
- Inocybe lasseri Dennis 1953
- Inocybe lasseroides (E.Horak) Garrido 1988
- Inocybe lateraria Rick 1920
- Inocybe latericia E.Horak 1978
- Inocybe lavandulochlora Esteve-Rav. & M.Villarreal 2001
- Inocybe leonina Esteve-Rav. & A. Caball. 2009
- Inocybe lepidocephala Speg. 1898
- Inocybe lepidotella Matheny & Aime 2012
- Inocybe lepiotoides Reumaux 1983
- Inocybe leptoclada Takah. Kobay. & Courtec. 200
- Inocybe leptocystella G.F.Atk. 1918
- Inocybe leptocystis G.F.Atk. 1918 – United Kingdom
- Inocybe leptoderma Takah. Kobay. & Nukada 2002
- Inocybe leptophylla G.F.Atk. 1918 – United Kingdom
- Inocybe leucoblema Kühner 1956
- Inocybe leucoloma Kühner 1988
- Inocybe leucopoda Velen. 1920
- Inocybe lilacina (Peck) Kauffman 1918
- Inocybe lilacinolamellata (Britzelm.) Sacc. & Traverso 1910
- Inocybe lilacinosquamosa Matheny, Aime & T.W.Henkel 2003
- Inocybe lilofastigiata (Stangl & J.Veselský) Bon 1996
- Inocybe littoralis Pegler 1983
- Inocybe longipes Massee 1908
- Inocybe longispora M.Lange 1957
- Inocybe lorillardiana Murrill 1911
- Inocybe lutea Kobayasi & Hongo 1952
- Inocybe luteifolia A.H.Sm. 1941
- Inocybe luteipes J.Favre 1955
- Inocybe luteobulbosa E.Horak 1978
- Inocybe luteola Takah.Kobay. 2009
- Inocybe lutescens Velen. 1920

== M ==
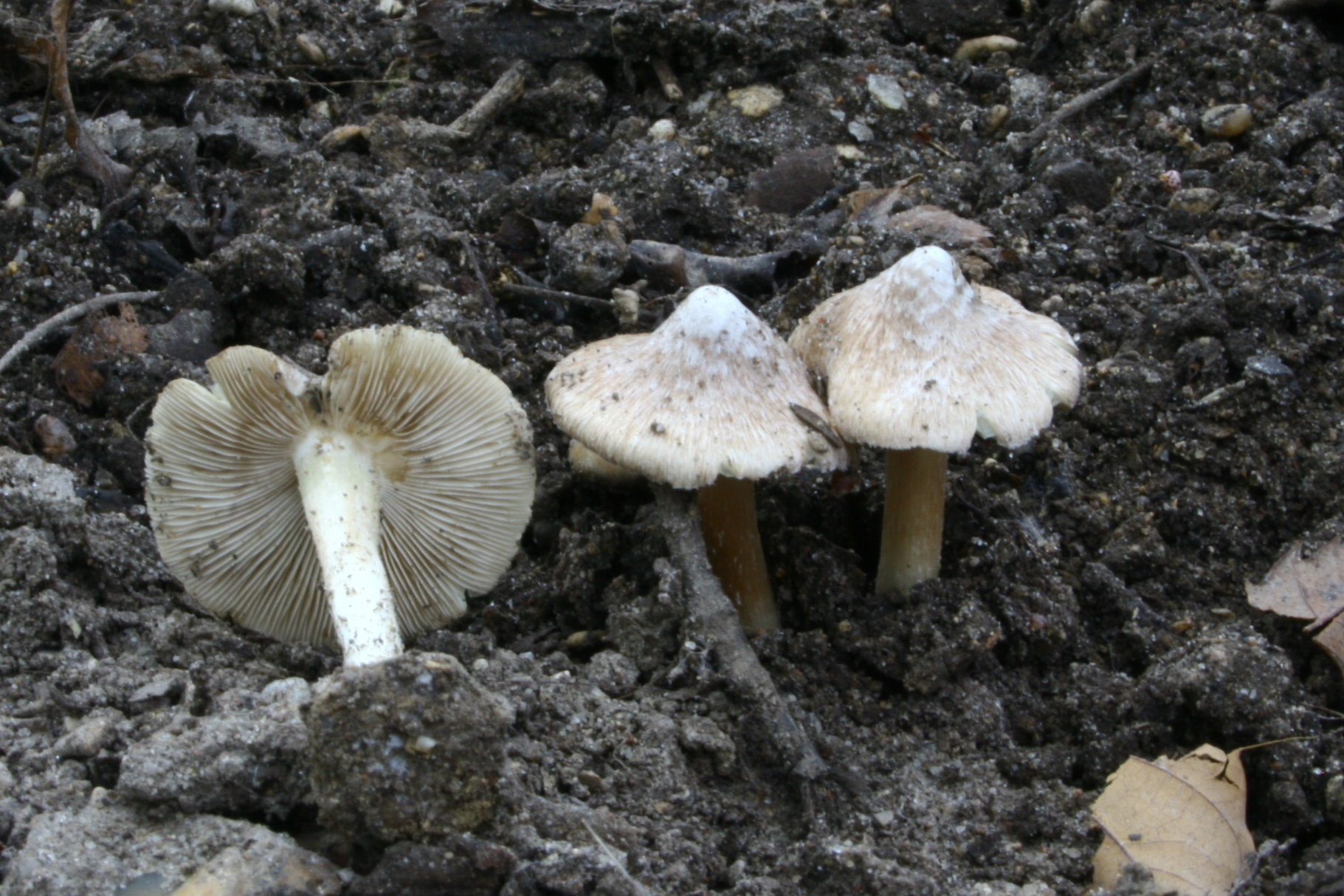
Inocybe maculata

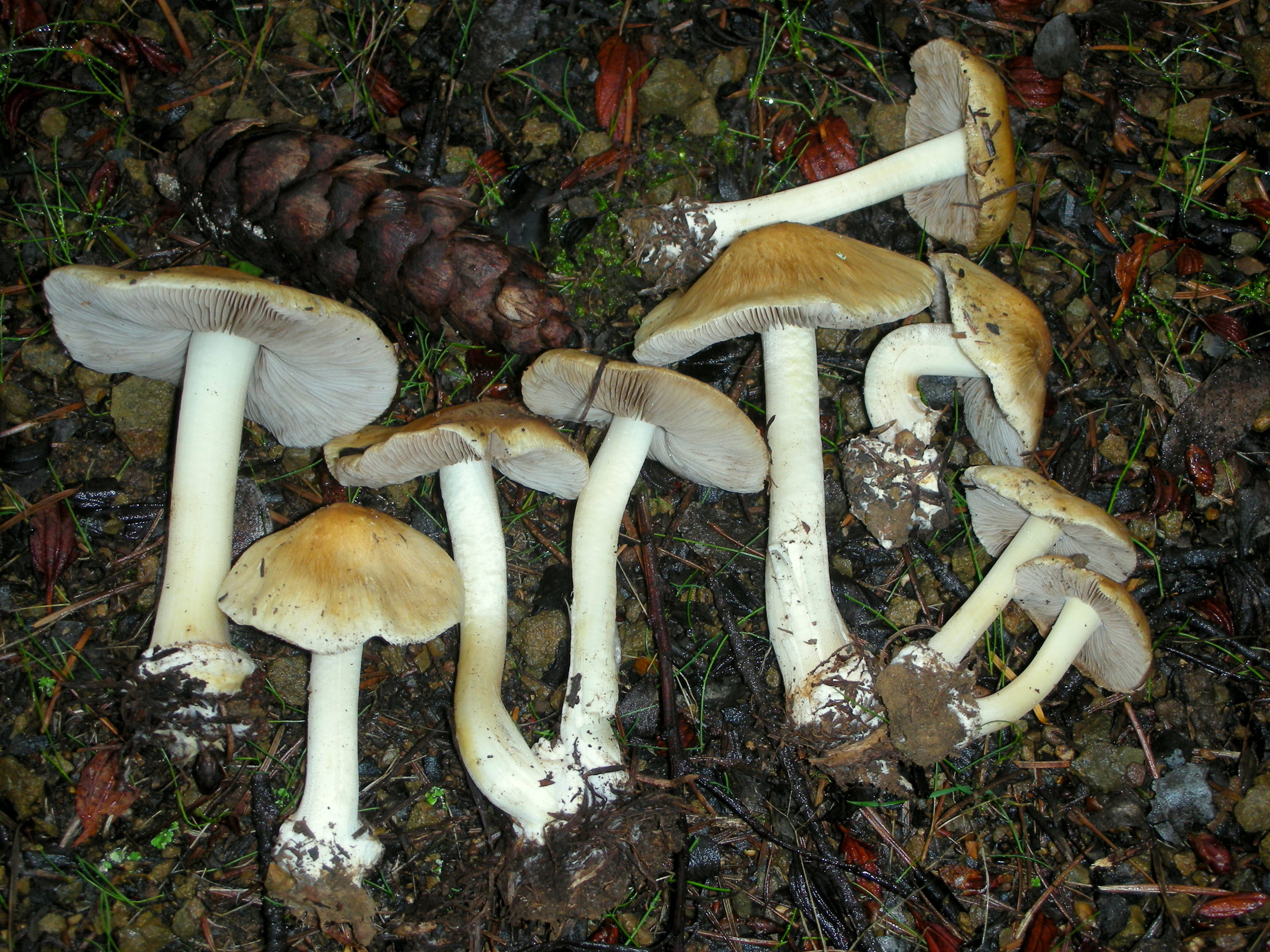
Inocybe mixtilis

- Inocybe macrocystis Velen. 1920
- Inocybe macrosperma Hongo 1959
- Inocybe macrospora Kobayasi 1971
- Inocybe maculata Boud. 1885 – United Kingdom
- Inocybe maculipes J.Favre 1955
- Inocybe magnicarpa Takah.Kobay. 2005
- Inocybe magnifica (E.Horak) Garrido 1988
- Inocybe magnifolia Matheny, Aime & T.W.Henkel 2012
- Inocybe malenconiana Bon 1997
- Inocybe malenconii R.Heim 1931
- Inocybe mammifera M.M.Moser 1992
- Inocybe mammosa Velen. 1920
- Inocybe manuelae E.Ferrari & Bizio 2006
- Inocybe margaritispora (Berk.) Sacc. 1887 – United Kingdom
- Inocybe marginata Matheny, Aime & T.W.Henkel 2012
- Inocybe mariluanensis (Speg.) Singer 1951
- Inocybe maritimoides (Peck) Sacc. 1887
- Inocybe marmoripes G.F.Atk. 1918
- Inocybe martinica Pegler 1983 – Martinique
- Inocybe mascardi Raithelh. 1990
- Inocybe masoviensis Rudn.-Jez. 1967
- Inocybe matrisdei Singer 1962
- Inocybe mediocris (Corner & E.Horak) Garrido 1988
- Inocybe megalospora Rick 1919
- Inocybe melampyri Velen. 1947
- Inocybe melanopoda D.E.Stuntz 1954
- Inocybe melanopus D.E.Stuntz 1954
- Inocybe melissolens Reumaux 2001
- Inocybe melleiconica Grund & D.E.Stuntz 1968
- Inocybe melliolens Kühner 1988
- Inocybe mendica E.Horak 1978
- Inocybe menthi-gustans F.H.Nishida 1988
- Inocybe metrodii Stangl & J.Veselský 1979
- Inocybe microfastigiata Kühner 1988
- Inocybe microteroxantha Grund & D.E.Stuntz 1981
- Inocybe mimica Massee 1904
- Inocybe minima Peck 1913
- Inocybe minimispora Reumaux 1986
- Inocybe minuta P.Karst. 1906
- Inocybe minutispora Murrill 1945
- Inocybe minutissima Carteret & Reumaux 2012
- Inocybe mirabilis Velen. 1920
- Inocybe misakaensis Matheny & Watling 2004
- Inocybe mitracea Velen. 1920
- Inocybe mixtiliformis Singer 1954
- Inocybe mixtilis (Britzelm.) Sacc. 1887 – United Kingdom; Malawi; Western Cape Province; Zambia
- Inocybe moelleri Eyssart. & A.Delannoy 2006
- Inocybe monochroa J. Favre 1955
- Inocybe montana Kobayasi 1952
- Inocybe monticola Kropp, Matheny & Nanagy. 2010
- Inocybe moravica Hruby 1930
- Inocybe mucronata R. Heim 1931
- Inocybe multicingulata E.Horak 1979
- Inocybe multicolor Raithelh. 1977
- Inocybe multicoronata A.H.Sm. 1939
- Inocybe multispora Murrill 1945
- Inocybe muricellata Bres. 1905 – United Kingdom
- Inocybe murrayana Cleland 1933
- Inocybe mussooriensis Sarwal 1983
- Inocybe mutata (Peck) Massee 1904
- Inocybe mycenoides Kuyper 1986 – United Kingdom
- Inocybe myriadophylla Vauras & E.Larss. 2012
- Inocybe mystica Stangl & Glowinski 1980
- Inocybe mytiliodora Stangl & Vauras 1988 – United Kingdom

== N ==
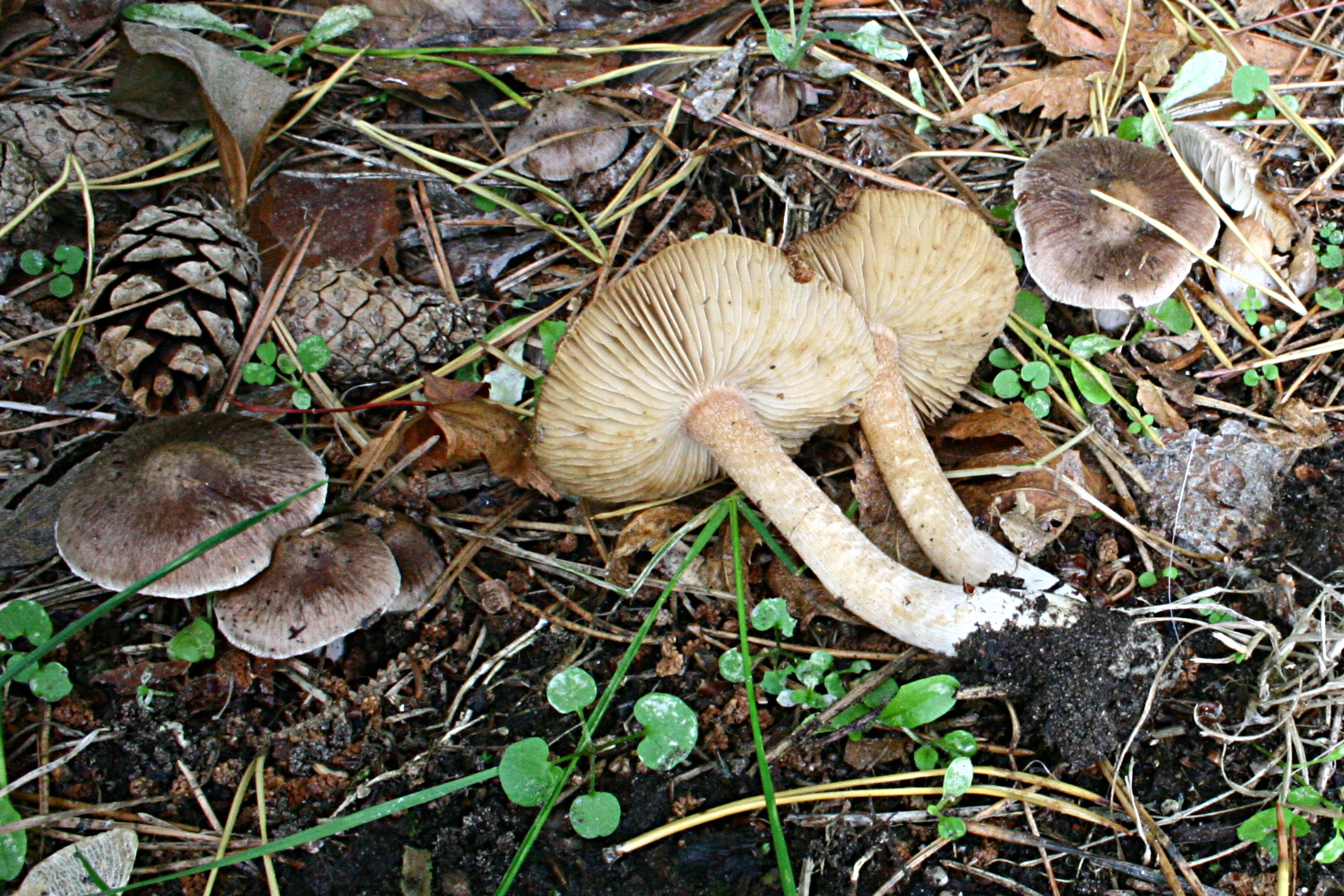
Inocybe nitidiuscula

- Inocybe nana F.H.Møller 1945
- Inocybe napiformis Takah.Kobay. 2009
- Inocybe napipes J.E.Lange 1917 – United Kingdom
- Inocybe naucoriiformis Velen. 1939
- Inocybe nematoloma Joss. 1974
- Inocybe nemorosa (R.Heim) Grund & D.E.Stuntz 1968
- Inocybe neobrunnescens Grund & D.E.Stuntz 1970
- Inocybe neoflocculosa Kobayasi 1952
- Inocybe neomicrospora Kobayasi 1952
- Inocybe neorufula Esteve-Rav., Macau & Ferville 2012
- Inocybe neotropicalis Singer, I.J.A.Aguiar & Ivory 1983
- Inocybe neoumbrina Kobayasi 1952
- Inocybe neuhoffii Bres. 1926
- Inocybe neuquenensis Singer 1954
- Inocybe nigrescens G.F.Atk. 191
- Inocybe nigrescentipes Reumaux 2001
- Inocybe nigridisca Peck 1888
- Inocybe niigatensis Hongo 1959
- Inocybe nikkoensis Kobayasi 1952
- Inocybe nitida Velen. 1920
- Inocybe nitidiuscula (Britzelm.) Lapl. 1894 – Europe
- Inocybe niveivelata D.E.Stuntz ex Kropp, Matheny & Hutchison 2013 – USA
- Inocybe nobilis (R.Heim) Alessio 1980
- Inocybe nodulosa Kauffman 1924
- Inocybe nodulosospora Kobayasi 1952
- Inocybe nodulospora (Peck) Sacc. 1891
- Inocybe notodryina Singer, I.J.A.Aguiar & Ivory 1983
- Inocybe nucleata Murrill 1945
- Inocybe nuda Velen. 1920
- Inocybe numerosigibba Takah.Kobay. 2002

== O ==
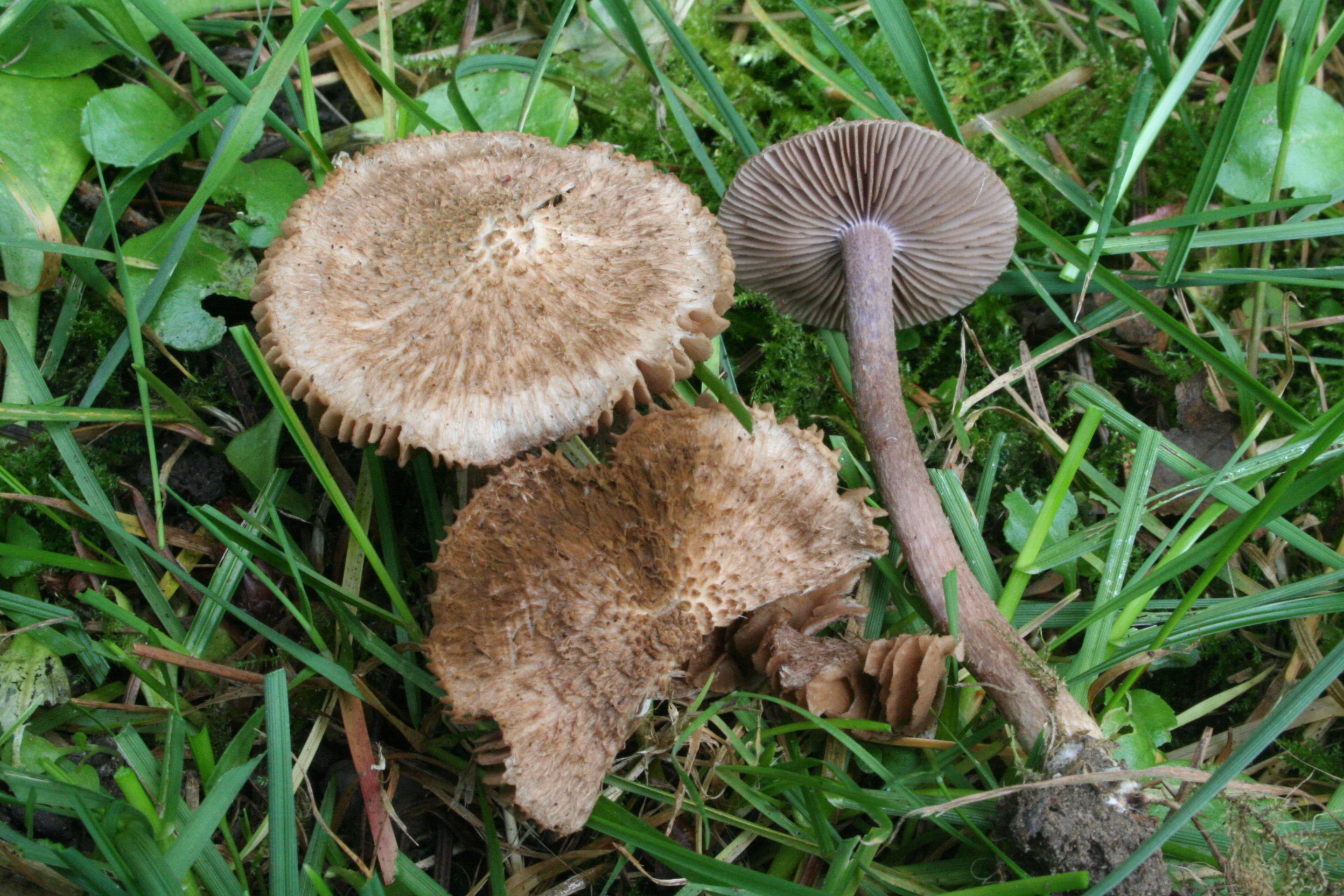
Inocybe obscura

- Inocybe oblectabilis (Britzelm.) Sacc. 1895 – United Kingdom
- Inocybe obscurella Carteret & Reumaux 2012
- Inocybe obscurobadia (J.Favre) Grund & D.E.Stuntz 1977 – United Kingdom
- Inocybe obscuromellea Poirier 2002
- Inocybe obsoleta Romagn. 1958 – Europe, USA
- Inocybe obtusiuscula Kühner 1988
- Inocybe occidentalis Kropp, Matheny & Hutchison 2013 – USA
- Inocybe ochracea Stangl 1979
- Inocybe ochraceomarginata Kauffman 1924
- Inocybe ochraceoscabra G.F.Atk. 1918
- Inocybe ochroalba Bruyl. 1970 – United Kingdom
- Inocybe ochrofulva Malençon 1970
- Inocybe ochroleuca J.Favre 1955
- Inocybe ochrorufa Sarwal 1983
- Inocybe odora Velen. 1939
- Inocybe oehrensii Garrido & E.Horak 1988
- Inocybe olgae Velen. 1920
- Inocybe olida Maire 1933 – United Kingdom
- Inocybe olidissima (Ripart) Poirier & Reumaux 1990
- Inocybe olivaceobrunnea J.Favre ex Kuyper 1986
- Inocybe olivaceonigra (E.Horak) Garrido 1988
- Inocybe olorinata E.Horak 1979
- Inocybe olpidiocystis G.F.Atk. 1918
- Inocybe olympiana A.H.Sm. 1939
- Inocybe orbata Malençon 1970
- Inocybe oreadoides Carteret 2000
- Inocybe oreina J.Favre 1955
- Inocybe ortegae Esteve-Rav. 2001
- Inocybe ovatocystis Boursier & Kühner 1928
- Inocybe ovoidea Takah.Kobay. 2003
- Inocybe ovoideicystis Métrod 1956
- Inocybe ozeensis Kobayasi 1952

== P ==
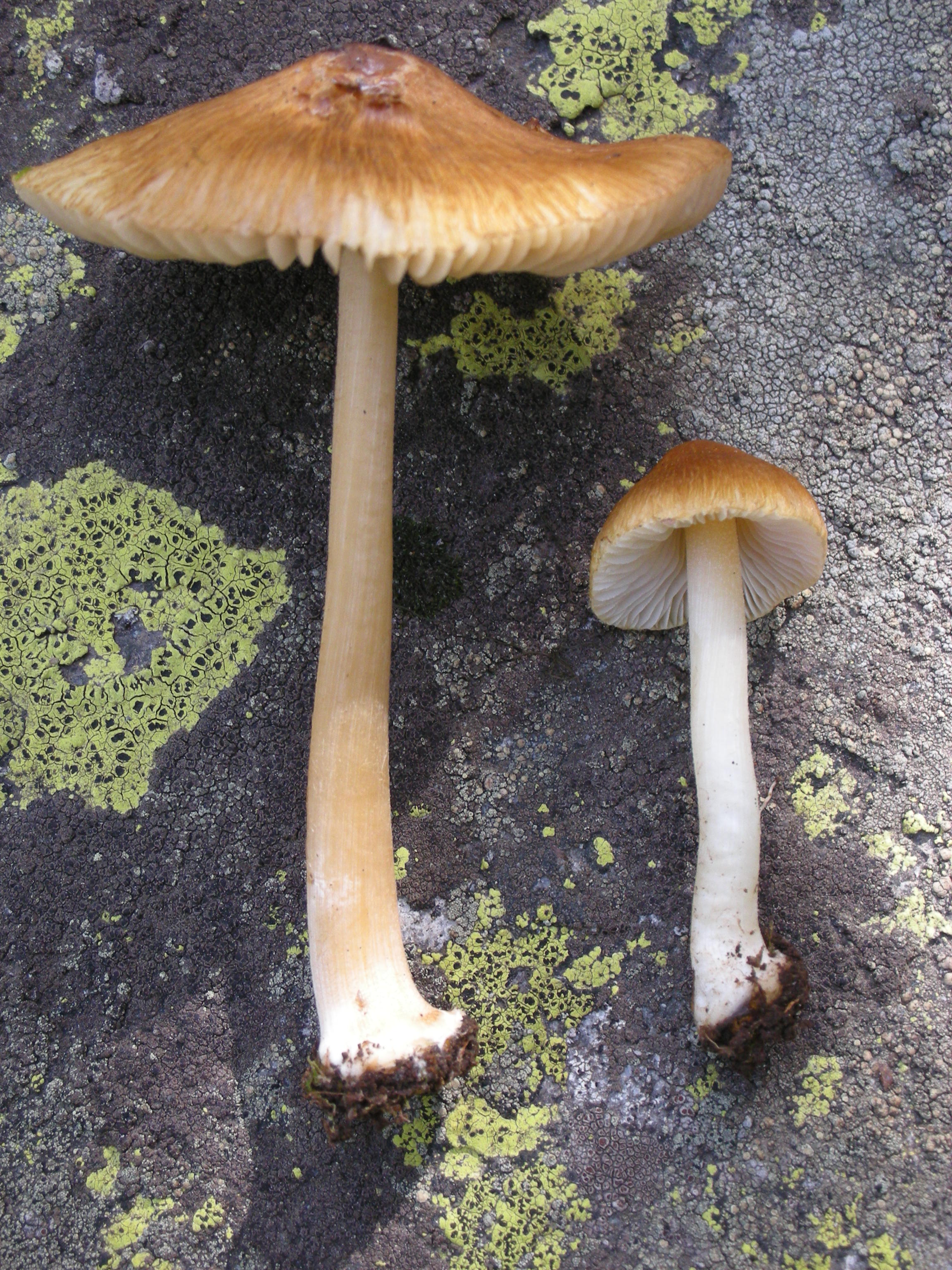
Inocybe praetervisa

- Inocybe pachycreas R.Heim & Romagn. 1931
- Inocybe pachydermica Takah.Kobay. 2002
- Inocybe pachypleura Takah.Kobay. 2002
- Inocybe pahangi (Corner & E.Horak) Garrido 1988
- Inocybe palaeotropica E.Turnbull & Watling 1995
- Inocybe pallescens Velen. 1920
- Inocybe pallida Velen. 1920 – Europe
- Inocybe pallidicremea Grund & D.E.Stuntz 1977
- Inocybe pallidobrunnea Kauffman 1924
- Inocybe pallidospora Beller & Bon 1997
- Inocybe paludicola Kokkonen & Vauras 2013
- Inocybe paludinella (Peck) Sacc. 1887 – United Kingdom
- Inocybe paludosa Kühner 1988
- Inocybe paludosella G.F.Atk. 1918
- Inocybe papillata (E.Horak) Garrido 1988
- Inocybe paradoxa R.Heim 1934
- Inocybe paralanuginosa Pegler 1983 – Guadeloupe
- Inocybe pararubens Carteret & Reumaux 2012
- Inocybe parcecoacta Grund & D.E.Stuntz 1977
- Inocybe pargasensis Vauras 1997
- Inocybe parvispora Murrill 1945
- Inocybe patibilis Reumaux 1988
- Inocybe paucicystidiosa (Bon) Franchi & M.Marchetti 2008
- Inocybe paucigibba Singer 1965
- Inocybe pedemontana Alessio 1980
- Inocybe pedicellata Velen. 1920
- Inocybe pedunculata Velen. 1920
- Inocybe pegleri Sarwal 1983
- Inocybe pelargoniodora Kühner 1988
- Inocybe pelargonium Kühner 1955 – Europe
- Inocybe perlata (Cooke) Sacc. 1887 – United Kingdom
- Inocybe permucida Grund & D.E.Stuntz 1983
- Inocybe pernivosa (Murrill) Singer 1951
- Inocybe peronatella J.Favre 1960
- Inocybe perpusilla Velen. 1920
- Inocybe personata Kühner 1955
- Inocybe pertomentosa Murrill 1945
- Inocybe petchii Boedijn 1951
- Inocybe petiginosa (Fr.) Gillet 1876 – United Kingdom
- Inocybe petroselinolens Carteret & Reumaux 2012
- Inocybe phaeocystidiosa Esteve-Rav., G.Moreno & Bon 1987
- Inocybe phaeodisca Kühner 1955 – Europe
- Inocybe phaeoleuca Kühner 1955 – Europe
- Inocybe phaeosquamosa Fachada 2024
- Inocybe phaeosquarrosa E.Horak 1978
- Inocybe pholiotinoides Romagn. 1979
- Inocybe picetorum Velen. 1920
- Inocybe picrosma D.E.Stuntz 1950
- Inocybe pintureaui Duchemin 1979
- Inocybe piricystis J.Favre 1955
- Inocybe plocamophora Singer, I.J.A.Aguiar & Ivory 1983
- Inocybe pluteoides Höhn. 1907
- Inocybe polycystidiata Kobayasi 1952
- Inocybe polytrichi-norvegici Kühner 1988
- Inocybe populea Takah.Kobay. & Courtec. 2000
- Inocybe porcorum Kokkonen & Vauras 2013
- Inocybe posterula (Britzelm.) Sacc. 1887 – United Kingdom
- Inocybe poujolii R.Heim 1931
- Inocybe prae-echinulata Murrill 1941
- Inocybe praecox Kropp, Matheny & Nanagy. 2010
- Inocybe praefarinacea (Murrill) Singer 1951
- Inocybe praenodulosa Murrill 1941
- Inocybe praenucleata Murrill 1945
- Inocybe praetervisa Quél. 1883 – United Kingdom
- Inocybe procera E.Horak 1979
- Inocybe prominens Kauffman 1924
- Inocybe proximella P.Karst. 1882 – United Kingdom
- Inocybe pruinosa R.Heim 1931 – United Kingdom
- Inocybe psammobrunnea Bon 1990
- Inocybe pseudo-orbata Esteve-Rav. & García Blanco 2003
- Inocybe pseudoasterospora Kühner & Boursier 1932 – United Kingdom
- Inocybe pseudobrunnea Alessio 1987
- Inocybe pseudoconfusa Métrod 1956
- Inocybe pseudocookei Métrod ex Bon 1996
- Inocybe pseudodestricta Stangl & J.Veselský 1973 – United Kingdom
- Inocybe pseudoflocculosa Kühner 1988
- Inocybe pseudograta Alessio 1983
- Inocybe pseudogriseolilacina G.Y.Zheng & Z.S.Bi 1997
- Inocybe pseudohaemacta Bon & Courtec. 1985
- Inocybe pseudohiulca Kühner 1933 – United Kingdom
- Inocybe pseudonobilis Reumaux 2001
- Inocybe pseudoreducta Stangl & Glowinski 1981 – United Kingdom
- Inocybe pseudorhacodes Tak. Kobay. & Courtec. 1993
- Inocybe pseudorubens Carteret & Reumaux 2001
- Inocybe pseudotarda Moënne-Loccoz & Poirier 2012
- Inocybe pseudoteraturgus Vauras & Kokkonen 2013
- Inocybe pseudoumbrina Stangl 1975
- Inocybe pulchella Matheny, Aime & T.W.Henkel 2003
- Inocybe pullata A.Pearson ex Pegler 1996 – Western Cape Province
- Inocybe punctatosquamosa (E.Horak) Garrido 1988
- Inocybe purpureobadia Esteve-Rav. & A.Caball. 2009
- Inocybe purpureoflavida K.B.Vrinda & C.K.Pradeep 1997 – Kerala
- Inocybe pusillima (Corner & E. Horak) Garrido 1988
- Inocybe pusina F.H.Møller 1945
- Inocybe pusio P.Karst. 1889 – United Kingdom
- Inocybe putilla Bres. 1884 – United Kingdom
- Inocybe pyriformis Takah. Kobay. & S.Kurogi 2009
- Inocybe pyriodora (Pers.) P.Kumm. 1871 – United Kingdom
- Inocybe pyrotricha D.E.Stuntz 1950

== Q ==
- Inocybe queletii Konrad 1929
- Inocybe quercetorum Reumaux 2001
- Inocybe quercina Hongo 1982
- Inocybe quietiodor Bon 1976 – United Kingdom

== R ==
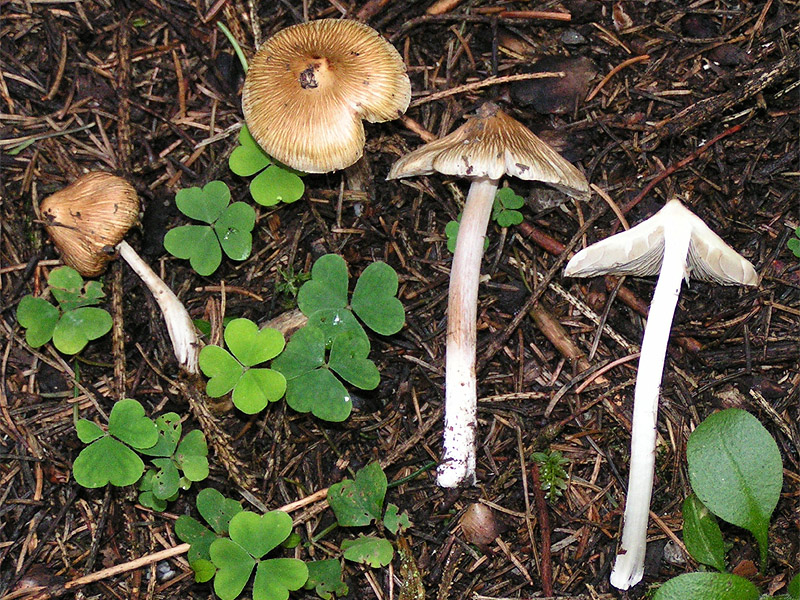
Inocybe rimosa

- Inocybe radiata Peck 1895
- Inocybe rainierensis D.E.Stuntz 1950
- Inocybe rasiana Sacc. & Trotter 1920
- Inocybe ravaensis Kalamees & Shchukin 1985
- Inocybe redolens Matheny, Bougher & G.M.Gates 2012
- Inocybe reisneri Velen. 1920
- Inocybe relicina (Fr.) Quél. 1888 – United Kingdom
- Inocybe renispora E.Horak 1978
- Inocybe rennyi (Berk. & Broome) Sacc. 1887 – United Kingdom
- Inocybe reticulata Cout. 1925
- Inocybe retipes G.F.Atk. 1918
- Inocybe rhodella Matheny, Aime & M.E.Sm. 2012
- Inocybe rhombispora Massee 1905
- Inocybe rigidipes Peck 1898
- Inocybe rimosa (Bull.) P.Kumm. 1871 – Europe
- Inocybe rimosobispora Bizio, Esteve-Rav. & Contu 2005
- Inocybe rimosoides Peck 1911
- Inocybe rivularis Jacobsson & Vauras 1990
- Inocybe robertii Esteve-Rav. & A.Caball. 2009
- Inocybe rocabrunae Esteve-Rav. & Vila 2002
- Inocybe rohlenae Velen. 1920
- Inocybe romana Lonati 1985
- Inocybe roseifolia Murrill 1945
- Inocybe roseipes Malençon 1970
- Inocybe rosella Velen. 1920
- Inocybe rosellicaularis Grund & D.E.Stuntz 1983
- Inocybe rostrata Velen. 1920
- Inocybe rubellipes G.F.Atk. 1918
- Inocybe rubens (R.Heim) Huijsman 1953
- Inocybe rubidofracta E.Ferrari 2010
- Inocybe rubroindica Banning & Peck 1891
- Inocybe rufidula Kauffman 1924
- Inocybe rufobrunnea J.Favre 195
- Inocybe rufofusca (J.Favre) Bon 1997
- Inocybe rufolutea J.Favre 1955
- Inocybe rufotacta Schwöbel & Stangl 1982
- Inocybe rufula Malençon ex Alessio 1986
- Inocybe rufuloides Bon 1984
- Inocybe rupestris J.Favre 1955

== S ==
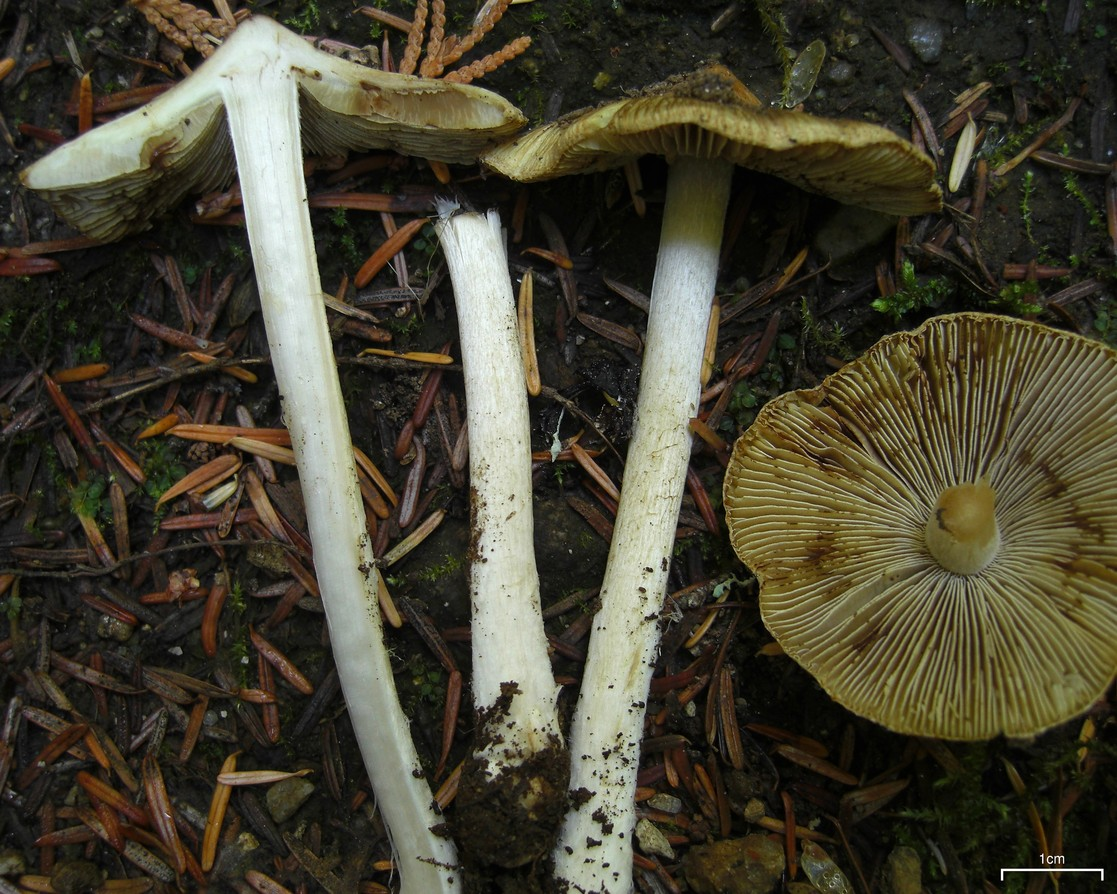
Inocybe sororia

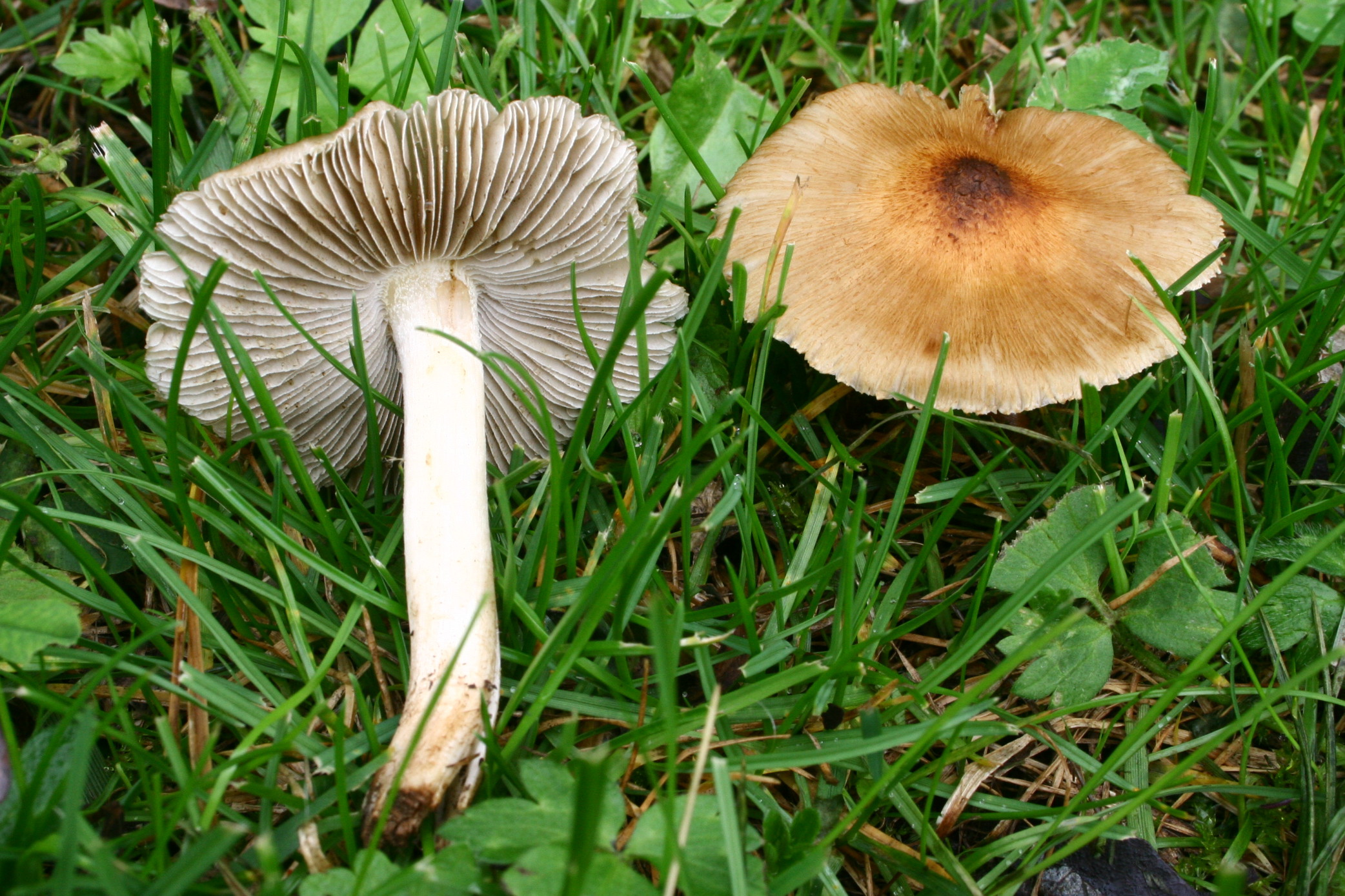
Inocybe squamata

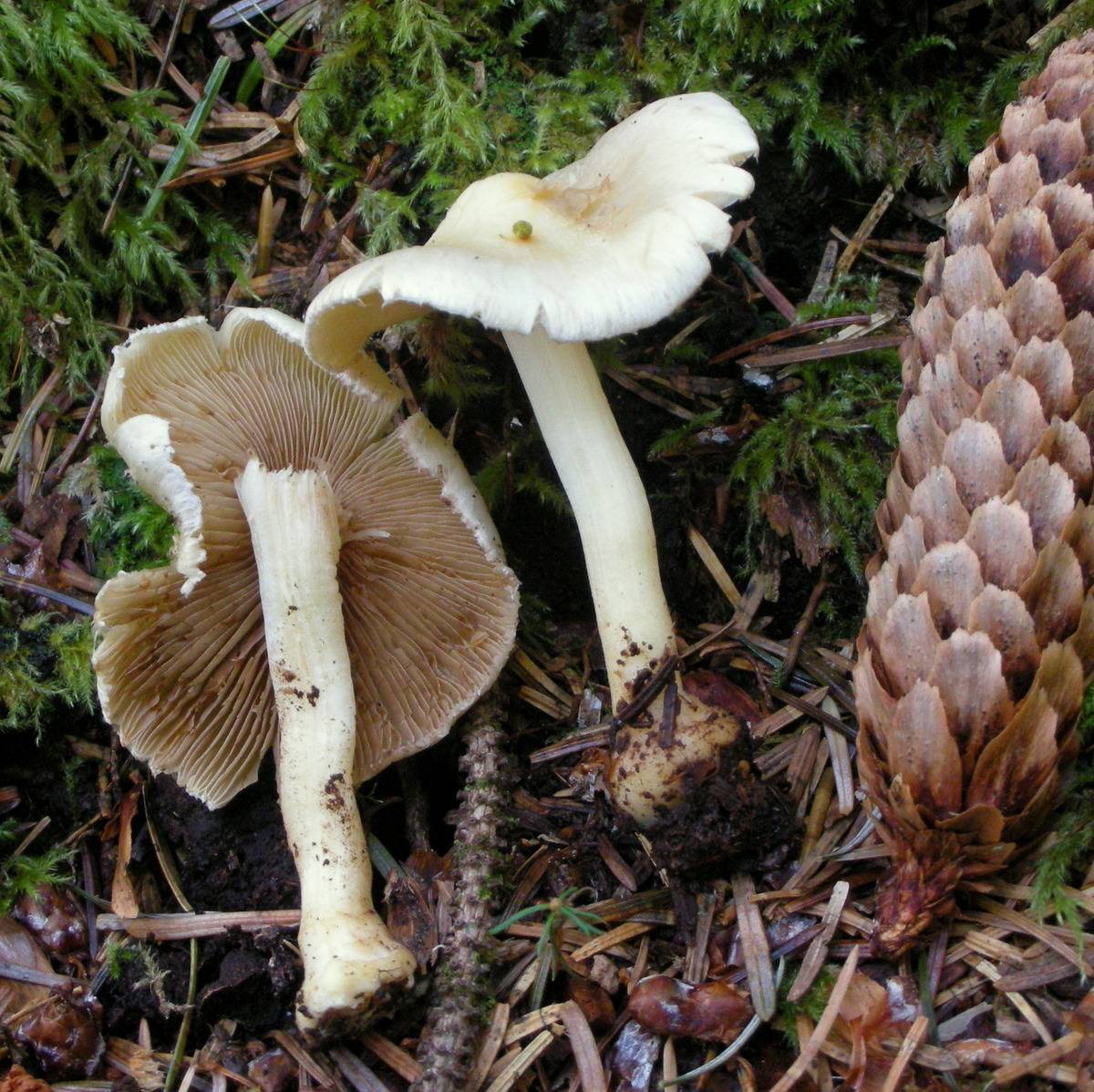
Inocybe suaveolens

- Inocybe saliceticola Vauras & Kokkonen 2008
- Inocybe salicis Kühner 1955 – United Kingdom
- Inocybe salicis-herbaceae Kühner 1988
- Inocybe sambucella G.F.Atk. 1918
- Inocybe sambucina (Fr.) Quél. 1872 – United Kingdom
- Inocybe sandrae Zitzmann 2002
- Inocybe sapinea Velen. 1939
- Inocybe saponacea Kuyper 1986
- Inocybe scabelliformis Malençon 1970
- Inocybe scabriuscula E.Horak 1978
- Inocybe sclerotiicola R.Heim & Gilles 1969
- Inocybe semifulva Grund & D.E.Stuntz 1981
- Inocybe semilutescens Singer 1969
- Inocybe senkawaensis Kobayasi 1952
- Inocybe sericella Takah. Kobay. & S. Onishi 2010
- Inocybe sericeopoda Furrer-Ziogas 1995
- Inocybe serotina Peck 1904 – United Kingdom
- Inocybe serrata Cleland 1933
- Inocybe shoreae (E.Horak & Bas) Garrido 1988
- Inocybe sibionipes Deïana & Carteret 2002
- Inocybe sierraensis Kropp & Matheny 2004
- Inocybe silvae-herbaceae Kokkonen & Vauras 2013
- Inocybe similis Bres. 1905
- Inocybe sindonia (Fr.) P.Karst. 1879 – United Kingdom
- Inocybe sinuospora Matheny & Bougher 2012
- Inocybe siskiyouensis Kauffman 1930
- Inocybe solida Velen. 1939
- Inocybe solidipes Kühner 1988
- Inocybe soluta Velen. 1920 – Canary Islands; United Kingdom
- Inocybe sordida Rick 1920
- Inocybe sororia Kauffman 1924
- Inocybe specialis (Britzelm.) Sacc. & Traverso 1910
- Inocybe sphaerospora Kobayasi 1952
- Inocybe spinosae Velen. 1939
- Inocybe splendens R.Heim 1932 – United Kingdom
- Inocybe splendentoides Bon 1990
- Inocybe splendidissima Carteret & Reumaux 2001
- Inocybe spuria Jacobsson & E.Larss. 2009 – Sweden, Norway, Finland, USA
- Inocybe squamata J.E.Lange 1917 – United Kingdom
- Inocybe squamosa Bres. 1902
- Inocybe squamosodisca Peck 1904
- Inocybe squamulosa Kobayasi 1952
- Inocybe squarrosa Rea 1916
- Inocybe squarrosoamethystina Singer 1938
- Inocybe squarrosoannulata Kühner 1988
- Inocybe squarrosolutea (Corner & E.Horak) Garrido 1988
- Inocybe stangliana Kuyper 1986
- Inocybe staurospora (E.Horak) Garrido 1988
- Inocybe stellatospora (Peck) Massee 1904 – United Kingdom
- Inocybe stenospora Stangl & Bresinsky 1983
- Inocybe straminipes Romagn. 1979
- Inocybe striaepes Kühner 1988
- Inocybe striatiformis Murrill 1945
- Inocybe striatorimosa P.D.Orton 1960 – United Kingdom
- Inocybe striatula (Cleland) Grgur. 1997
- Inocybe strobilomyces E.Horak 1978
- Inocybe stuntzii Grund 1975
- Inocybe suaveolens D.E.Stuntz 1950
- Inocybe subalbidodisca Stangl & J.Veselský 1975
- Inocybe subannulata Kühner 1988
- Inocybe subargentea Singer 1938
- Inocybe subasterospora Cleland & Cheel 1918
- Inocybe subbrunnea Kühner 1955
- Inocybe subcarpta Kühner & Boursier 1932 – Europe
- Inocybe subconnexa Murrill 1945
- Inocybe subdecipiens Bres. ex Bellù, Bizio & M.Marchetti 1998
- Inocybe subdestricta Kauffman 1924
- Inocybe subeutheloides Murrill 1941
- Inocybe subexilis (Peck) Sacc. 1887
- Inocybe subfibrosoides Singer 1953
- Inocybe subfulva Peck 1888
- Inocybe subfulviforims Murrill 1945
- Inocybe subfulviformis Murrill 1945
- Inocybe subfusca Kühner 1988
- Inocybe subfuscocinnamomea Singer 1954
- Inocybe subgeophylla Henn. 1899
- Inocybe subgeophyllomorpha Singer 1954
- Inocybe subgigacystis Singer 1954
- Inocybe subhirsuta Kühner 1988
- Inocybe subhirtella Bon 1984
- Inocybe sublanuginosa Rick 1938
- Inocybe sublongipes Murrill 1945
- Inocybe submaculipes J.Favre 1960
- Inocybe submicrospora Velen. 1947
- Inocybe submuricellata G.F.Atk. 1918
- Inocybe subnodulosa Murrill 1941
- Inocybe subnudipes Kühner 1955
- Inocybe subochracea (Peck) Sacc. 1905
- Inocybe suboreina Moënne-Locc., Poirier & Reumaux 1990
- Inocybe subpaleacea Kühner 1988
- Inocybe subpelargonium Beller 1982
- Inocybe subporospora Kuyper 1986 – Italy
- Inocybe subprominens Murrill 1941
- Inocybe subradiata Murrill 1945
- Inocybe subroindica Banning & Peck 1891
- Inocybe subrubens Carteret & Reumaux 2012
- Inocybe subrubescens G.F.Atk. 1918
- Inocybe substellata Kühner 1988
- Inocybe substraminea Alessio 1980
- Inocybe substraminipes Kühner 1988
- Inocybe subtilis Takah. Kobay. 200
- Inocybe subtomentosa Peck 1897
- Inocybe subtrivialis Esteve-Rav., M.Villarreal & Heykoop 1997
- Inocybe subvatricosa Rick 1938
- Inocybe subvirgata Reumaux 2001
- Inocybe subvolvata Hongo 1963
- Inocybe sulcata Moënne-Locc., Poirier & Reumaux 1990
- Inocybe sulfovirescens Poirier 2002

== T ==
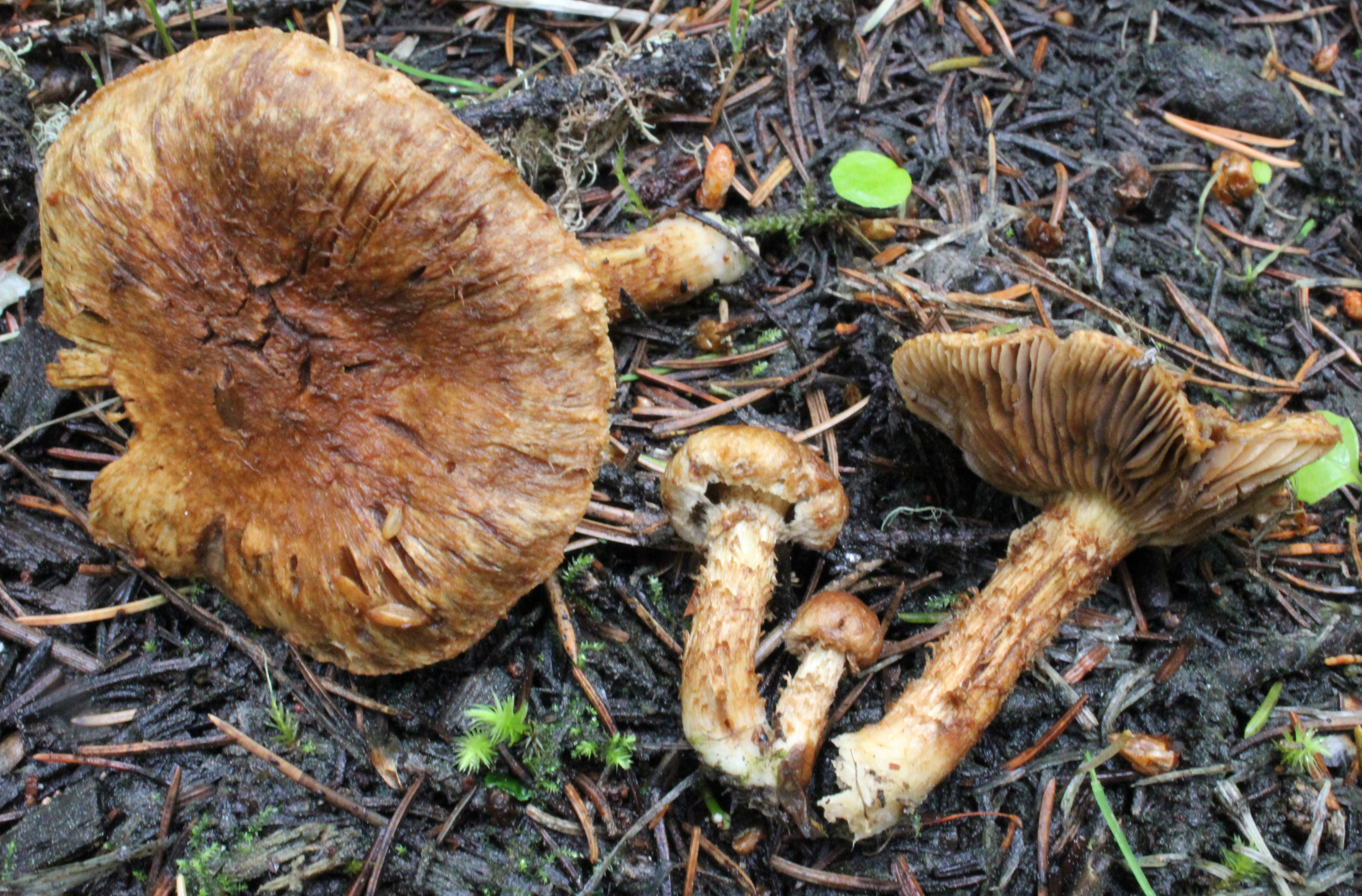
Inocybe terrigena

- Inocybe tabacina Furrer-Ziogas 1952
- Inocybe taedophila Murrill 1945
- Inocybe tahquamenonensis D.E.Stuntz 1954
- Inocybe tarda Kühner 1955
- Inocybe tauensis Kropp & Albee-Scott 2010
- Inocybe taxocystis (J.Favre & E.Horak) Senn-Irlet 1992
- Inocybe tenbricoides Kühner 1988
- Inocybe tenebrosa Quél. 1885 – Europe
- Inocybe tenerella (J.Favre) J.Favre 1960
- Inocybe tenerrima G.F.Atk. 1918
- Inocybe tequendamae Singer 1963
- Inocybe teraturgus M.M.Moser 1992
- Inocybe tetragonospora Kühner 1988
- Inocybe terrifera Kühner 1955
- Inocybe terrigena (Fr.) Kuyper 1985
- Inocybe texensis Thiers 1960
- Inocybe tigrina R.Heim 1931
- Inocybe tigrinella Carteret & Reumaux 2012
- Inocybe titibuensis Kobayasi 1952
- Inocybe tjallingiorum Kuyper 1986 – United Kingdom
- Inocybe tonalei Bizio & C.Rossi 2009
- Inocybe torresiae Matheny, Bougher & M.D.Barrett 2012
- Inocybe transiens Takah.Kobay. 2002
- Inocybe treneri Bres. 1926
- Inocybe tricolor Kühner 1955 (psychoactive)
- Inocybe tristis Hruby 1930
- Inocybe tropicalis Guzmán 1982
- Inocybe tubarioides G.F.Atk. 1918
- Inocybe tulearensis L.M.Dufour & H.Poiss. 1927
- Inocybe turfosa Velen. 1939

== U ==
- Inocybe uliginosa Velen. 1920
- Inocybe umboninota Peck 1885
- Inocybe umbratica Quél. 1884 – United Kingdom
- Inocybe umbrinescens Murrill 1945
- Inocybe umbrinodisca Kühner 1988
- Inocybe umbrinofusca Kühner 1988
- Inocybe umbrinovirens E.Horak 1979
- Inocybe umbrosa E.Horak 1978
- Inocybe undulatospora Kuyper 1989
- Inocybe unicolor Peck 1898
- Inocybe urbana Alessio 1980
- Inocybe urceolicystis Stangl & Vauras 1988
- Inocybe ursinella M.Lange 1957

== V ==
- Inocybe vaccina Kühner 1955 – United Kingdom
- Inocybe valida Malençon 1979
- Inocybe variabillima Speg. 1898
- Inocybe variispora Fernández Sas. 2002
- Inocybe vatricosoides Peck 1910
- Inocybe velata Franchi & M.Marchetti 2008
- Inocybe velenovskyi Boursier & Kühner 1928
- Inocybe velifera (Kühner) Bon 1997
- Inocybe ventricosa G.F.Atk. 1918
- Inocybe verbanensis Bon & E.Ferrari 2006
- Inocybe vialis Murrill 1945
- Inocybe vinosistipitata Grund & D.E. Stuntz 1983
- Inocybe violacea Massee 1899
- Inocybe violaceifolia Peck 1888
- Inocybe violaceoalbipes G.F.Atk. 1918
- Inocybe violaceocaulis Matheny & Bougher 2005 (prev. I. geophylla var. lilacina) In Western Australia, what represents I. violaceocaulis was earlier referred to as I. geophylla var. lilacina by some Australian taxonomists, which Matheny & Bougher (2005) point to as a misapplication of the name I. geophylla var. lilacina
- Inocybe violaceolamellata Rick 1930
- Inocybe violaceovelata E.Horak 1979
- Inocybe violeipes E.Horak 1979
- Inocybe virgata G.F.Atk. 1918
- Inocybe viridiumbonata Pegler 1983
- Inocybe viscidula R.Heim 1931
- Inocybe volvata D.E.Stuntz 1947
- Inocybe vulpina Takah. Kobay. 2002
- Inocybe vulpinella Bruyl. 1970

== W ==
- Inocybe weberi Murrill 1945
- Inocybe whitei (Berk. & Broome) Sacc. 1887 – Europe

== X ==
- Inocybe xantholeuca Kuyper 1986
- Inocybe xanthomelas Boursier & Kühner 1933 – United Kingdom
- Inocybe xerophytica Pegler 1983

== Z ==
- Inocybe zangherii Bres. 1930
- Inocybe zonatipes E.Horak 1979

== Literature ==
- Ferrari E. (2006). Inocybe Alpine e Subalpine. Fungi non Delineati (in Italian). Vol. 34–36. Alassio (Savona): Mykoflora. pp. 1–457. OCLC 612895570.
- Phillips R. (1981). Mushrooms and Other Fungi of Great Britain and Europe. London: Pan Books. ISBN 978-0-330-26441-9.
- Kobayashi T. (2002). The Taxonomic Studies of the Genus Inocybe. Beihefte zur Nova Hedwigia. Vol. 124. Berlin: J. Cramer. pp. 1–246. ISBN 978-3-443-51046-6.
- Outen AR, Cullington P (2012). Keys to the British Species of Inocybe (2.2 ed.). Outen & Cullington. pp. 1–73.
- Stangl J. (2013) [2011]. The Genus Inocybe in Bavaria. Summerfeld Books. pp. 1–344. ISBN 978-0-9569321-0-5.
