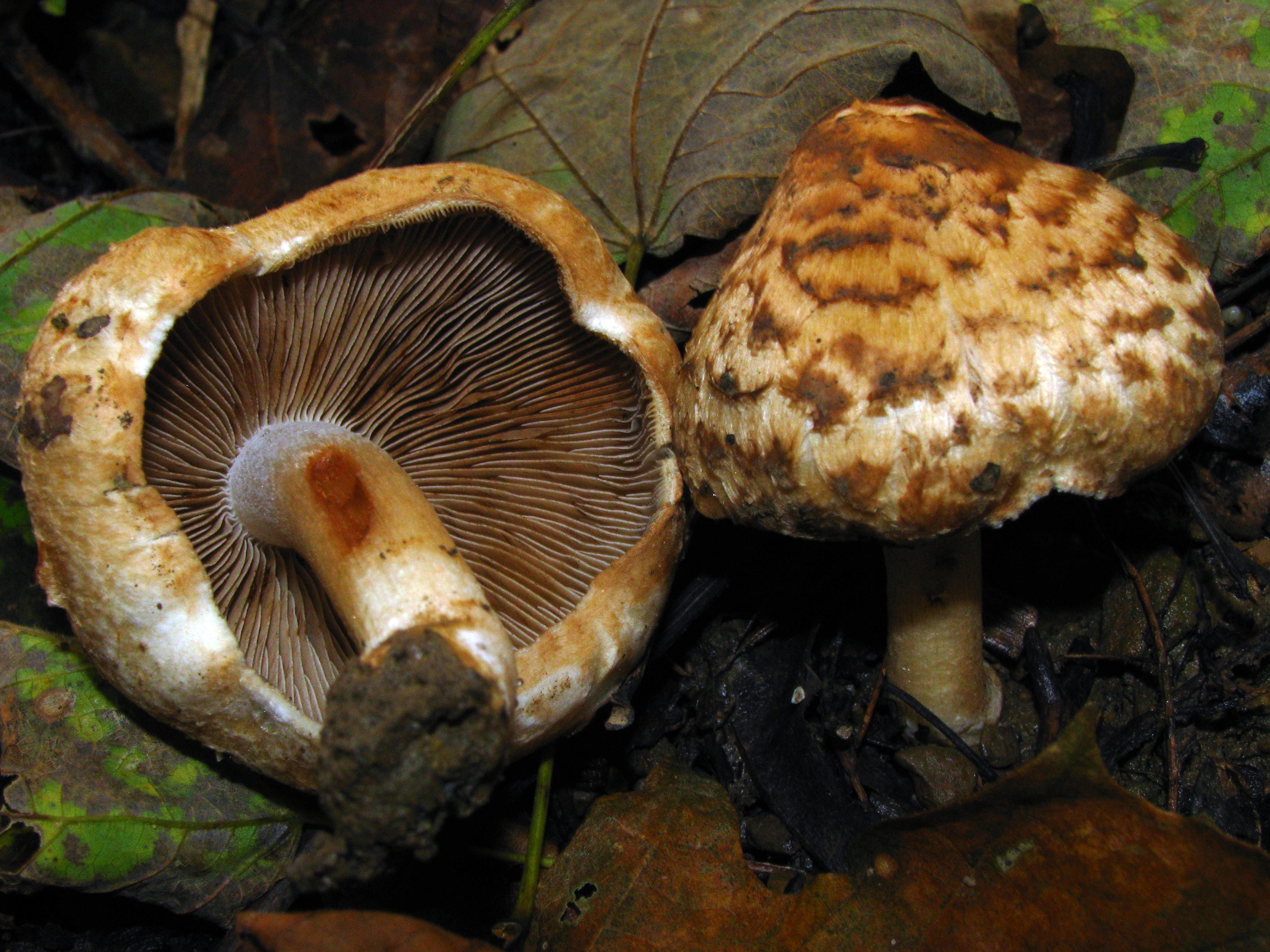

Scientific classification
- Kingdom: Fungi
- Division: Basidiomycota
- Class: Agaricomycetes
- Order: Agaricales
- Family: Inocybaceae
- Genus: Inocybe
- Species: I. fraudans

Binomial name
- Inocybe fraudans (Britzelm.) Sacc. (1887)

Synonyms
- Agaricus fraudans Britzelm. (1882); Inocybe corydalina var. albidopallens J.E.Lange (1940); Inocybe fraudans var. capitatocystidiosa A.Ortega & Esteve-Rav. (1989); Inocybe fraudans var. chamaesalicis Bon ex Jacobsson (2008)

= Inocybe fraudans =

Species of fungus

Inocybe fraudans, commonly known as the pear fibrecap, is an agaric fungus in the family Inocybaceae. It has a yellowish-brown fibrillose cap and stipe that develops reddish tints with age. The flesh has a characteristic odor, similar to jasmin or ripe pears, although the mushroom—like many in the genus Inocybe—is suspected to be toxic. It is found in Europe and North America, where it grows in woodlands. Fruitbodies produce an walnut-brown spore print, and have smooth, almond-shaped spores measuring 8–11.5 by 5–7 μm. Many authors have erroneously referred this species to Inocybe pyriodora.

== See also ==
- List of Inocybe species
