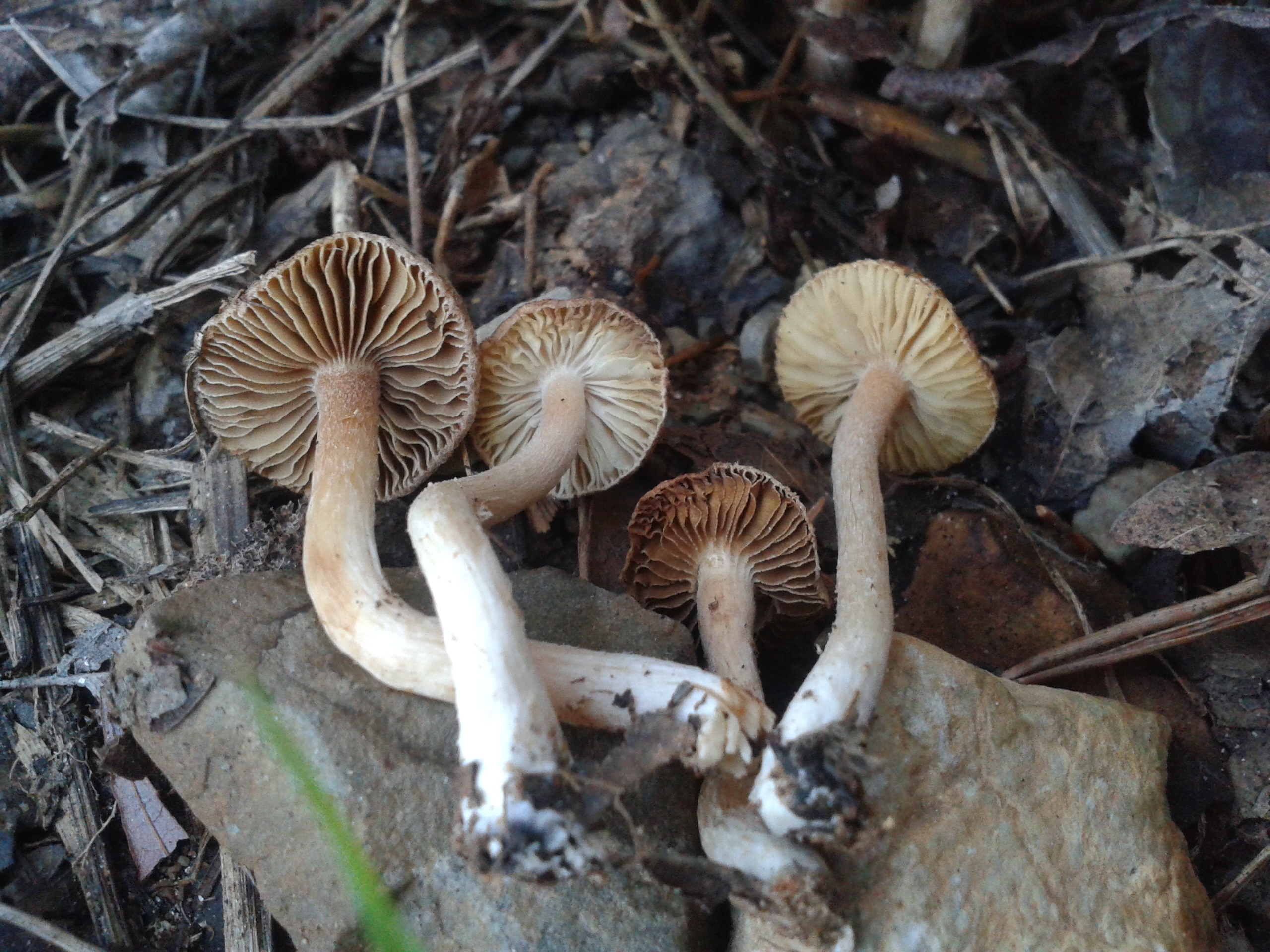

Scientific classification
- Kingdom: Fungi
- Division: Basidiomycota
- Class: Agaricomycetes
- Order: Agaricales
- Family: Inocybaceae
- Genus: Inocybe
- Species: I. griseolilacina

Binomial name
- Inocybe griseolilacina J.E.Lange (1917)

= Inocybe griseolilacina =

Species of fungus

Inocybe griseolilacina Mycological characteristics
- Gills on hymenium
- Cap is convex or flat
- Hymenium is adnexed
- Stipe has a cortina
- Spore print is brown
- Ecology is mycorrhizal
- Edibility is inedible

Inocybe griseolilacina, commonly known as the lilac leg fibrecap, is a mushroom in the family Inocybaceae. It was described scientifically by Danish mycologist Jakob Emanuel Lange in 1917. It is inedible. Its distinguishing characteristic is its pale yellow-gray and scaly cap and its fibrillose lilac stipe.

Its flesh, cap and gills often have lilac hues, as its name suggests. Its cap measures 1.5-3 cm across and is initially convex before flattening out with a small bump in the middle (umbo). The stipe is covered by a white cortina, when young and is lilac-coloured, occasionally having a pinkish hue at the top. It measures 1.4-6.7 x 0.1-0.6cm and is composed of thread-like fibers. The gills are adnexed to slightly sinuate and wider in the middle. They are 0.15-0.5 cm broad, and start of pale, darkening to gray and finally to umber. The odour and taste is sperm-like.

The spores measure 8-11 x 4.5-5.5 μm and are almond shaped. The spore print is brown. The basidia have 4 spores each and are 26-33 x 8-10 μm. There are numerous pleurocystidia which measure 50-80 x 8-14 μm with 2 μm thick pale walls. They are variable in shape, ranging from spindle-shaped to utriform. The cheilocystidia are similar but less numerous. There are also numerous paracystidia which measure 7-10 x 5-7 μm, are club-shaped and have colorless, thin walls. Caulocystidia are absent. Clamp connections are present in all tissues.

It is an ectomycorrhizal species, growing in association with a wide range of different tree species depending on the location, including conifer species in California, aspens in Montana and hardwood species in Europe. In Europe it mostly occurs on calcareous soils in deciduous woodland and scrub areas, often with species of Fagus and Corylus.

== See also ==
- List of Inocybe species
