= Inocybe tristis =

Scientific classification
- Domain: Eukaryota
- Kingdom: Fungi
- Division: Basidiomycota
- Class: Agaricomycetes
- Order: Agaricales
- Family: Inocybaceae
- Genus: Inocybe
- Species: I. tristis

Binomial name
- Inocybe tristis Malençon

Species of fungus

Inocybe tristis is a species of agaric fungus in the family Inocybaceae native to Israel. It is poisonous.

== See also ==
- List of Inocybe species
