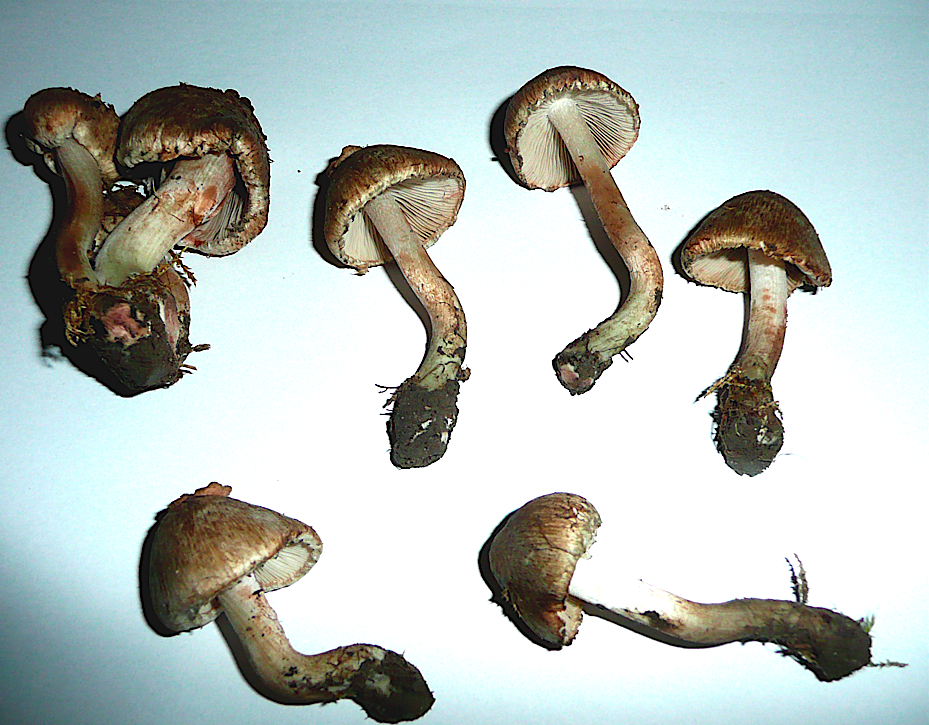

Scientific classification
- Domain: Eukaryota
- Kingdom: Fungi
- Division: Basidiomycota
- Class: Agaricomycetes
- Order: Agaricales
- Family: Inocybaceae
- Genus: Inocybe
- Species: I. haemacta

Binomial name
- Inocybe haemacta (Berk. & Cooke) Sacc. (1887)

Synonyms
- Agaricus haemactus Berk. & Cooke (1882); Inocybe corydalina f. haemacta (Berk. & Cooke) R.Heim (1931); Inocybe corydalina var. roseolus Pat. (1886); Inocybe haemacta var. rubra Rea (1922)

= Inocybe haemacta =

Species of fungus

Inocybe haemacta is a species of fungus in the genus Inocybe. It is found in Europe.

== Biochemistry ==
Inocybe haemacta contains the compounds psilocybin and psilocin.

== See also ==
- List of Inocybe species
- List of Psilocybin mushrooms
