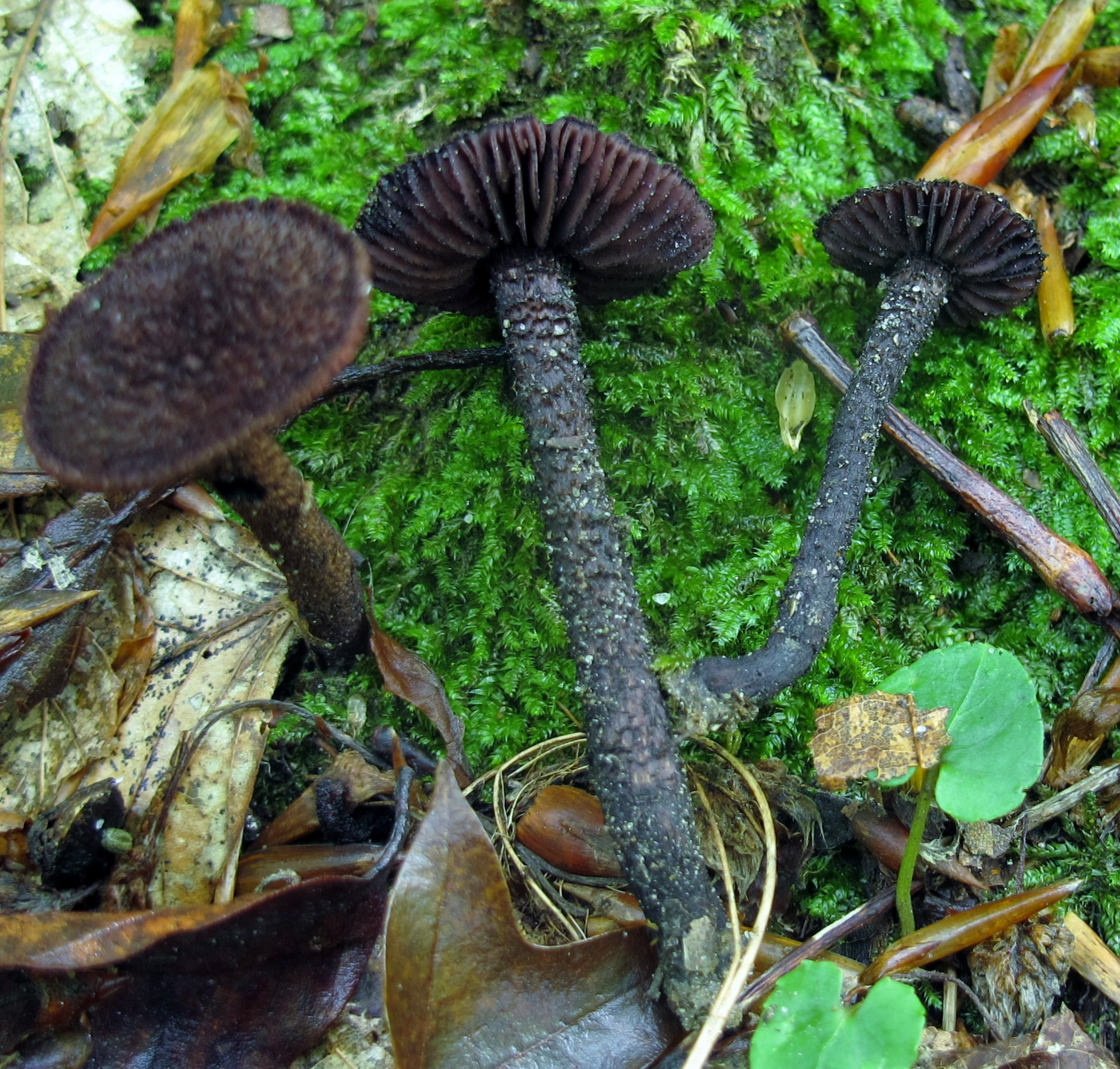

Scientific classification
- Domain: Eukaryota
- Kingdom: Fungi
- Division: Basidiomycota
- Class: Agaricomycetes
- Order: Agaricales
- Family: Inocybaceae
- Genus: Inocybe
- Species: I. tahquamenonensis

Binomial name
- Inocybe tahquamenonensis D.E.Stuntz (1954)

= Inocybe tahquamenonensis =

Species of fungus

Inocybe tahquamenonensis is an inedible species of agaric fungus in the family Inocybaceae. It was formally described in 1954 by mycologist Daniel E. Stuntz.

The fruit bodies have bell-shaped to convex to flattened caps measuring 1.2–3 cm (1/2–1 1/4 in) in diameter. Its color is dark purplish brown to reddish- or blackish-brown, with reddish-purple flesh. The gills are attached to the stipe and are somewhat distantly spaced. They are initially reddish brown before turning to chocolate brown, sometimes developing whitish edges. The spore print is brown; spores measure 6–8.5 by 5–6 μm.

Fruit bodies grow singly, scattered, or in groups under deciduous trees in the United States.

== See also ==
- List of Inocybe species
