= Inocybe violaceocaulis =

Scientific classification
- Kingdom: Fungi
- Division: Basidiomycota
- Class: Agaricomycetes
- Order: Agaricales
- Family: Inocybaceae
- Genus: Inocybe
- Species: I. violaceocaulis

Binomial name
- Inocybe violaceocaulis Matheny & Bougher

Species of fungus

Inocybe violaceocaulis is a species of mushroom native to Western Australia. Collections had been previously classified as I. geophylla var. lilacina.
