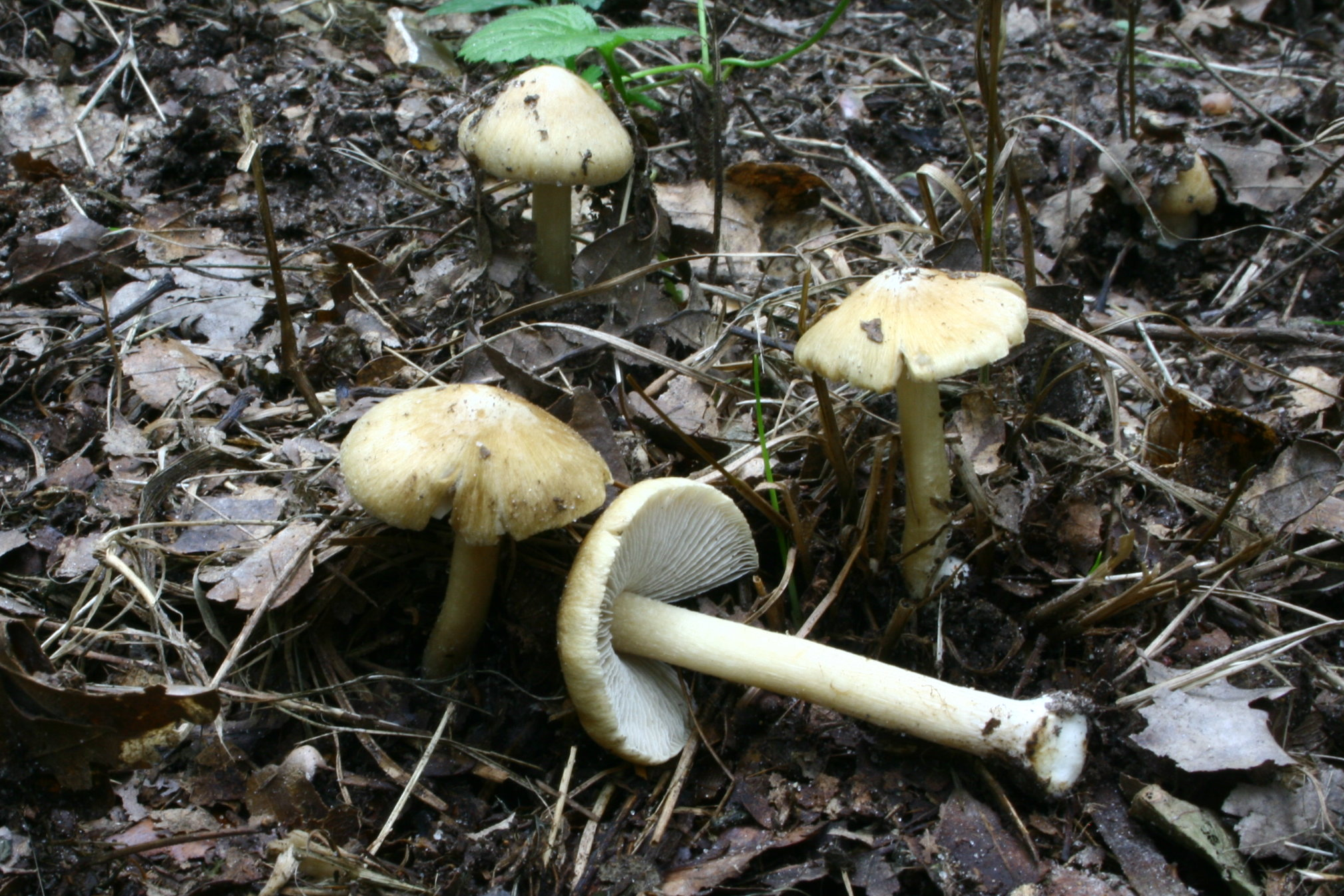

Scientific classification
- Kingdom: Fungi
- Division: Basidiomycota
- Class: Agaricomycetes
- Order: Agaricales
- Family: Inocybaceae
- Genus: Inosperma
- Species: I. cookei

Binomial name
- Inosperma cookei (Bres.) Matheny & Esteve-Rav., 2019

Synonyms
- Inocybe cookeiBres; Inocybe kuthanii Stangl & J.Veselský; Inocybe cookei var. kuthanii (Stangl & J.Veselský) Kuyper

= Inosperma cookei =

Species of fungus

Inosperma cookei
- Mycological characteristics
- Gills on hymenium
- Cap is campanulate
- Hymenium is adnexed
- Stipe is bare
- Spore print is brown
- Ecology is mycorrhizal
- Edibility is poisonous

Inosperma cookei, commonly known as the straw fibrecap, is a species of mushroom in the family Inocybaceae. It was first described in 1892 by Giacomo Bresadola, and is named in honour of Mordecai Cubitt Cooke. The species is found in Europe, Asia, and North America. It produces small mushrooms of an ochre colour, with a prominent umbo, fibres on the cap and a distinctive bulb at the base of the stem. It grows from soil in mixed woodland, and is encountered in summer and autumn, though is not common. Ecologically, it feeds through use of ectomycorrhiza. Inosperma cookei has been described as both toxic and non-toxic, but either way, is not advised for consumption.

== Taxonomy and naming ==
- - - I. maculatum f. fulvum
    - I. maculatum
  - - I. cookei
    - I. quietiodor
  - - I. rhodiolum
    - I. adaequatum
    - I. erubescens

Phylogeny and relationships of I. cookei and related species in section Maculata based on ITS, large-subunit, and mitochondrial small-subunit rRNA sequence data.

Inocybe cookei was first described by Giacomo Bresadola in 1892; the specific epithet cookei honours the British mycologist Mordecai Cubitt Cooke. Mycologists J. Stangl and J. Veselský described Inocybe kuthanii in 1979, which was later described as a variety of Inocybe cookei (Inocybe cookei var. kuthanii) by Thom Kuyper in 1986, but MycoBank now lists both names as synonyms of I. cookei. The mushroom is commonly known as the straw fibrecap.

Within Inocybe, it is placed within the subgenus Inosperma, and was previously categorised within the section Rimosae. However, phylogenetic analysis has shown that section Rimosae as formerly defined does not form a monophyletic group (that is, descended from a single exclusive ancestor), and former Rimosae species are better grouped into two clades, Maculata and Rimosae. Phylogenetic analysis has placed the species in the clade Maculata. Other species joining I. cookei in the Maculata clade include I. maculata, I. quietiodor, I. rhodiola, I. adaequata, and I. erubescens.

A 2019 multigene phylogenetic study by Matheny and colleagues found that I. cookei and its relatives in the subgenus Inosperma were only distantly related to the other members of the genus Inocybe. Inosperma was raised to genus rank and the species became Inosperma cookei.

== Description ==
Inosperma cookei has a conical or bell-shaped cap of between 2 and 5 centimetres (0.79 and 1.97 in) in diameter. As the mushrooms age, the cap becomes flatter, and an umbo becomes prominent. The margin of the cap frequently cracks towards the centre. The cap is an ochre colour, and the upper surface is covered in long fibres. The silky fibres thickly cover the cap, starting and the centre and extending to the cap's margin. The species has a whitish or ochre stem of 30 to 60 millimetres (1.2 to 2.4 in) in height by 4 to 8 millimetres (0.16 to 0.31 in) in thickness. There is a distinctive marginate bulb at the base of the stem, and no ring. The flesh is white, becoming yellow with age. Inosperma cookei mushrooms have closely packed adnexed gills (gills that are attached to the stem only on part of their depth). Gills on young mushrooms are whitish, then become a grey-tinged pale ochre before becoming cinnamon yellow.

=== Microscopic features ===
Inosperma cookei leaves a snuff-brown spore print. The spores themselves are bean-shaped, measuring from 5.5 to 10 micrometres (0.00022 to 0.00039 in) by 4 to 6 micrometres (0.00016 to 0.00024 in). The walls of the spores (which are around 0.5 micrometres (2.0×10^{−5} in) thick) can be smooth or slightly wrinkled, and there is a distinct depression just above the hilum (the scar where the spore was once attached to the basidium). The basidia are four-spored, and the thin-walled, gill-edge cheilocystidia are pear-shaped.

=== Similar species ===
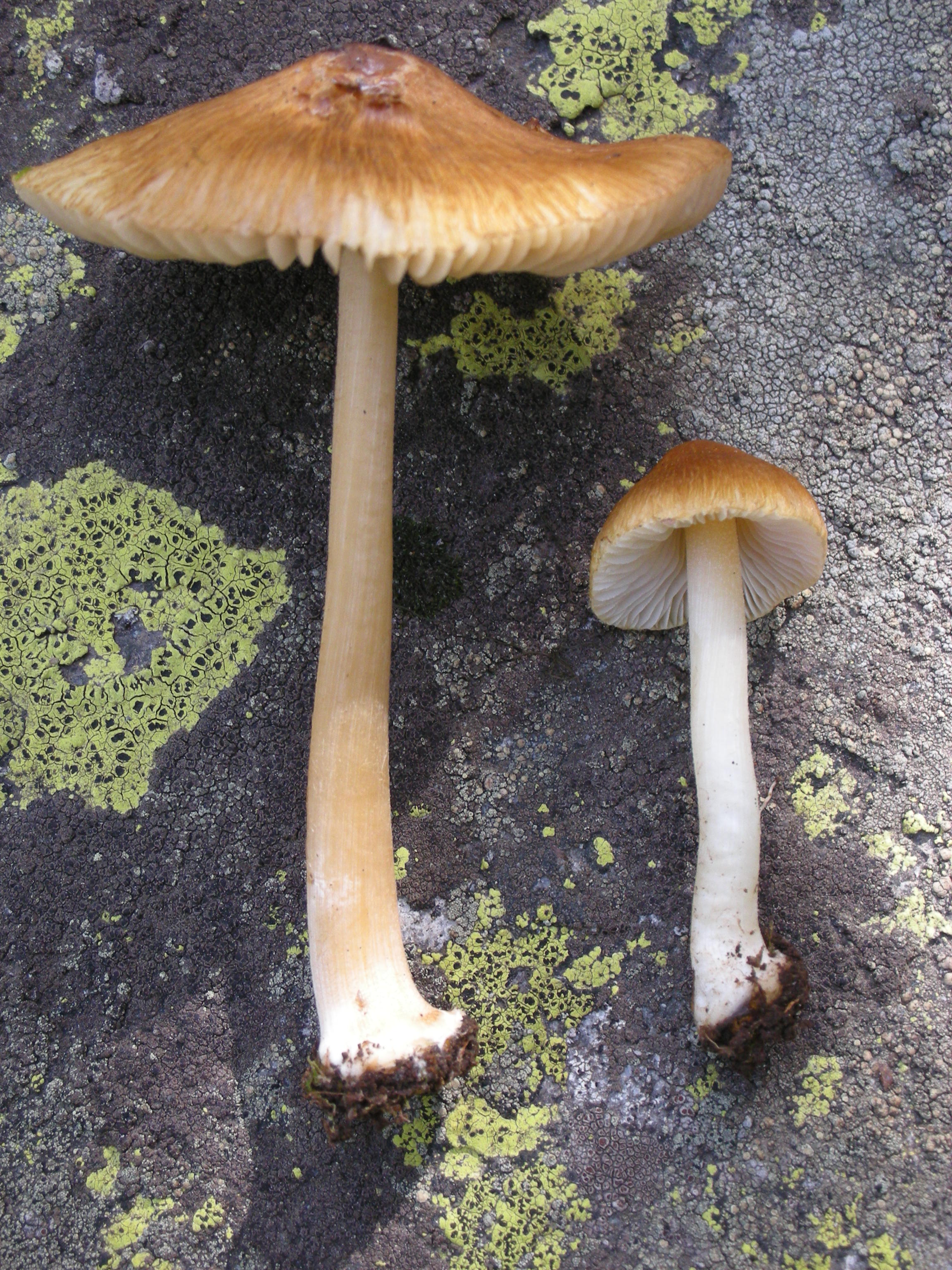
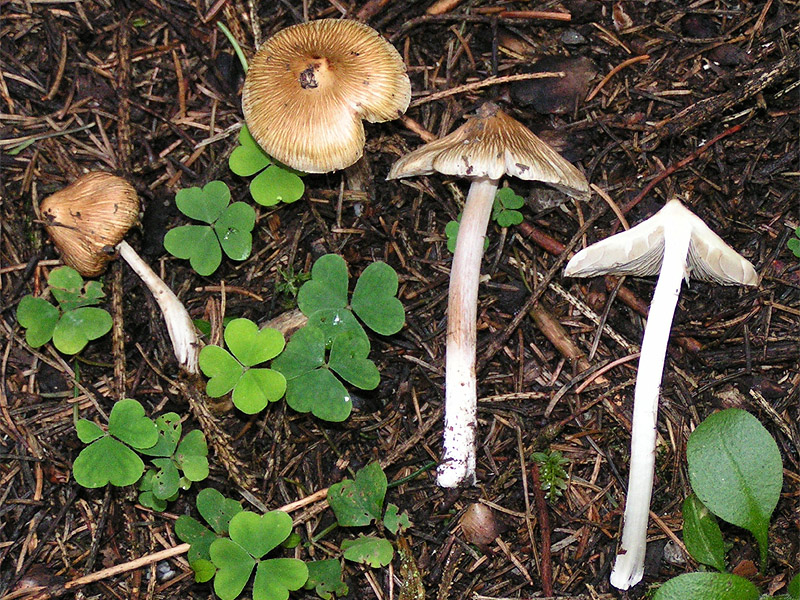
I. praetervisa (left) and I. rimosa (right) are lookalikes.

The species can be differentiated from the similar I. praetervisa by its spores; the latter "has irregular, lumpy spores". Inocybe rimosa, the split fibrecap, is also similar in appearance; the rarer I. cookei can be differentiated by the smell of honey and the marginate bulb. The colouration, as well as the thick stem with a bulb, are features shared by two other species of Inocybe; I. mixtilis and I. cryptocystis. Another fragrant Inocybe is I. pyriodora, which has an odor resembling cinnamon, or ripe pears in mature specimens; unlike I. cookei, it lacks a bulb at the base of its stem, and bruises a reddish colour when handled or with age.

== Distribution and habitat ==
Inosperma cookei is an occasional to frequent mushroom, found growing in mixed woodland on the ground. It is ectomycorrhizal, and grows from summer to late autumn, solitarily or in "trooping groups". It has been recorded in Europe, Russia, China, Mexico, and the United States.

== Toxicity and edibility ==
Inosperma cookei has been described as both poisonous (due to the presence of muscarine compounds) and non-toxic. Consumption of mushrooms containing muscarine compounds could lead to a number of physiological effects, including: excess salivation, lacrimation, uncontrolled urination or defecation, gastrointestinal problems and emesis (vomiting); this array of symptoms may also be known by the acronym SLUDGE. Other potential effects include a drop in blood pressure, sweating, and death due to respiratory failure. The flesh of the mushroom has a mild taste and a slight smell of honey. Regardless of its actual toxicity or edibility, it is considered "best avoided".

== See also ==
- List of Inocybe species
