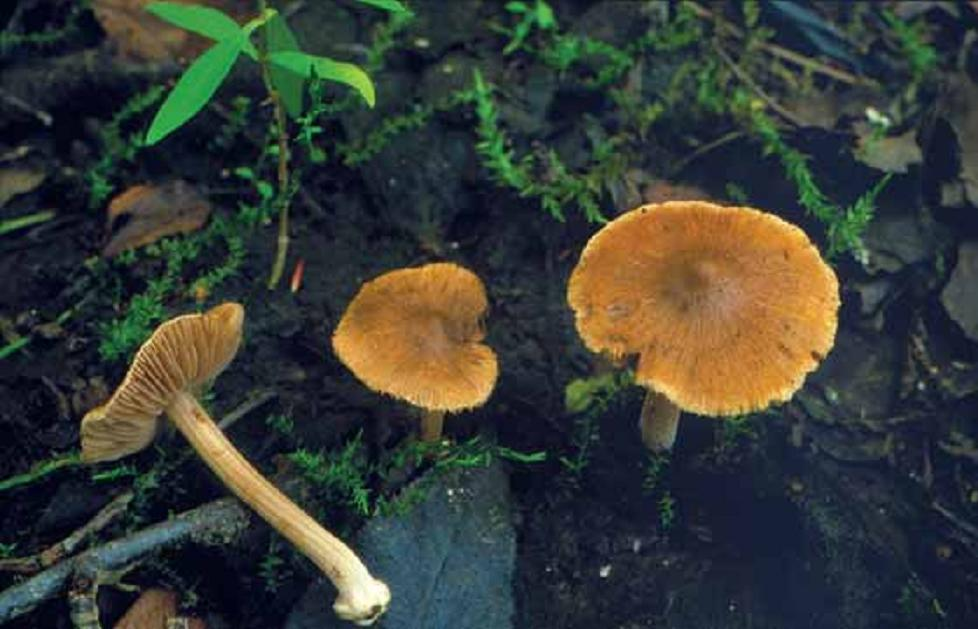
- The holotype, near Nurmes, Finland

Scientific classification
- Domain: Eukaryota
- Kingdom: Fungi
- Division: Basidiomycota
- Class: Agaricomycetes
- Order: Agaricales
- Family: Inocybaceae
- Genus: Inocybe
- Species: I. saliceticola

Binomial name
- Inocybe saliceticola Vauras & Kokkonen (2009)

= Inocybe saliceticola =

Species of fungus in the family Inocybaceae found in the Nordic countries

Inocybe saliceticola is a fungus found in moist habitats in the Nordic countries. The species produces brown mushrooms with caps of varying shapes up to 40 millimetres (1.6 in) across, and tall, thin stems up to 62 mm (2.4 in) long. At the base of the stem is a large and well-defined "bulb". The species produces unusually shaped, irregular spores, each with a few thick protrusions. This feature helps differentiate it from other species that would otherwise be similar in appearance and habit.

Inocybe saliceticola grows in mycorrhizal association with willow trees, and it is for this that the species is named. However, particular species favoured by the fungus are unclear and may include beech and alder taxa. The mushrooms grow from the ground, often among mosses or detritus. I. saliceticola was first described in 2009, and within the genus Inocybe, the species is a part of the section Marginatae. The species has been recorded in Finland and Sweden and is relatively common in some areas.

== Taxonomy ==
Inocybe saliceticola was first described in 2009 by Jukka Vauras and Katri Kokkonen in the journal Karstenia, based on around 20 specimens from Finland, the majority of which were collected by the authors. The holotype was collected from the shore of lake Pahakala, near Nurmes. The specific name saliceticola is in reference to the fact that the species grows among willow (Salix). Within the genus Inocybe, I. saliceticola belongs to the section Marginatae, as defined by Rolf Singer. The section has been defined in several ways. It was established in 1933 by Robert Kühner, who identified two key characteristics: a stem which does not feature a cortina (a fragile, cobweb-like partial veil) but is entirely covered by cystidia, and the presence of a marginate "bulb" at the base of the stem. Singer emended the section in 1986 to take into account that a bulb is not always present. A slightly different infrageneric taxonomy was offered by Thom Kuyper in 1986. He, like Singer, grouped Marginatae under Inocybe subg. Inocybe, but he labelled it a "supersection". However, phylogenetic studies have indicated that neither Singer's section Marginatae nor Kuyper's "supersection" Marginatae truly form monophyletic groups, but that Singer's section comes closer to doing so. Species within Marginatae similar to I. saliceticola include I. obtusiuscula, I. dunensis, I. salicis-herbaceae, I. substellata, I. praetervisa, I. salicis and I. mixtilis. These species are all known to associate with willow, and all have macroscopic similarities.

== Description ==
Inocybe saliceticola Mycological characteristics
- Gills on hymenium
- Cap is convex or umbonate
- Hymenium is adnate
- Stipe is bare
- Ecology is mycorrhizal

Incoybe saliceticola produces mushrooms with caps of between 7 and 40 millimetres (0.28 and 1.57 in) in diameter. The shape of the cap varies, depending on the age of the mushroom. In younger specimens, they are conical or nearly so, but as the mushroom matures, the caps flatten into a more convex or flat shape. As such, the height of the cap varies from 4 to 11 mm (0.16 to 0.43 in). The cap features an umbo that is usually very prominent. Around the umbo, the cap surface is smooth, but towards the cap margin, the surface is defined by fibrils running from the margin towards the umbo. The cap sometimes splits along these. The cap's colour varies from yellow-brown to pale brown, and is palest at the margins. The umbo contrasts to this somewhat, being a grey-brown or red-brown. The slender stem measures from 0.7 to 6.2 centimetres (0.28 to 2.44 inches) long by 1.5 to 6.5 mm (0.059 to 0.256 in) thick. It thickens slightly towards the base, where it joins a large, well-defined "bulb" that can be up to 11 mm (0.43 in) across. Shallow grooves run up the surface of the stem, which is covered in a fine white powder. In one case, however, an atypical specimen was recovered with an almost completely smooth stem, free of striations or powder. The stem varies in colour, with whitish, pale yellow-brown, pale red-brown, pale brown and grey-brown all observed, while the base is white. No veil or ring is visible.

The fairly crowded gills are adnate, meaning that they attach to the stem through their entire depth. They are a pale grey to pale grey-brown when young, darkening to grey-brown as they mature. The gill edges, which are slightly fimbriate, are the same colour or paler. The flesh lacks any strong or distinctive smell or taste, and is described in the original description as "fungoid". In the cap, the flesh varies in colour from whitish to a pale brown-grey or pale yellow, while in the stem, it is the same colour as the stem surface or slightly paler.

=== Microscopic characteristics ===
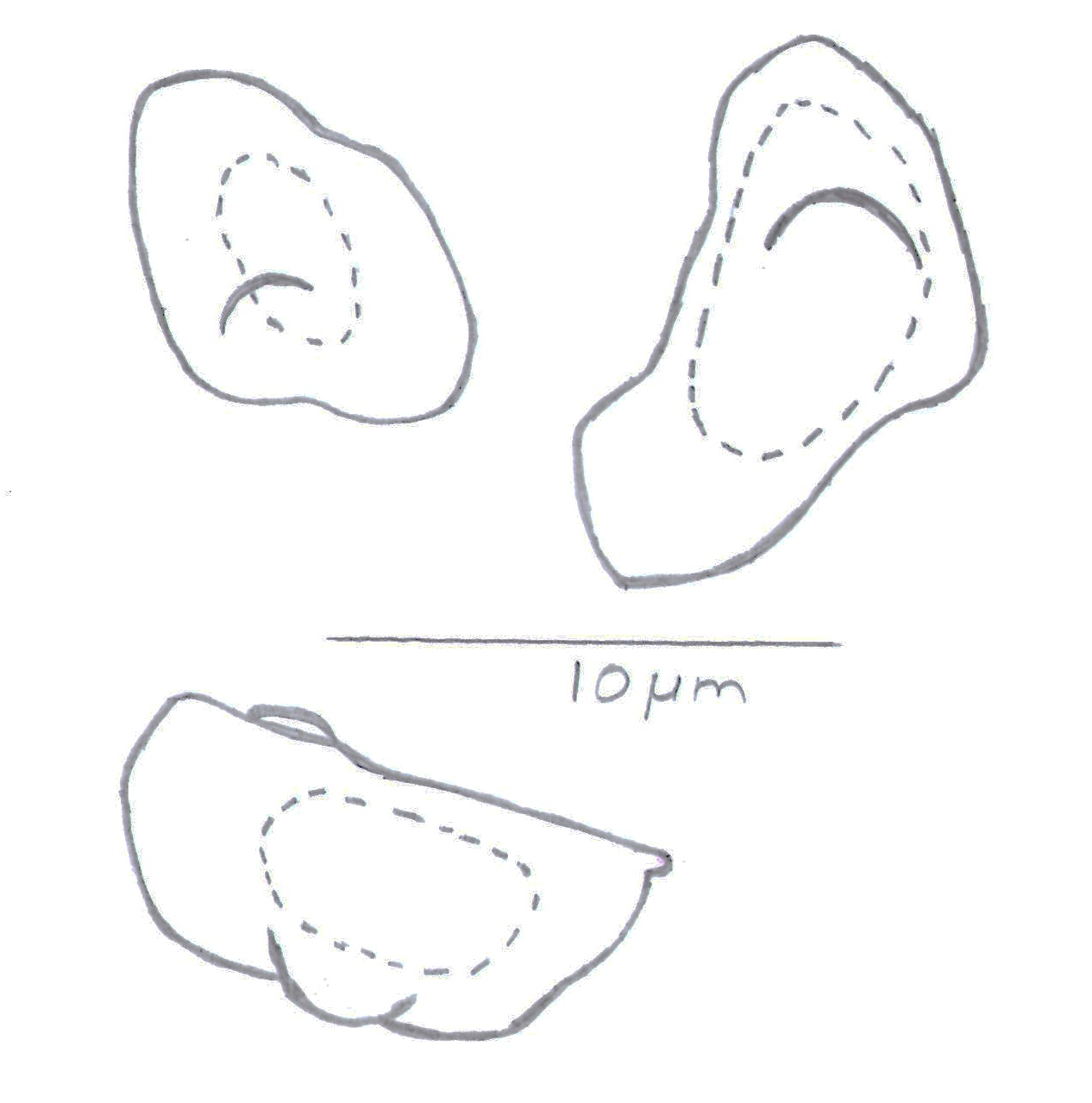
The distinctive spores of I. saliceticola. Note the irregular protrusions.

The irregularly shaped spores measure from 7.2 to 11.6 by 5.1 to 7.9 micrometres (μm), each featuring a few thick protrusions. Abnormal spores of a different shape, sometimes with protrusions more distinct from the actual spore than is typical, can sometimes form; this is perhaps due to poor weather. The club-shaped basidia measure 25 to 40 by 9 to 14 μm, and each basidium bears four spores. The yellowish pleurocystidia (cystidia on the face of the gill) are ventricose or occasionally club-shaped, measuring 41 to 89 by 12 to 23 μm, including a cell wall up to 4.5 μm thick. The tip often bends and is encrusted with crystal-like structures, while the base tapers, or narrows into a small stalk. The cheilocystidia (cystidia on the edge of the gill) are much the same, but they are typically somewhat shorter and stouter. The longer caulocystidia (cystidia on the stem) occur all the way down the stem and measure up to 99 μm in length with a more variable shape. The mushrooms also feature "paracystidia", club-shaped cystidia-like structures on the gills lacking crystals, as well as "cauloparacystidia" on the stem. In Inocybe saliceticola, the paracystidia are fairly abundant, with thin cell-walls, while the abundant cauloparacystidia can have slightly thicker walls and are often arranged in clusters.

=== Similar species ===
Of the species of Marginatae associated with willow, five (I. salicis-herbaceae, I. substellata, I. praetervisa, I. salicis and I. mixtilis) can be readily distinguished from I. saliceticola as their spores feature distinct, strongly protruding excrescences. In addition, they are found in vastly different habitats: I. mixtilis and I. praetervisa favour willow only in montane habitats, while I. salicis-herbaceae and I. substellata grow exclusively in montane habitats. I. salicis is rare in Nordic countries, and is typically collected from dunes. Of the other two listed by Vauras and Kokkonen, the spores of I. dunensis are distinctly larger and of a different shape to those of I. saliceticola, and the cystidia are shorter. While the species is typically found on the beach, it grows on fine sand, and has not been recorded in Finland. I. obtusiuscula also has larger spores of a different shape, and they are a darker colour, owing to their thick cell walls. Phylogenetic analysis of the respective internal transcribed spacer sequences has confirmed that I. obtusiuscula and I. saliceticola are separate species.

Inocybe alnea and I. ochracea, regarded by some as the same species, can also be distinguished from I. saliceticola by the presence of protruding nodules on the spores. DNA analysis confirmed that they were separate from I. saliceticola, and, in any case, it is possible that they do not grow in association with willow. I. hirculus has been recorded growing near I. saliceticola, but can be differentiated both macroscopically and microscopically; the mushrooms of I. hirculus have a much more fibrillose cap, and the stem does not join a bulb, while the spores are larger. Macroscopically, I. rivularis, which could grow in similar habitats to that of I. saliceticola, produces larger mushrooms and has powder only towards the top of the stem. It also differs microscopically.

== Distribution and habitat ==
I. saliceticola has been recorded in Finland and Sweden.

Inocybe saliceticola grows in a mycorrhizal association with willow (Salix). Precise favoured species are unclear; at least one of the tea-leaved willow (Salix phylicifolia) or the dark-leaved willow (S. myrsinifolia) is a possible symbiont, while other trees that the species has been found near include the bay willow (S. pentandra), the grey willow (S. cinnerea), the grey alder (Alnus incana) and species of birch (Betula). I. saliceticola is found most typically in moist thickets or woodland close to shores, but recordings have also been made in other moist habitats. Mushrooms are encountered on the ground, growing from detritus or amongst moss, such as the heart-leaved spear-moss (Calliergon cordifolium), the spiky-bog moss (Sphagnum squarrosum) and species of Mnium. They are typically near plants such as the tufted loosestrife (Lysimachia thyrsiflora), the creeping buttercup (Ranunculus repens), the common marsh-bedstraw (Galium palustre), the purple marshlocks (Comarum palustre) and the purple small-reed (Calamagrostis canescens), and share the habitat with other Inocybe, including I. acuta and I. lacera var. helobia.

Inocybe saliceticola has been recorded in several locations around Finland, ranging from the hemiboreal zones in the east and the south of the country, to boreal areas in the north, and it has also been found in Sweden, close to the Klarälven. At least in North Karelia, Finland, it is relatively common in the right habitats. It is one of over 150 species of Inocybe found in the Nordic countries, and fruit bodies can be encountered between late July and early October.

== See also ==
- List of Inocybe species
