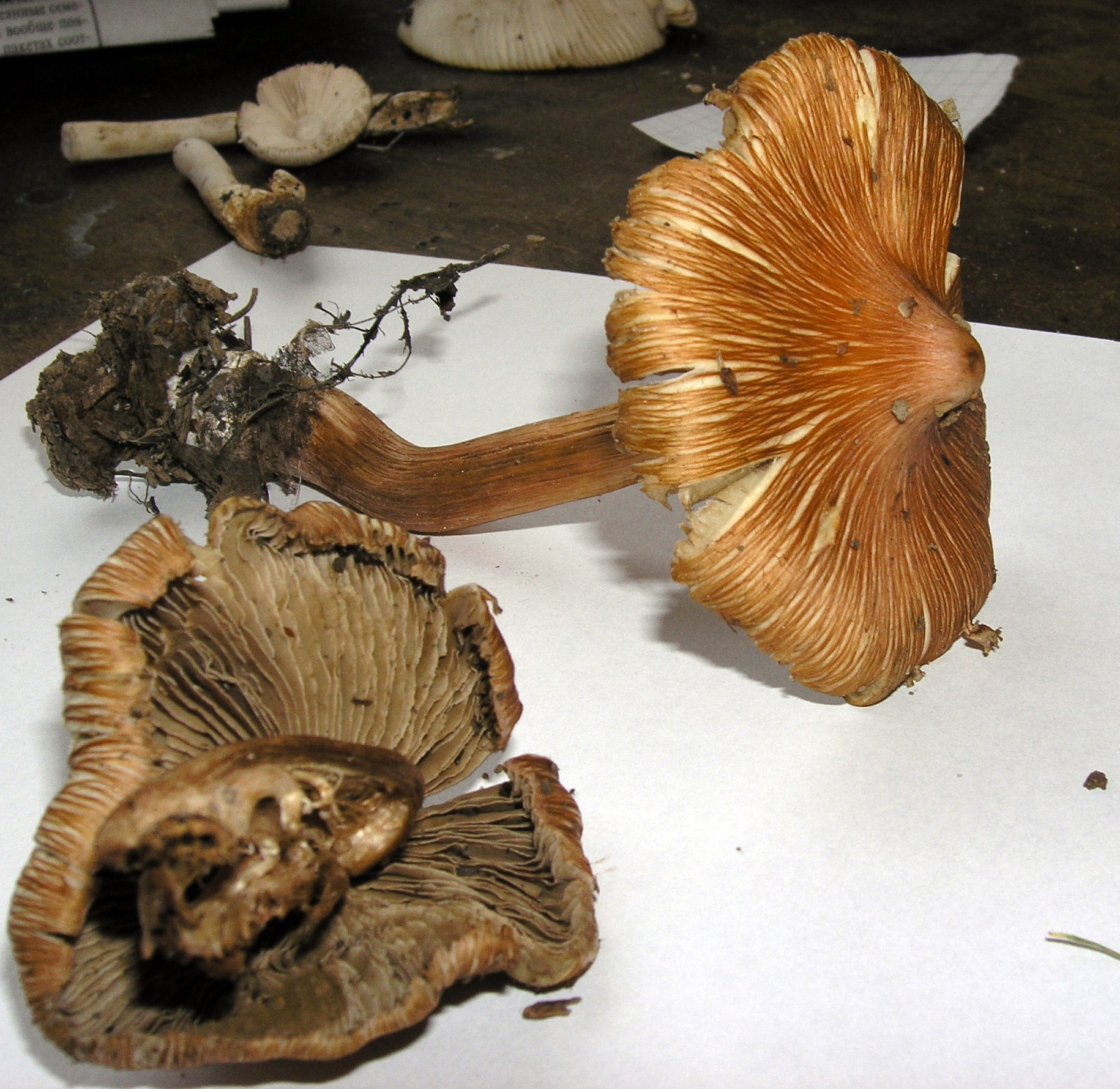

Scientific classification
- Domain: Eukaryota
- Kingdom: Fungi
- Division: Basidiomycota
- Class: Agaricomycetes
- Order: Agaricales
- Family: Inocybaceae
- Genus: Inocybe
- Species: I. godeyi

Binomial name
- Inocybe godeyi Gillet 1874

Synonyms
- Inocybe rubescens Gillet 1883; Agaricus trinii var. rubescens (Gillet) Pat. 1884; Inocybe godeyi var. rufescens Cooke 1909; Inocybe boltonii R.Heim 1931; Inocybe boltoni R.Heim 1931; Inocybe rickenii R.Heim 1931; Astrosporina boltonii (R.Heim) A.Pearson 1943

= Inocybe godeyi =

Species of fungus

Inocybe godeyi is a species of Inocybaceae fungus found in Europe. The species produces mushrooms with cone-shaped caps up to 5 cm (2 in) in diameter. The caps are cream, becoming browner, but they bruise red. The stem is up to 6 cm (2 in) long, and has a "bulb" at the base. The white flesh has a strong smell and an acrid taste. The mushrooms can be found on forest floors in autumn months; the species forms an ectomycorrhizal relationship to surrounding trees, favouring beech. I. godeyi is known to be poisonous, containing muscarine compounds, and consumption of the mushrooms can lead to SLUDGE syndrome. The species is sometimes mistaken for the deadly I. erubescens.

First described by Claude Casimir Gillet, the species retains the name which it was first given, but has a number of taxonomic synonyms. Its specific name honours Louis-Luc Godey. Within the genus Inocybe, it has been classified in a number of ways, but appears to form part of a clade (that is, a group sharing a common ancestor) with species including I. abietis, I. corydalina, I. agglutinata and I. pudica.

== Taxonomy and phylogeny ==
Inocybe godeyi was first described, and given its current name, by French botanist and mycologist Claude Casimir Gillet in his 1874 work Les Hyménomycètes ou description de tous les champignons (fungi) qui croissent en France. The specific name honours the French mycologist Louis-Luc Godey. British mycologist Mordecai Cubitt Cooke described a variety of the species, Inocybe godeyi var. rufescens, in a 1909 issue of the Transactions of the British Mycological Society. However, the name is now considered synonymous with Inocybe godeyi. A number of other names are recognised as synonymous. Gillet's own Inocybe rubescens, described in an 1883 issue of Revue Mycologique, is no longer seen as a separate taxon. The same is true of Narcisse Théophile Patouillard's 1884 description of I. rubescens as a variety of "Agaricus trinii", Agaricus trinii var. rubescens. Other synonyms include Roger Heim's 1931 Inocybe rickenii and Inocybe boltonii.

Within the genus Inocybe, I. godeyi has been classified in a number of ways. In 1986, mycologist Thom Kuyper placed the species in the supersection Marginatae (subgenus Inocybe), along with species including I. abietis, I. calospora and I. praetervisa. Rolf Singer considers Marginatae a section in subgenus Inocybe, but he placed I. godeyi in the section Geophyllinae (in the subgenus Inocibium) along with species including I. agglutinata and I. pudica. A 2002 phylogenetic study found that Singer's Geophyllinae is probably monophyletic (that is, the taxa all come from a common, recent ancestor) and suggested that I. godeyi forms a clade with species including I. abietis, I. corydalina, I. agglutinata and I. pudica. All species in the clade were "smooth-spored Inocybes with metuloid hymenial cystidia", but there were other species that fit that description, such as I. lacera, that were shown not to be a part of the clade.

== Description ==
Inocybe godeyi Mycological characteristics
- Gills on hymenium
- Cap is conical
- Hymenium is adnexed
- Spore print is reddish-brown
- Ecology is mycorrhizal
- Edibility is poisonous

Inocybe godeyi produces mushrooms each of which features a cap of 2 to 5 cm (0.8 to 2 in) across. The cap is initially cone-shaped, but expands outward, and flattens somewhat. In younger mushrooms, it is a cream colour, but as the fruit bodies mature, it changes to an ochre to tan colour; however, the cap can sometimes become entirely red, the colour it turns when bruised. The cap surface of younger specimens is smooth and silky. The surface of older caps becomes increasingly fibrous, and cracks often develop, beginning at the cap margin and moving towards the centre. There is usually a small umbo. The stem attaches to the center of the cap, and measures 40 to 60 mm (2 to 2 in) by 3 to 8 mm (0.1 to 0.3 in). Towards the base, the stem surface is covered in fine grains, and at the very base, there is an obviously defined "bulb". In colour, the stem is an off-white, becoming redder as the mushroom ages. The flesh is white, but gradually turns red when it is exposed. The gills begin as an off-white, but become gradually the colour of cinnamon. They are adnexed, which means that only part of the depth of the gills attaches to the stem, and crowded.

=== Microscopic features ===
Inocybe godeyi leaves a snuff-brown spore print, while the individual spores themselves are smooth and almond-shaped. The spores measure 9 to 11.5 by 5.5 to 7 micrometres. Each basidium bares four spores. Both the cheilocystidia (cystidia found on the edges of the gills) and the pleurocystidia (cystidia found on the faces of the gills) are spindle- or bottle-shaped, with some kind of encrustation at the tip. They have thick cell walls.

=== Similar species ===
It is sometimes mistaken for the deadly Inocybe erubescens. The rarer I. erubescens, like I. godeyi, bruises red, though it is lighter in colour to begin with. The most distinguishing feature is that I. erubescens lacks a bulbous base.

== Edibility ==
Inocybe godeyi flesh has a strong smell, which has been variously described as "unpleasant", "earthy or mealy", and "not distinctive". The flesh has an acrid taste. The mushrooms are known to be poisonous, containing toxic compounds of muscarine. Consumption of the mushroom could lead to a number of physiological effects, including: salivation, lacrimation, urination, defecation, gastrointestinal problems and emesis (vomiting); this array of symptoms is also known by the acronym SLUDGE. Other potential effects include a drop in blood pressure, sweating and death due to respiratory failure.

== Distribution and habitat ==
Inocybe godeyi can be found in Europe. It is found in deciduous woodland on the ground, particularly on chalky soil. The species is ectomycorrhizal, favouring beech. Mushrooms are encountered in the autumn months of August to November, solitarily or in "trooping groups". While the mushrooms can be locally common, the species is typically uncommon.

== See also ==
- List of Inocybe species
