= Inocybe salicis =

Scientific classification
- Domain: Eukaryota
- Kingdom: Fungi
- Division: Basidiomycota
- Class: Agaricomycetes
- Order: Agaricales
- Family: Inocybaceae
- Genus: Inocybe
- Species: I. salicis

Binomial name
- Inocybe salicis Kühner (1955)

Synonyms
- Inocybe straminipes Romagn. (1979)

Species of fungus

Inocybe salicis is an uncommon species of fungus found in association with willow in Europe. The species produces small, brown or yellow mushrooms with caps up to 2.5 centimetres (1.0 in) across, with stems up to 3.5 centimetres (1.4 in) long. The species is similar in appearance to several other closely related species in the genus Inocybe that also associate with willow, and so is most reliably differentiated microscopically.

== Taxonomy and phylogeny ==
Inocybe salicis was described and named by Robert Kühner in 1955 in the Bulletin Trimestriel de la Société Mycologique de France. Inocybe straminipes is a synonym of I. salicis. The former was originally described in 1979 by Henri Romagnesi, and had different spores from those of I. salicis. However, the holotype was reexamined in 2009 by Ukka Vauras and Katri Kokkonen, who observed that the spores were in fact identical to those of I. salicis, which was described earlier, and so had precedence. The specific epithet salicis is in reference to Salix, the generic name for willow.

Within the genus Inocybe, I. salicis belongs to the section Marginatae, which also includes I. obtusiuscula, I. dunensis, I. salicis-herbaceae, I. substellata, I. praetervisa, I. saliceticola and I. mixtilis. These species are all known to associate with willow, and all have macroscopic similarities. As such, they are best differentiated microscopically.

== Description ==
Inocybe salicis Mycological characteristics
- Gills on hymenium
- Cap is campanulate
- Hymenium is adnexed
- Stipe is bare
- Ecology is mycorrhizal
- Edibility is unknown

Inocybe salicis mushrooms have tawny to yellowish-brown caps of between 1 and 2.5 centimetres (0.4 and 1.0 in) in diameter. Their surface can be cracked, covered in fibres or scaly. The caps change in shape as the mushrooms mature; while younger specimens have campanulate (bell-shaped) to conical caps, the caps of older specimens expand and flatten, with a broad umbo emerging. The cap cuticle forms a cutis. The gills are almost free, meaning that they only just connect to the stem, and are initially a pale grey, becoming an ochre-grey (or brownish) as they age. The stem has a white to honey-coloured surface entirely covered in powdery granules. The stem is 1.5 to 3.5 centimetres (0.6 to 1.4 in) long by 0.4 to 1 centimetre (0.2 to 0.4 in) thick. There is a well-defined "bulb" at the base of the stem. The white flesh smells spermatic, but the scent is not distinctive.

=== Microscopic characteristics ===
Inocybe salicis produces spores of 9 to 11 by 6 to 8 micrometers (μm). In shape, they are elongated or curved, but they are covered with 10 to 15 distinctive blunt, semi-circular projections. The cystidia on the face and edge of the gills measure 50 to 70 by 12 to 25 μm with a cell wall 2 to 3 μm thick, and either taper at each end, or are shaped like swollen bottles, with the cheilocystidia (cystidia on the gill edge) more variable. The circumcystidia (cystidia on the margin of the cap) are club- or balloon-shaped, and caulocystidia can be found all the way down the stem.

== Distribution and habitat ==
Inocybe salicis favours wet land in willow woodland and clearings. Although widespread throughout its range in Europe, it is not commonly encountered.

== See also ==
- List of Inocybe species
