= Auritella =

Scientific classification
- Kingdom: Fungi
- Division: Basidiomycota
- Class: Agaricomycetes
- Order: Agaricales
- Family: Inocybaceae
- Genus: Auritella; Matheny & Bougher (2006)

Type species
- Auritella dolichocystis Matheny, Trappe & Bougher ex Matheny & Bougher (2006)

Species
- A. arenacolens A. aureoplumosa A. chamaecephala A. dolichocystis A. erythroxa A. geoaustralis A. serpentinocystis

Synonyms
- Auritella Matheny & Bougher (2006)

Genus of fungi

Auritella is a genus of fungi in the family Inocybaceae. The genus contains seven species found in temperate Australia and tropical Africa. The genus was circumscribed in a 2006 publication by Brandon Matheny and Neil Bougher. The original publication, however, was later discovered to be invalid because they were unintentionally described as provisional names (nom. prov.) instead of new names (sp. nov.). The authors properly published the genus later that year.

In a 2019 molecular study, Matheny and colleagues used six genes to determine relationships within the family. They recovered Auritella as the sister to a lineage that gave rise to what was Inocybe subgenus Mallocybe (now Mallocybe) and Tubariomyces, while Inosperma (previously Inocybe subgenus Inosperma) was an earlier offshoot of the common ancestor of the three genera.

== Species ==
Name	Authority	Year	Distribution
A. arenacolens	(Cleland) Matheny and Bougher		Western Australia; South Australia
A. aureoplumosa	(Watling) Matheny		Cameroon
A. chamaecephala	Matheny, O.K.Mill. and Bougher		Western Australia
A. dolichocystis	Matheny, Trappe and Bougher		New South Wales, Australia
A. erythroxa	(De Seynes) Matheny		Gabon
A. geoaustralis	Matheny and Bougher		Western Australia
A. serpentinocystis	Matheny, Trappe and Bougher		New South Wales, Australia
