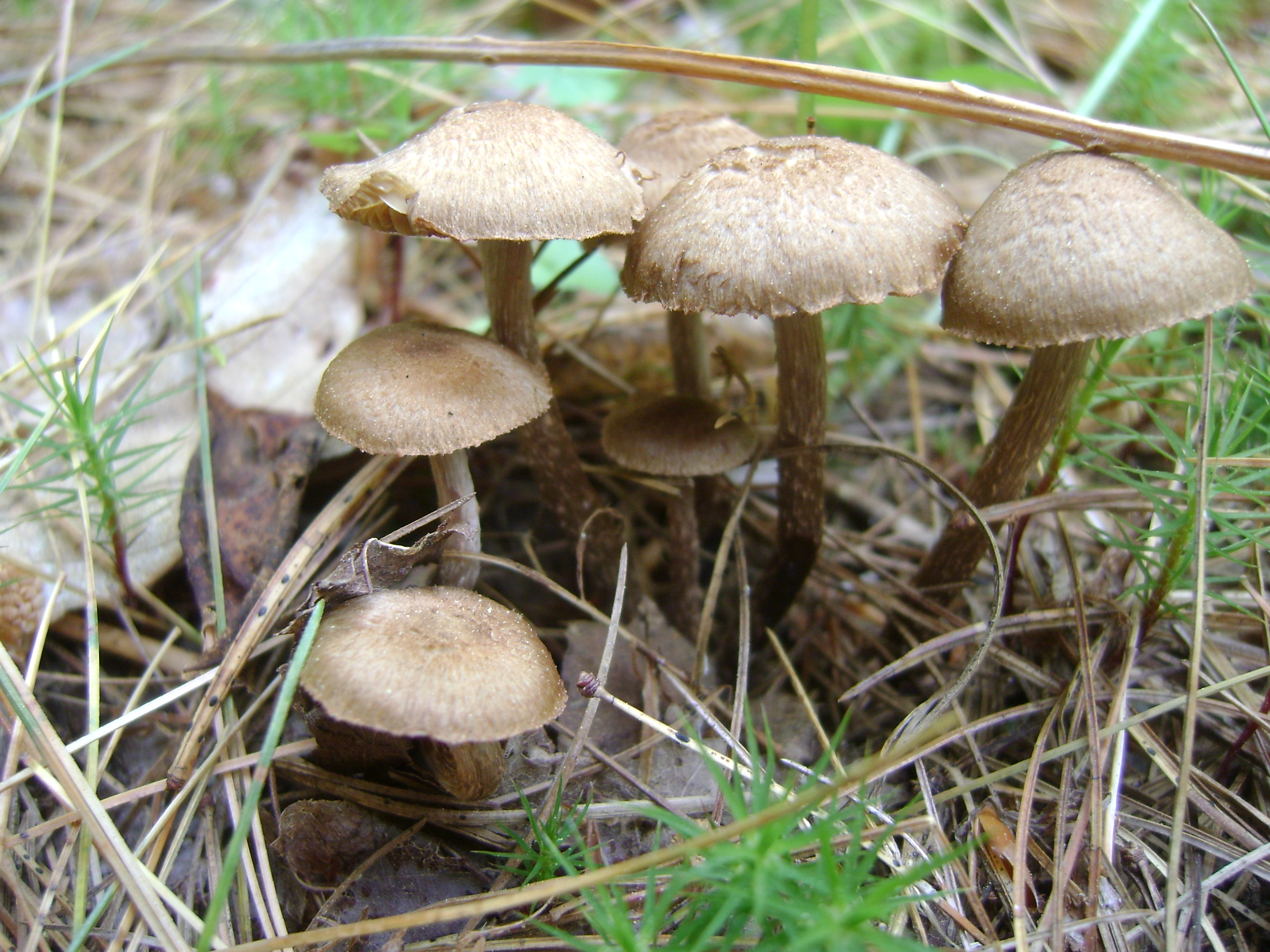

Scientific classification
- Kingdom: Fungi
- Division: Basidiomycota
- Class: Agaricomycetes
- Order: Agaricales
- Family: Inocybaceae
- Genus: Inosperma
- Species: I. calamistratum

Binomial name
- Inosperma calamistratum (Fr.) Matheny & Esteve-Rav.

Synonyms
- Inocybe calamistrata (Fr.) Gillet

= Inosperma calamistratum =

Species of fungus

Inosperma calamistratum
- Mycological characteristics
- Gills on hymenium
- Cap is campanulate or convex
- Hymenium is adnate or free
- Stipe is bare
- Spore print is brown
- Ecology is mycorrhizal
- Edibility is unknown

Inosperma calamistratum, until 2019 known as Inocybe calamistrata, is a species of Inocybaceae fungus.

The tannish cap is up to 5 centimetres (2 in) wide. The stem is up to 15 cm (6 in) long, possibly staining reddish above and/or blue-green below. The beige gills are fairly close and produce a brown spore print. The scent is typically pungent. Perhaps similar are Inocybe calospora, which does not stain, and I. tahquamenonensis, which is purplish.

The species is found in Europe and North America (July–September to the east; August–November by the West Coast).

Orson K. Miller Jr. and Hope Miller list the species as poisonous. It was suspected of being psychotropic because of the blue-green tinge present at the stipe base, with David Arora citing a study claiming to detect psilocybin. Later analysis did not find the mushrooms to contain psilocybin or similar alkaloids.
