= Neoclitocybe =

Scientific classification
- Domain: Eukaryota
- Kingdom: Fungi
- Division: Basidiomycota
- Class: Agaricomycetes
- Order: Agaricales
- Family: Tricholomataceae
- Genus: Neoclitocybe; Singer

Type species
- Neoclitocybe byssiseda (Bres.) Singer

Genus of fungi

Neoclitocybe is a genus of fungi in the family Tricholomataceae. The widespread genus contains 10 species that are especially prevalent in tropical regions.

== Species ==
As of July 2022, Index Fungorum accepted 23 species of Neoclitocybe.

1. Neoclitocybe aberrans Singer (1969)
2. Neoclitocybe alba Singer (1979)
3. Neoclitocybe alnetorum (J. Favre) Singer (1973)
4. Neoclitocybe byssiseda (Bres.) Singer (1962)
5. Neoclitocybe chortophila (Berk.) D.A. Reid (1975)
6. Neoclitocybe ciliata Singer (1989)
7. Neoclitocybe euomphalus (Berk.) Singer (1973)
8. Neoclitocybe infuscata Sá & Wartchow (2016)
9. Neoclitocybe irregularis (Rick) Singer (1962)
10. Neoclitocybe latispora Singer (1973)
11. Neoclitocybe lifotama Singer (1967)
12. Neoclitocybe membranacea Singer (1967)
13. Neoclitocybe microspora Singer (1969)
14. Neoclitocybe myceliosa Singer (1962)
15. Neoclitocybe nauseosa (Rick) Singer (1962)
16. Neoclitocybe nivea Singer (1962)
17. Neoclitocybe omphalina (Singer) Singer (1962)
18. Neoclitocybe portentosa Singer (1962)
19. Neoclitocybe sanctae rosae Singer (1989)
20. Neoclitocybe sublateralis Singer (1965)
21. Neoclitocybe subnimbata (Rick) Singer (1962)
22. Neoclitocybe substenophylla (Murrill) Singer (1962)
23. Neoclitocybe viridilutea (Rick) Singer (1973)

== See also ==
- List of Tricholomataceae genera
