= Neoclitocybe byssiseda =

Scientific classification
- Domain: Eukaryota
- Kingdom: Fungi
- Division: Basidiomycota
- Class: Agaricomycetes
- Order: Agaricales
- Family: Tricholomataceae
- Genus: Neoclitocybe
- Species: N. byssiseda

Binomial name
- Neoclitocybe byssiseda (Bres.) Singer

Synonyms
- 1907 Omphalia byssiseda Bres. 1953 Marasmiellus byssisedus (Bres.) Singer

Species of fungus

Neoclitocybe byssiseda is a species of fungus in the family Tricholomataceae, and the type species of the genus Neoclitocybe. Initially described as Omphalia byssiseda by Giacomo Bresadola in 1907, it was transferred to Neoclitocybe by Rolf Singer in 1961. The mushroom is edible.
