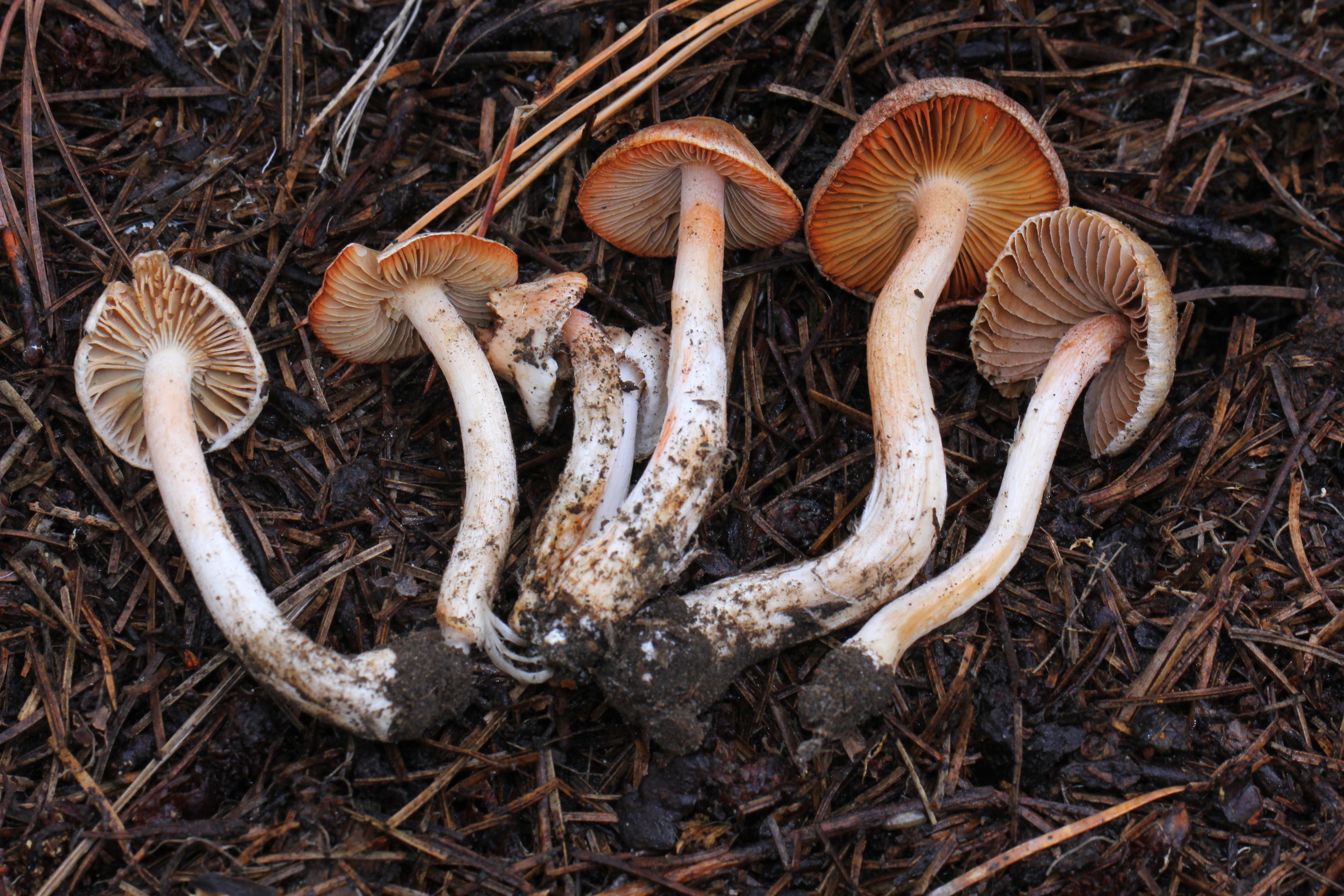

Scientific classification
- Kingdom: Fungi
- Division: Basidiomycota
- Class: Agaricomycetes
- Order: Agaricales
- Family: Inocybaceae
- Genus: Inocybe
- Species: I. whitei

Binomial name
- Inocybe whitei (Berk. & Broome) Sacc. (1887)

Synonyms
- Agaricus geophilus var. lateritius Berk. & Broome (1870); Agaricus whitei Berk. & Broome (1876); Agaricus flavidolilacinus Britzelm. (1891); Inocybe geophylla f. perplexa Kauffman (1925); Inocybe armeniaca Huijsman (1974); Inocybe pudica Kühner (1947)

= Inocybe whitei =

Species of fungus

Inocybe whitei
- Mycological characteristics
- Gills on hymenium
- Cap is campanulate or conical
- Hymenium is adnate or sinuate
- Stipe is bare
- Spore print is brown
- Ecology is mycorrhizal
- Edibility is poisonous

Inocybe whitei, also known as Inocybe pudica and commonly known as the blushing inocybe, is a species of agaric fungus in the family Inocybaceae.

== Taxonomy ==
The species was originally defined as Agaricus whitei by Miles Joseph Berkeley and Christopher Edmund Broome in 1876 and transferred to the genus Inocybe by Pier Andrea Saccardo in 1887. The species was also described independently as Inocybe pudica by Robert Kühner in 1947. Nowadays the two names are considered synonyms, with Berkeley and Broome's name taking precedence.

The epithet whitei was given in honour of Dr. Buchanan White, a naturalist of Perthshire.

== Description ==
The mushroom is initially white then develops reddish stains. The cap is 2–8 centimetres (1–3 in) wide and conical, then convex to flat with an umbo. The gills vary in attachment and are pallid at first, but darken with maturity. The spore print is brown.

The stalk is 4–8 cm long and 0.5–1 cm thick. The flesh has an unpleasant or spermatic odor. The spores are brown, elliptical, and smooth.

=== Similar species ===
Similar species include Inocybe adaequata, I. fraudans, and Hygrophorus russula.

== Toxicity ==
The species is considered poisonous as it contains muscarine.

== See also ==
- List of Inocybe species
