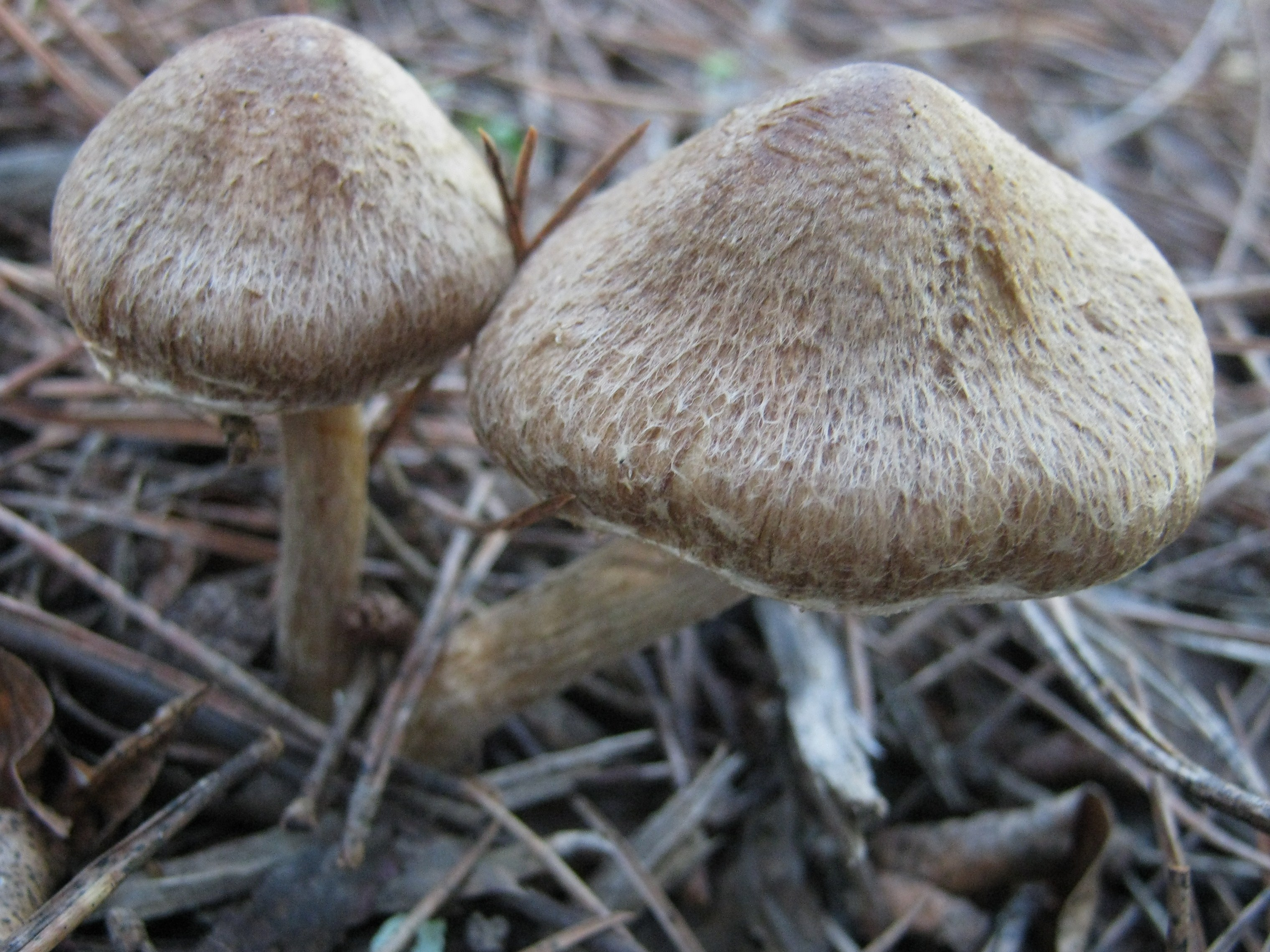

Scientific classification
- Kingdom: Fungi
- Division: Basidiomycota
- Class: Agaricomycetes
- Order: Agaricales
- Family: Inocybaceae
- Genus: Inosperma
- Species: I. bongardii

Binomial name
- Inosperma bongardii (Weinm.) Matheny & Esteve-Rav. (2019)

Synonyms
- Agaricus bongardii Weinm. (1836); Inocybe bongardii (Weinm.) Quél. (1872); Inocybe pisciodora Donadini & Riousset (1975); Inocybe bongardii var. pisciodora (Donadini & Riousset) Kuyper (1986)

= Inosperma bongardii =

Species of fungus

Inosperma bongardii is an agaric fungus in the family Inocybaceae. It was originally described as a species of Agaricus by German botanist Johann Anton Weinmann in 1836. Lucien Quélet transferred it to the genus Inocybe in 1872. A 2019 multigene phylogenetic study by Matheny and colleagues found that I. bongardii and its relatives in the subgenus Inosperma were only distantly related to the other members of the genus Inocybe. Inosperma was raised to genus rank and the species became Inosperma bongardii.

It is a common species with a widespread distribution. Fruit bodies grow on the ground, often in clay soils, and typically with broadleaf trees. The fruit bodies are suspected to be toxic, as they contain muscarine.

== See also ==
- List of Inocybe species
