= Inocybe ranunculiformis =

Scientific classification
- Kingdom: Fungi
- Division: Basidiomycota
- Class: Agaricomycetes
- Order: Agaricales
- Family: Inocybaceae
- Genus: Inocybe
- Species: I. ranunculiformis

Binomial name
- Inocybe ranunculiformis Sand.-Leiva, Caiafa & M.E.Sm.

Species of mushroom

Inocybe ranunculiformis is a species of fungus in the family Inocybaceae within the order Agaricales, native to Chile.

== Taxonomy ==
The species was first described by Pablo Sandoval Leiva, Marcos Vinicius Caiafa, and Matthew E. Smith in 2021, based on specimens from Cerro Cayumanque, Chile. The holotype is deposited in Chilean National Museum of Natural History.
