= Inocybe nahuelbutensis =

Scientific classification
- Kingdom: Fungi
- Division: Basidiomycota
- Class: Agaricomycetes
- Order: Agaricales
- Family: Inocybaceae
- Genus: Inocybe
- Species: I. nahuelbutensis

Binomial name
- Inocybe nahuelbutensis Caiafa & M.E.Sm.

Species of fungus

Inocybe nahuelbutensis is a species of fungus in the family Inocybaceae within the order Agaricales, native to Chile.

== Taxonomy ==
The species was first described by Marcos Vinicius Caiafa and Matthew E. Smith in 2021, based on specimens from Cordillera de Nahuelbuta, Chile. The holotype is deposited in Chilean National Museum of Natural History.
