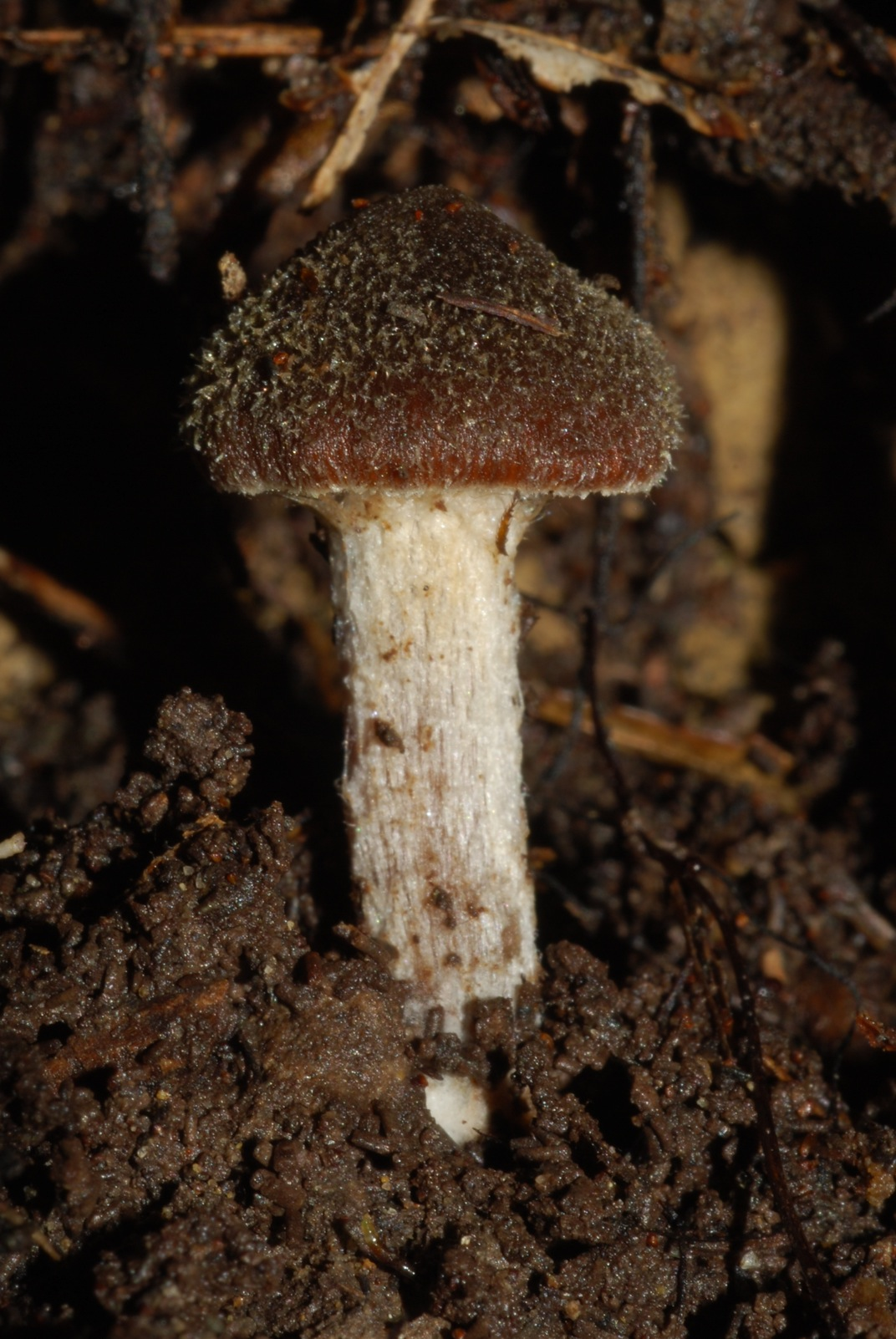

Scientific classification
- Domain: Eukaryota
- Kingdom: Fungi
- Division: Basidiomycota
- Class: Agaricomycetes
- Order: Agaricales
- Family: Inocybaceae
- Genus: Inosperma
- Species: I. calamistratoides

Binomial name
- Inosperma calamistratoides (E. Horak) Matheny & Esteve-Rav.

Synonyms
- Inocybe calamistratoides E. Horak

= Inosperma calamistratoides =

Species of fungus

Inocybe calamistratoides is a species of Inocybaceae fungus found in New Zealand.
