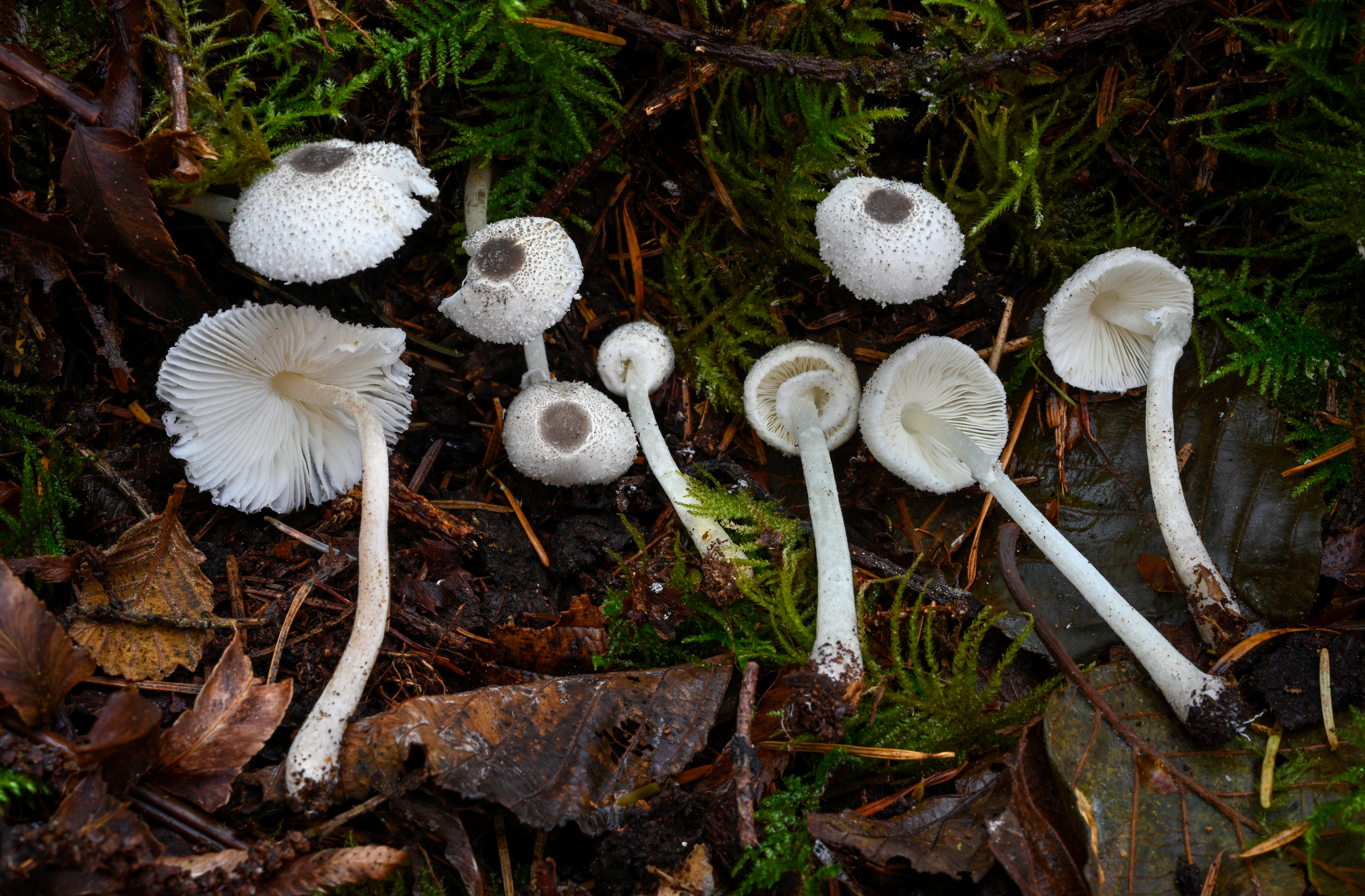
- Leucocoprinus brebissonii from Florence, Oregon, USA
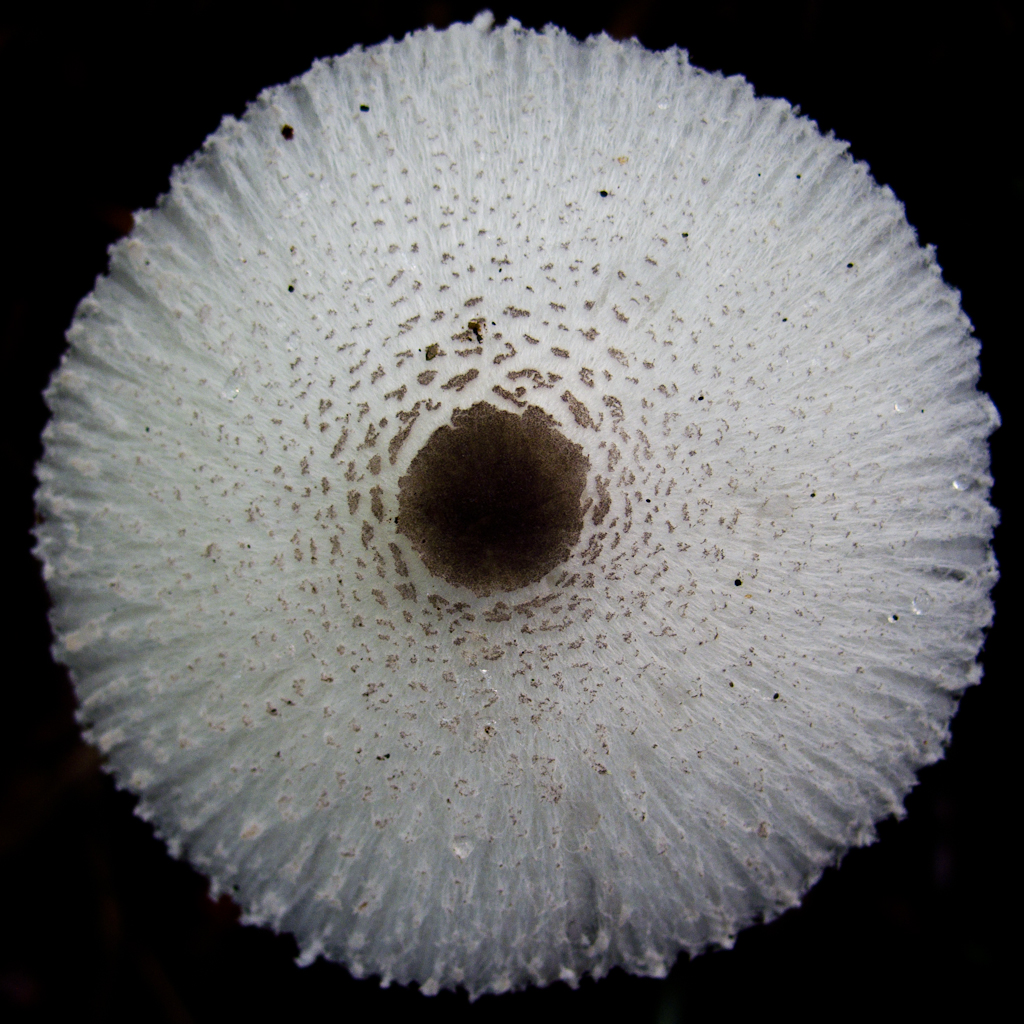
- Cap detail

Scientific classification
- Kingdom: Fungi
- Division: Basidiomycota
- Class: Agaricomycetes
- Order: Agaricales
- Family: Agaricaceae
- Genus: Leucocoprinus
- Species: L. brebissonii

Binomial name
- Leucocoprinus brebissonii (Godey) Locq. (1943)

Synonyms
- Lepiota brebissonii Godey (1874); Leucocoprinus otsuensis Hongo (1953); Lepiota otsuensis Hongo

= Leucocoprinus brebissonii =

Species of fungus

Leucocoprinus brebissonii
- Mycological characteristics
- Gills on hymenium
- Cap is campanulate or flat
- Hymenium is free
- Stipe has a ring
- Spore print is white
- Ecology is saprotrophic
- Edibility is unknown

Leucocoprinus brebissonii, commonly known as the gray-eyed dapperling, is a species of mushroom producing fungus in the family Agaricaceae. It is also known as the skullcap dapperling due to its distinctive pattern on the cap. This mushroom was only thought to be found in Europe but it has since been observed in the Pacific Northwest and may also be found in Asia.

== Taxonomy ==
Its description by the French mycologist Louis-Luc Godey, who classified it as Lepiota brebissoni, was first published in 1874. It was later reclassified as Leucocoprinus brebissonii in 1943 by the French mycologist Marcel Locquin.

In 1953 the Japanese mycologist Tsuguo Hongo documented a species from Ōtsu, Japan which he classified as Leucocoprinus otsuensis having previously classified it as Lepiota otsuensis. Hongo noted that the species was very similar to L. brebissonii but that it could be distinguished from it by the squamules (scales) on the cap. These may now be considered synonyms of Leucocoprinus brebissonii although some sources list Lepiota otsuensis as the current name.

== Description ==
Leucocoprinus brebissonii is a small, delicate mushroom with thin white flesh that is brittle and prone to splitting at the cap edges.

Cap: 2-3cm wide and starting hemispherical or bulbous before flattening with age with a small dark brownish umbo which is often quite shallow. The cap surface can be darker and brownish when young but as it opens the brown colouration breaks up and the surface lightens to white with fine brown scales radiating out from the centre and largely absent towards the edges. Distinct, deep striations or grooves spread from the edges of the cap to around halfway up the surface or almost to the disc. Gills: Free, crowded and white. Stem: 3-7cm tall and 3-6mm thick and roughly equal in thickness across its length or tapering slightly to the base, which can be bulbous but may not be as pronounced as in other Leucocoprinus species. The surface is smooth and white but may have a light brownish tint with age. The small, movable stem ring is usually located in the middle or towards the top of the stem however the ring is fragile and often peels away or vanishes. Spore print: White. Spores: Ellipsoid to amygdaloid with a germ pore. Dextrinoid. 8.5-10.5 x 5.5-6.5 μm. Smell: Indistinct. Taste: Indistinct.

== Distribution and habitat ==
Leucocoprinus brebissonii is found in Europe and North America from summer to fall, where it grows in the soil in woods with deciduous trees.

In 1874 Godey documented Lepiota brebissoni growing in the Cerisy Forest of the Calvados region of France during the summer. He noted that it was solitary and rare.

== Edibility ==
Unknown, but suspected to be poisonous.

== Similar species ==
The species resembles Lepiota atrodisca; the authors of one field guide speculate that L. brebissonii may have been mistakenly identified as this species, explaining why it was previously overlooked in North America.
