= Louis-Luc Godey =

French mycologist

- Born: 1813; France
- Died: 1873 (aged 59–60); France
- Citizenship: France
- Scientific career
- Fields: Mycology

Louis-Luc Godey (8 September 1813 in Saint-Lô - 17 February 1873) was a French mycologist known for his detailed illustrations of many European species of mushrooms.

He was the first to describe Lepiota brebissonii (later reclassified as Leucocoprinus brebissonii).

== Career ==
Godey was originally an art teacher. He later trained as a doctor and took up mycology as a hobby while practicing in Normandy, working with the naturalist Louis Alphonse de Brébisson. A collection of his watercolours of fungi are held at the science library of the University of Caen Normandy. The botanist Claude Casimir Gillet published Les Hyménomycètes de France in 1874, the year after Godey's death, using paintings of Godey's that he had gained access to. Mycologist Jean-Philippine Rioult at the University of Caen discovered that in some cases Gillet had copied, traced, and in some cases published Godey's work as his own, only acknowledging Godey as having collected the described new species.

== Works ==
- Quelques observations sur les lichens dans la Basse-Normandie.
- Quelques jalons pour un flore mycologique normande. 1871.
- Algues des environs de Falaise.1835. with Brébisson

== Legacy ==
The species Inocybe godeyi was named in his honour.
