= Karstenia (journal) =

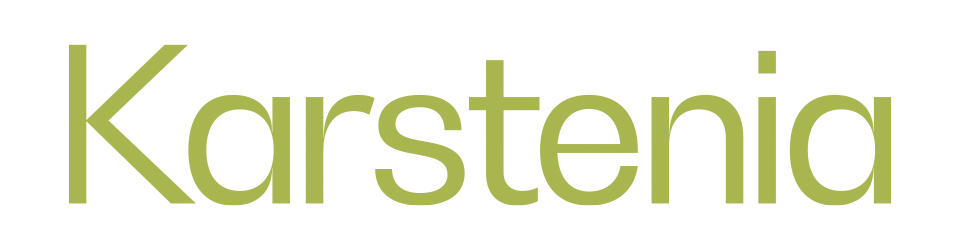
- Discipline: Mycology
- Language: English
- Edited by: Riikka Linnakoski

Publication details
- History: 1950–2026
- Publisher: Finnish Mycological Society (Finland)
- Frequency: Biannually
- Open access: Yes
- License: Creative Commons Attribution 4.0 International License

Standard abbreviations
- ISO 4: Karstenia

Indexing
- ISSN: 0453-3402
- LCCN: 84647010
- OCLC no.: 610448057

Links
- Journal homepage; Online archive

Karstenia was a biannual peer-reviewed open-access scientific journal covering all aspects of mycology, with an emphasis to boreal and arctic-alpine research, published by the Finnish Mycological Society. The journal offered full open access without article processing charges and has PDF archives of all historical issues. It was established in 1950 with varying frequency until 1976 when it switched to publishing two issues a year. The journal was named after the Finnish mycologist Petter Adolf Karsten and ceased publication in 2026.

== Abstracting and indexing ==
The journal is abstracted and indexed in BIOSIS Previews and Scopus.
