= Tubariomyces =

Scientific classification
- Kingdom: Fungi
- Division: Basidiomycota
- Class: Agaricomycetes
- Order: Agaricales
- Family: Inocybaceae
- Genus: Tubariomyces; Esteve-Rav. & Matheny

Type species
- Tubariomyces inexpectatus (M. Villarreal, Esteve-Rav., Heykoop & E.Horak) Esteve-Rav. & Matheny

Species
- T. hygrophoroides T. inexpectatus

Genus of fungi

Tubariomyces is a genus of fungi in the family Inocybaceae. The genus, circumscribed in 2010, contain two species known from Mediterranean Europe and possibly northern Africa.
