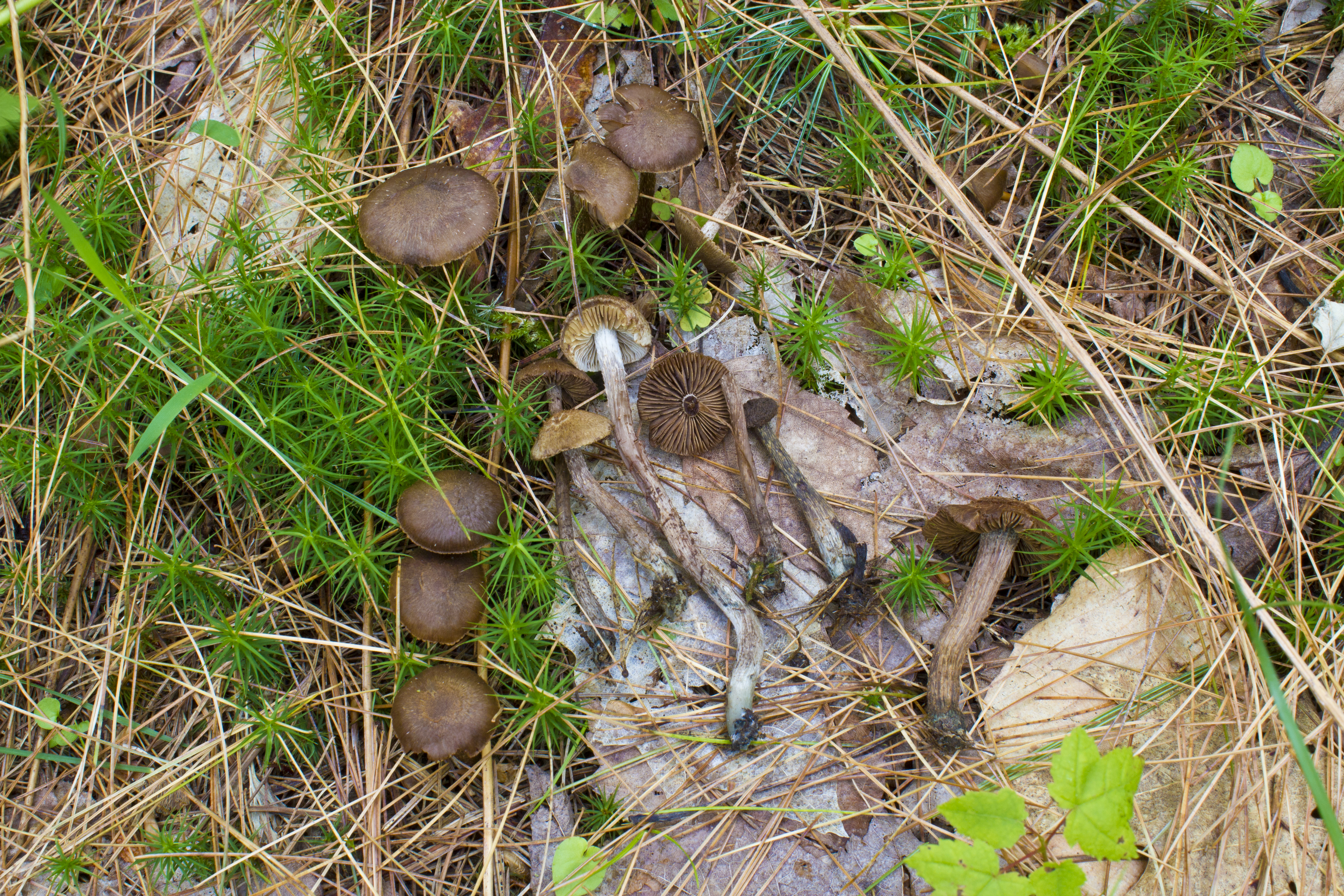
- Inosperma calamistratum

Scientific classification
- Domain: Eukaryota
- Kingdom: Fungi
- Division: Basidiomycota
- Class: Agaricomycetes
- Order: Agaricales
- Family: Inocybaceae
- Genus: Inosperma (Kühner) Matheny & Esteve-Rav.

Type species
- Inosperma calamistratum (Fr.) Matheny & Esteve-Rav.

Synonyms
- Inocybe subg. Inosperma Kühner, 1980

= Inosperma =

Genus of fungi

Inosperma is a genus of gilled mushroom in the family Inocybaceae. Previously defined as a subgenus within the large genus Inocybe by Robert Kühner in 1980, these fungi were found to be more distantly related in a 2019 multigene phylogenetic study by Matheny and colleagues.

== Description ==
This group of mushrooms was distinguished morphologically from other Inocybes by the absence of pleurocystidia and the shape of the spores. Also the stem is usually longer than the cap is wide and the cheilocystidia consist each of a single cell and are often so numerous that they make the gill edge white.

Inosperma is divided into two sections: Cervicolores (with a scaly cap) and Rimosae (with a radially fibrose or radially cracking ("rimose") cap). The former includes I. bongardii and I. calamistratum whilst the latter takes in I. cookei, I. erubescens, I. maculatum and I. rimosum.

== Species ==
As of December 2023, Index Fungorum lists the following species in Inosperma:

Image	Name	Taxon Author	Year
	Inosperma acutofulvum	(Bizio & Castellan) Bizio, A. Castellan & Cervini	2020
	Inosperma adaequatum	(Britzelm.) Matheny & Esteve-Rav.	2019
	Inosperma africanum	Aïgnon, Yorou & Ryberg	2021
	Inosperma afromelliolens	Eyssart. & Buyck	2021
	Inosperma akirnum	(K.P.D. Latha & Manim.) Matheny & Esteve-Rav.	2019
	Inosperma apiosmotum	(Grund & D.E. Stuntz) Matheny & Esteve-Rav.	2019
	Inosperma armoricanum	(R. Heim) Matheny & Esteve-Rav.	2019
	Inosperma aureostipes	(Kobayasi) Matheny & Esteve-Rav.	2019
	Inosperma bicoloratum	(E. Horak, Matheny & Desjardin) Matheny & Esteve-Rav.	2019
	Inosperma boeticum	Eyssart. & Buyck	2021
	Inosperma bongardii	(Weinm.) Matheny & Esteve-Rav.	2019
	Inosperma bulbomarginatum	Aïgnon, Yorou & Ryberg	2021
	Inosperma calamistratoides	(E. Horak) Matheny & Esteve-Rav.	2019
	Inosperma calamistratum	(Fr.) Matheny & Esteve-Rav.	2019
	Inosperma carnosibulbosum	(C.K. Pradeep & Matheny) Matheny & Esteve-Rav.	2019
	Inosperma cervicolor	(Pers.) Matheny & Esteve-Rav.	2019
	Inosperma changbaiense	(T. Bau & Y.G. Fan) Matheny & Esteve-Rav.	2019
	Inosperma chlorochroum	(Corriol & Guinb.) Matheny & Esteve-Rav.	2019
	Inosperma cookei	(Bres.) Matheny & Esteve-Rav.	2019
	Inosperma cyanotrichium	(Matheny, Bougher & G.M. Gates) Matheny & Esteve-Rav.	2019
	Inosperma dodonae	Bandini & B. Oertel	2021
	Inosperma erubescens	(A. Blytt) Matheny & Esteve-Rav.	2019
	Inosperma fastigiellum	(G.F. Atk.) Matheny & Esteve-Rav.	2019
	Inosperma flavobrunneum	Aïgnon, Yorou & Ryberg	2021
	Inosperma fulvoumbrinum	(Bres.) Matheny & Esteve-Rav.	2019
	Inosperma fulvum	(Bon) Matheny & Esteve-Rav.	2019
	Inosperma fuscospinulosum	(Corner & E. Horak) Matheny & Esteve-Rav.	2019
	Inosperma geraniodorum	(J. Favre) Matheny & Esteve-Rav.	2019
	Inosperma gregarium	(K.P.D. Latha & Manim.) Matheny & Esteve-Rav.	2019
	Inosperma griseolum	(Takah. Kobay.) Matheny & Esteve-Rav.	2019
	Inosperma hainanense	Y.G. Fan, L.S. Deng, W.J. Yu & N.K. Zeng	2021
	Inosperma hirsutum	(Lasch) Matheny & Esteve-Rav.	2019
	Inosperma insignissimum	(Romagn.) Matheny & Esteve-Rav.	2019
	Inosperma ionides	(Corner & E. Horak) Matheny & Esteve-Rav.	2019
	Inosperma ismeneanum	Bandini & B. Oertel	2021
	Inosperma kuthanii	(Stangl & J. Veselský) Matheny & Esteve-Rav.	2019
	Inosperma lanatodiscum	(Kauffman) Matheny & Esteve-Rav.	2019
	Inosperma latericium	(E. Horak) Matheny & Esteve-Rav.	2019
	Inosperma lilofastigiatum	(Stangl & J. Veselský) Matheny & Esteve-Rav.	2019
	Inosperma maculatum	(Boud.) Matheny & Esteve-Rav.	2019
	Inosperma maximum	(A.H. Sm.) Matheny & Esteve-Rav.	2019
	Inosperma misakaense	(Matheny & Watling) Matheny & Esteve-Rav.	2019
	Inosperma monastichum	Bandini & B. Oertel	2021
	Inosperma mucidiolens	(Grund & D.E. Stuntz) Matheny & Esteve-Rav.	2019
	Inosperma muscarium	Y.G. Fan, L.S. Deng, W.J. Yu & N.K. Zeng	2021
	Inosperma mutatum	(Peck) Matheny & Esteve-Rav.	2019
	Inosperma neobrunnescens	(Grund & D.E. Stuntz) Matheny & Esteve-Rav.	2019
	Inosperma pallidifolium	(Murrill) Matheny & Esteve-Rav.	2019
	Inosperma pisciodorum	(Donadini & Riousset) Matheny & Esteve-Rav.	2019
	Inosperma proximum	(E. Horak, Matheny & Desjardin) Matheny & Esteve-Rav.	2019
	Inosperma quercinum	(Hongo) Matheny & Esteve-Rav.	2019
	Inosperma quietiodor	(Bon) Matheny & Esteve-Rav.	2019
	Inosperma reisneri	(Velen.) Matheny & Esteve-Rav.	2019
	Inosperma rhodiolum	(Bres.) Matheny & Esteve-Rav.	2019
	Inosperma rimosoides	(Peck) Matheny & Esteve-Rav.	2019
	Inosperma rosellicaulare	(Grund & D.E. Stuntz) Matheny & Esteve-Rav.	2019
	Inosperma rubricosum	(Matheny & Bougher) Matheny & Esteve-Rav.	2019
	Inosperma saragum	(K.P.D. Latha & Manim.) Matheny & Esteve-Rav.	2019
	Inosperma shawarense	(Naseer & Khalid) Aïgnon & Naseer	2021
	Inosperma subhirsutum	(Kühner) Matheny & Esteve-Rav.	2019
	Inosperma submaculatum	Eyssart. & Buyck	2021
	Inosperma subrubescens	(G.F. Atk.) Matheny & Esteve-Rav.	2019
	Inosperma subsphaerosporum	Y.G. Fan, L.S. Deng, W.J. Yu & L.Y. Liu	2021
	Inosperma sulcatum	(Moënne-Locc., Poirier & Reumaux) Matheny & Esteve-Rav.	2019
	Inosperma tenerrimum	(G.F. Atk.) Matheny & Esteve-Rav.	2019
	Inosperma umbrinovirens	(E. Horak) Matheny & Esteve-Rav.	2019
	Inosperma veliferum	(Kühner) Matheny & Esteve-Rav.	2019
	Inosperma vinaceobrunneum	(Matheny, Ovrebo & Kudzma) Haelew.	2020
	Inosperma vinaceum	Cervini, M. Carbone & Bizio	2021
	Inosperma viridipes	(Matheny, Bougher & G.M. Gates) Matheny & Esteve-Rav.	2019
	Inosperma virosum	(K.B. Vrinda, C.K. Pradeep, A.V. Joseph & T.K. Abraham ex C.K. Pradeep, K.B. Vrinda & Matheny) Matheny & Esteve-Rav.	2019
