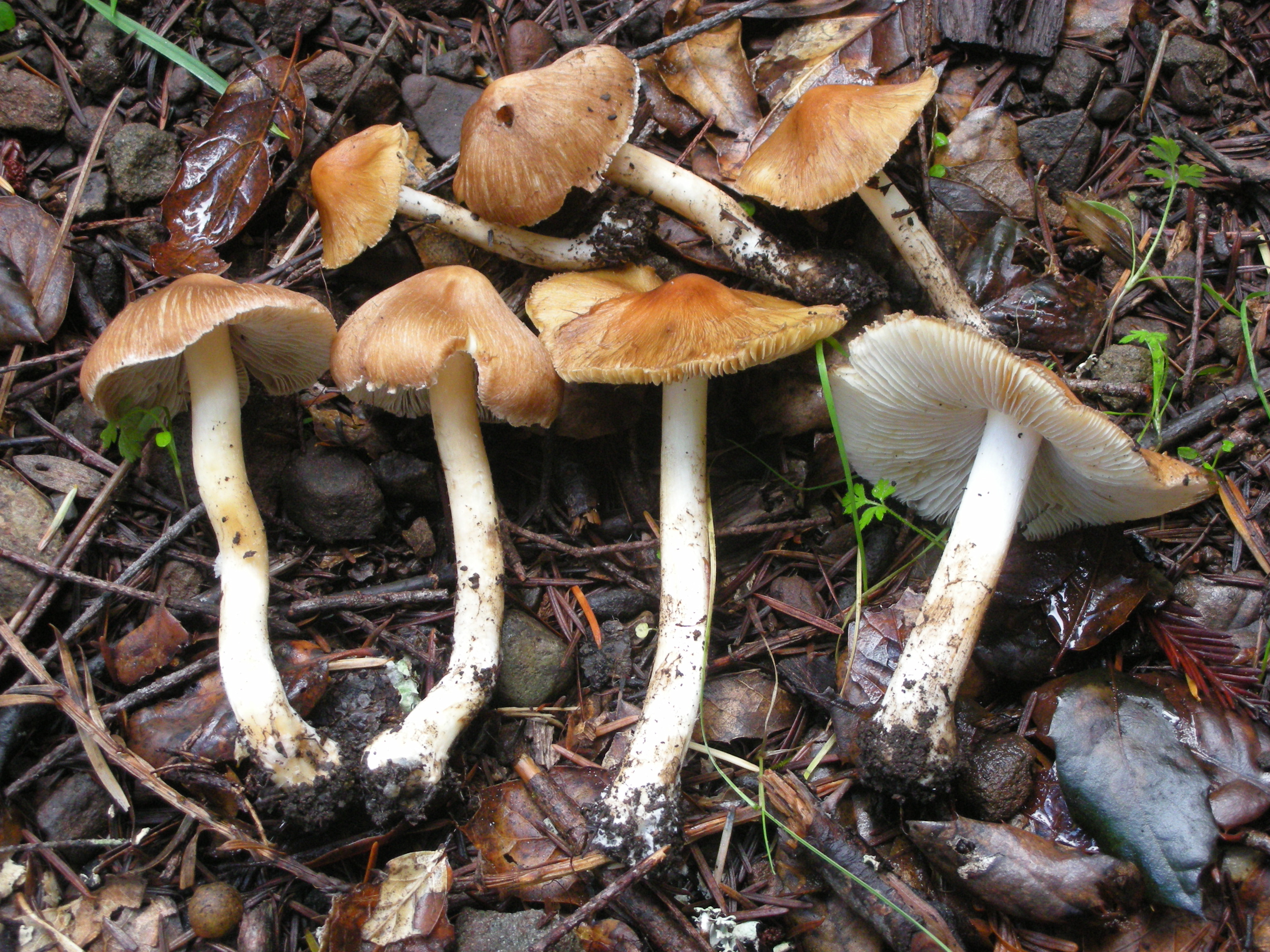

Scientific classification
- Domain: Eukaryota
- Kingdom: Fungi
- Division: Basidiomycota
- Class: Agaricomycetes
- Order: Agaricales
- Family: Inocybaceae
- Genus: Inocybe
- Species: I. rimosa

Binomial name
- Inocybe rimosa (Bull.) P.Kumm.

Synonyms
- Inocybe fastigiata (Schaeff.) Quél.

= Inocybe rimosa =

Species of fungus

Inocybe rimosa (formerly known as Inocybe fastigiata), commonly known as straw-colored fiber head, is a poisonous mushroom native to Europe. Its toxic ingredient is muscarine, discovered during the 1930s. Serious poisoning can result from consuming any quantity of the mushroom.

German naturalist Jacob Christian Schäffer described this species in 1774. Lucien Quélet transferred it to the genus Inocybe in 1872.

The tan (or rarely whitish) cap is cone-shaped then expands, generally retaining an umbo and a darker center. Its surface is fibrous. The gills are light grayish and brown with age. The stalk is whitish, semi-fibrillose, and slightly clavate. The odour tends to be spermatic.

In Israel, the species grows under Palestine oak (Quercus calliprinos) and pines, with mushrooms still appearing in periods of little or no rain as they are mycorrhizal.

In Israel, it is confused with edible mushrooms of the genus Tricholoma, particularly Tricholoma terreum, and Suillus granulatus, all of which grow in similar habitats. I. sororia is another similar species.
