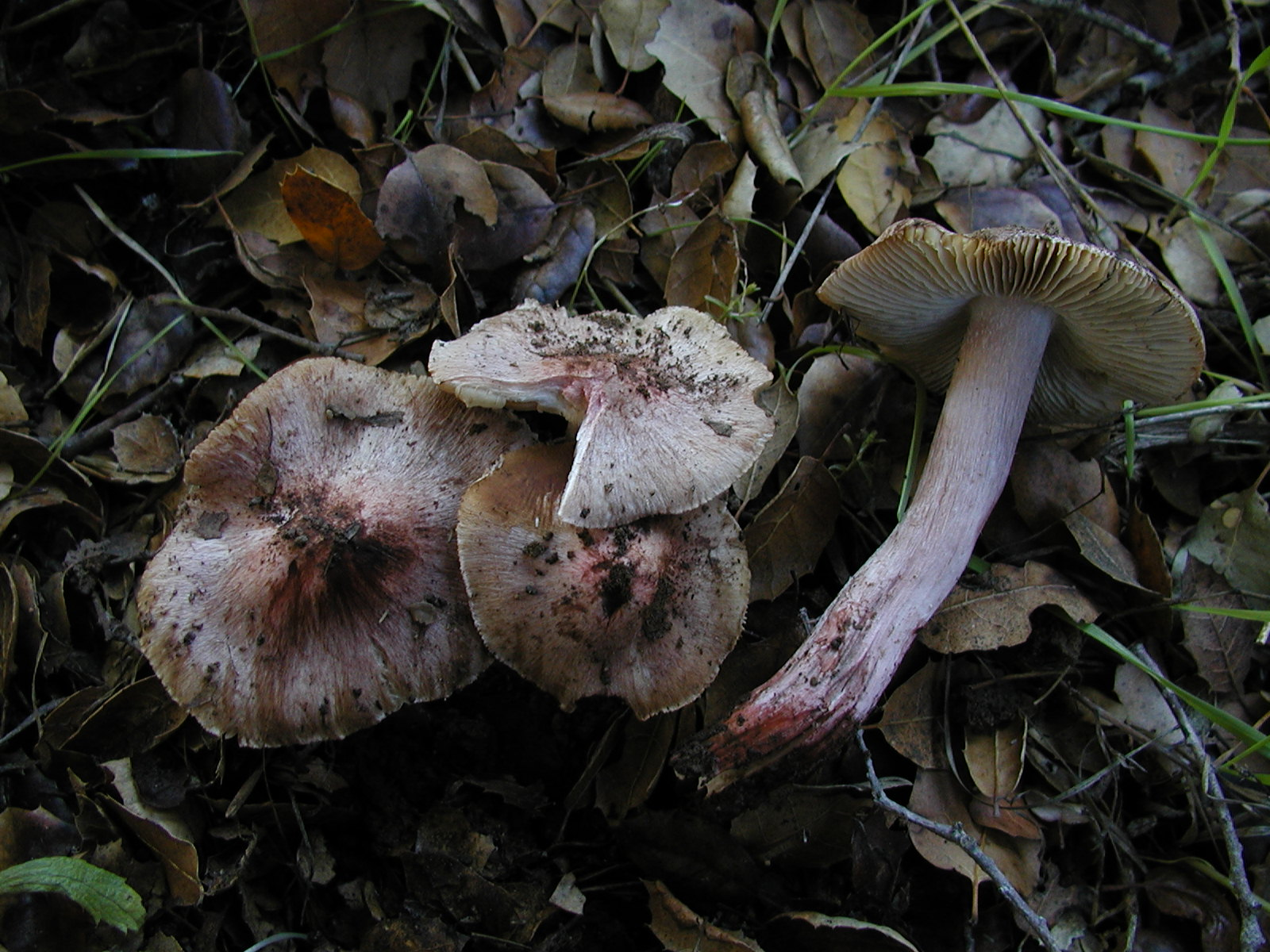

Scientific classification
- Kingdom: Fungi
- Division: Basidiomycota
- Class: Agaricomycetes
- Order: Agaricales
- Family: Inocybaceae
- Genus: Inosperma
- Species: I. adaequatum

Binomial name
- Inosperma adaequatum (Britzelm.) Matheny & Esteve-Rav.

Synonyms
- Inocybe adaequata (Britzelm.) Sacc. Agaricus adaequatus Britzelm.

= Inosperma adaequatum =

Species of fungus

Inosperma adaequatum, known as Inocybe adaequata until 2019, is a species of fungus in the family Inocybaceae found in North America and Europe.
