= Giacomo Bresadola =

Italian mycologist

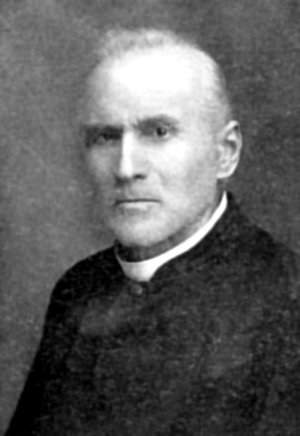
- Engraving of Tozzi
- Born: February 14, 1847; Mezzana, Trentino, Austrian Empire
- Died: 9 June 1929 (aged 82); Trento, Kingdom of Italy
- Parent(s): Simone Bresadola and Domenica Bresadola
- Scientific career
- Fields: Mycology and botany
- Author abbrev. (botany): Bres.

Giacomo Bresadola (Mezzana, Trento; often given as Giacopo) 14 February 1847 – Trento 9 June 1929) was an eminent Italian mycologist. Fungi he named include the deadly Lepiota helveola and Inocybe patouillardii, though the latter is now known as Inosperma erubescens as this latter description predated Bresadola's by a year. He was a founding member of the Société mycologique de France (Mycology Society of France).

== Life ==
Bresadola was born in 1847 into a farming family in Trent, then an Austrian possession. From a very early age, he showed an interest in botany. After attending elementary school at Mezzana, he was sent by his father to Cloz in the Val di Non at the age of nine to continue his studies with his uncle who was a priest. His uncle, however, considered him too rambunctious and quickly sent him home again. In 1857, his father moved to Montichiari in Brescia to become a bronze merchant. At twelve years of age, he left to study at the technical institute in Rovereto. Having placed at the head of his class four years in a row, he was so disappointed at being classed second that he abandoned his studies to enter the seminary at Trent.

Upon becoming a priest, he was appointed to the parishes of Baselga di Pinè, Roncegno, and Malè. In 1878, he became the vicar at Magràs, a position he held for five years. During this period, he again started to become keenly interested in botany and spent time with Francesco Ambrosi, who introduced him to the bryologist Gustavo Venturi and the work of Carlo Vittadini. Both the large number of mushrooms that he found during his excursions and his contact with various mycologists led to a specific interest in mycology.

Thus he met with Pier Andrea Saccardo, a professor of botany at the University of Padua and celebrated mycologist. Saccardo directed Bresadola to Lucien Quélet and later Émile Boudier, with whom he would have a warm relationship. From this point on, he maintained a voluminous and broad correspondence with upwards of 400 Italian and foreign specialists, a collection that is now housed at the Museo delle Scienze in Trento.

Starting in 1881, he published the first installment of Fungi tridentini novi vel novum vel nondum delineati, a work which, when finished in 1892, ran to 232 pages of text and 217 plates. In 1884, he left to become vicar in Trent, where he would remain for the rest of his life. In 1887, he was named administrator of the Trent episcopacy's estates, a position he held until 1910.

He became a leading specialist in various areas, in which he enjoyed close collaborations: Agaricomycetes, with Quélet and Adalbert Ricken; Aphyllophoromycetideae, with Narcisse Théophile Patouillard and the Canon Hubert Bourdot; and finally Discomycetes with Boudier. He also developed a keen interest in exotic specimens and published various observations on examples he received from all parts of the world, including Cameroon, Congo, Hungary, Saxony, Poland, San Tomé, and Samoa. Under the auspices of the Italian Botanical Society and the Natural History Museum in Trent, he undertook the monumental Iconographia mycologica, a partially posthumous work which comprised some 25 volumes and 1,250 colour plates. In 1910, he retired and relied on his friends and family for a reasonable pension. Unfortunately, the First World War diminished its value considerably and to survive he was forced to sell off piecemeal his extensive library, his plant collection and his original drawings. In 1927, the University of Padua conferred upon him a doctorate honoris causa and the Italian government named him to the Order of the Crown of Italy. He died in Trent in June, 1929 and was buried at municipal expense.

Bresadola is the author of 1017 species of mushrooms and some fifteen genres in roughly sixty publications, almost all of which are written in Latin. His collections are today conserved in various institutions. The Natural History Museum of Stockholm has the largest collection (some thirty thousand species), although additional parts of Bresadola's collection are to be found in the Universities of Washington, Trent, Uppsala, Leiden and Paris. Bresadola issued two exsiccata-like series, namely Fungi Tridentini and Champignons des Iles de St. Thomé et des Princes, the latter in cooperation with Casimir Roumeguère.

== Works ==
- 1890 : Fungi Kamerunenses a cl. viro Joanne Braun lecti, additis nonnullis aliis novis, vel criticis ex regio museo bot. Berolinensi. Bulletin de la Société Mycologique de France 6 (1): 32-49.
- 1891 Fungi Lusitani collecti a cl. viro Adolphus Fr. Moller, anno 1890. Boletim da Sociedade Broteriana 9: 1-9 [reprint pag.].
- 1891 : Champignons de la Hongrie. Revue Mycologique Toulouse 13: 20-33.
- 1892 : Fungi aliquot Saxonici novi lecti a cl. W. Krieger. Hedwigia 31: 40-41.
- 1893 : Fungi aliquot Saxonici novi lecti a cl. W. Krieger. Hedwigia 32: 32-[?].
- 1894 : Fungi aliquot Saxonici novi vel critici a cl. W. Krieger lecti (contributio III ad Floram Mycol. Saxoniae). Hedwigia 33: 206-210.
- 1896 : Fungi aliquot Saxonici novi a cl. W. Krieger lecti. IV. Hedwigia 35: 199-[200].
- 1896 : Fungi Brasilienses lecti a cl. Dr Alfredo Möller. Hedwigia 35: 276-302.
- 1897 : Hymenomycetes Hungarici Kmetiani. Atti dell'I.R. Accademia di Scienze Lettere ed Arti degli Agiati in Rovereto Ser. 3 3: 66-[114].
- 1899 : I funghi mangerecci e velenosi dell'Europa media con speciale riguardo a quelli che crescono nel Trentino (première édition).
- 1900 : Fungi aliquot Saxonici novi. VI. Hedwigia 39: 325-[347].
- 1900 : Hymenomycetes Fuegiani a cl. P. Dusén et O. Nordenskjöld lecti. K. Vetenskaps-Akademiens Förhandlingar 2: 311-316.
- 1900 : Hymenomycetes fuegiani a Dusén, Nordenskjold lecti. Wissenschaftliche Ergebnisse der Schwedischen Expedition nach den Magellansländern. 1895-1897 Band. III.
- 1902 : Mycetes Lusitanici novi. Atti dell'I.R. Accademia di Scienze Lettere ed Arti degli Agiati in Rovereto Ser. 3 8: 128-133.
- 1903 : Fungi Polonici a cl. Viro B. Eichler lecti (continuatio). Annales Mycologici 1 (1-2): 65-131, 1 planche.
- 1903 : Fungi Polonici. Annales Mycologici 1 (1): 65-96.
- 1903 : Mycologia Lusitanica. Diagnoses fungorum novorum. Brotéria Ser. Botânica 2: 87-92.
- 1905 : Hymenomycetes novi vel minus cogniti. Annales Mycologici 3: 159-164.
- 1906 : I funghi mangerecci e velenosi dell'Europa media con speciale riguardo a quelli che crescono nel Trentino. II edizione riveduta ed aumentata. Trento: Stab. Lit. Tip. Giovanni Zippel 1906. 8vo, p (1-5) 6-142 et 121 planches (don't 120 lithographies coul.).
- 1908 : Fungi aliquot Gallici novi vel minus cogniti. Annales Mycologici 6: 37-47.
- 1908 : Drittes Verzeichniss zu meiner Exsiccatenwerk `Fungi Selecti Exsiccati', Serien IX-XII (201-300). Verhandlungen des Botanischen Vereins der Provinz Brandenburg 50: 29-51.
- 1911 : Fungi Congoenses. Annales Mycologici 9: 266-276.
- 1911 : Adnotanda mycologica. Annales Mycologici 9 (4): 425-428.
- 1912 : Polyporaceae Javanicae. Annales Mycologici 10: 492-508.
- 1912 : Basidiomycetes Philippinenses. Series I. Hedwigia 51 (4): 306-326.
- 1912 : Basidiomycetes Philippinenses. Series II. Hedwigia 53: 46-80.
- 1913 : Champignons de Congo Belge. Bulletin du Jardin Botanique de l'État à Bruxelles 4: 6-30.
- 1915 : Neue Pilze aus Sachsen. Annales Mycologici 13: 104-106.
- 1915 : Basidiomycetes Philippinenses. Series III. Hedwigia 56 (4): 289-307.
- 1916 : Synonymia et adnotanda mycologica. Annales Mycologici 14 (3-4): 221-242.
- 1920 : Selecta mycologica. Annales Mycologici 18 (1-3): 26-70.
- 1925 : New species of fungi. Mycologia 17 (2): 68-77.
- 1926 : Selecta mycologica II - Studi Trentini Sen Il. Sci. Nat. ed. Econ. 7 (1): 51-81.
- 1927 [publ. 1928] : Iconografia Mycologica 3: 101-150. Mediolani.
- 1929 : Iconografia Mycologica 9: 401-450.
- 1929 : Iconografia Mycologica 12: 551-600.
- 1930 : Iconografia Mycologica 16: 751-800.
- 1893 : Bresadola, G., Hennings, P. & Magnus, P.. Die von Herrn P. Sintenis auf der Insel Portorico 1884-1887 gesammelten Pilze. Botanische Jahrbücher für Systematik, Pflanzengeschichte und Pflanzengeografie 17: 489-501, 1 planche.
- 1897 : Bresadola, G. & Saccardo, P.A.. Enumerazione dei funghi della Valsesia raccolti dal Ch. Ab. Antonio Carestia. Malpighia 11: 241-325.
- 1899 (1900) : Bresadola, G. & Saccardo, P.A.. Fungi Congoenses. Bulletin de la Société Royale de Botanique de Belgique 38: 152-168, 5 planches.

== See also ==
- Category:Taxa named by Giacomo Bresadola
