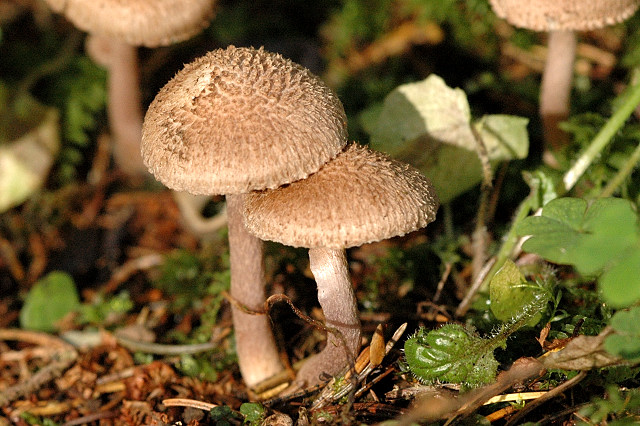
- Inocybe lanuginosa

Scientific classification
- Kingdom: Fungi
- Division: Basidiomycota
- Class: Agaricomycetes
- Order: Agaricales
- Family: Inocybaceae; Jülich (1981)

Type genus
- Inocybe (Fr.) Fr. (1863)

Genera
- Auritella; Inocybe; Inosperma; Mallocybe; Nothocybe; Pseudosperma; Tubariomyces

= Inocybaceae =

Family of fungi

The Inocybaceae are a family of fungi in the order Agaricales, the largest order of mushroom-forming fungi. It is one of the larger families within Agaricales (gilled mushrooms). This family exhibits an ectomycorrhizal ecology. Members of this family have a widespread distribution in tropical and temperate areas.

== Taxonomy ==
The type genus of the Inocybaceae, Inocybe, was originally described by Fries in 1821, as a 'tribe' within a broad mushroom genus, Agaricus. In 1863, Fries elevated Inocybe to generic rank.

Inocybe, had traditionally been placed within the family Cortinariaceae. Despite this, Dutch taxonomist Walter Jülich placed the genus in its own family, the Inocybaceae. Later, the Cortinariaceae were shown to be polyphyletic. Additionally, phylogenetic analyses of RPB1, RPB2 and nLSU-rDNA regions from a variety of Inocybe and related taxa would support Jülich's recognition of Inocybe at the family level. In their Dictionary of the Fungi, Kirk et al. (2008) did not distinguish between Inocybaceae and Crepidotaceae, but rather merged them into one family they called Inocybaceae. The literature has since then split up the classification given by Kirk et al. (2008) not only into Inocybaceae and Crepidotaceae, but also Tubariaceae and Chromocyphellaceae.

Inocybaceae has only become an independent family somewhat recently. The family is now split into 7 different clades, all recognized with generic rank: Auritella, Inocybe sensu stricto, Inosperma, Mallocybe, Nothocybe, Pseudosperma, and Tubariomyces. It is estimated that Inocybe (the largest genus within Inocybaceae) contains ca. 1050 species; Pseudosperma with ca. 70 species; Mallocybe with more than 55 species; Inosperma containing 70+ known species; and Auritella, Nothocybe, and Tubariomyces containing an unknown number of species, but estimated to be in rather small numbers.

In a 2019 molecular study, Matheny and colleagues used six gene phylogenetic analyses to determine relationships within the family. They recovered Nothocybe as sister to Inocybe, while members of Inocybe section Rimosae formed a lineage that diverged from the ancestor of the preceding two, and hence reclassified it as a genus Pseudosperma. Another branch gives rise to four lineages - the genus Auritella, what was Inocybe subgenus Mallocybe (now Mallocybe), Tubariomyces, and Inosperma (previously Inocybe subgenus Inosperma).

== Distribution ==
The Inocybaceae are widespread in north temperate regions, but also found in the tropics and the Southern Hemisphere. Members of this family have also been encountered in Africa, Australia, the neotropics, New Zealand, the north temperate zone, the paleotropics, Southeast Asia, South America, and the south temperate zone.

== Ecology ==
Members of Inocybaceae are ectomycorrhizal, which is a specialized form of symbyosis with plants generally thought to be mutually beneficial. It is estimated that they can form mycorrhiza with at least 23 plant families. Most species tend to prefer calcareous to neutrally-rich soils, and are often found at the edges of paths, roads, parks, or other urban habitats. Some authors reinforce that members of this family would generally prefer more calcareous soils and notes that this trait is well conserved.

== See also ==
- List of Agaricales families
- List of Inocybe species
