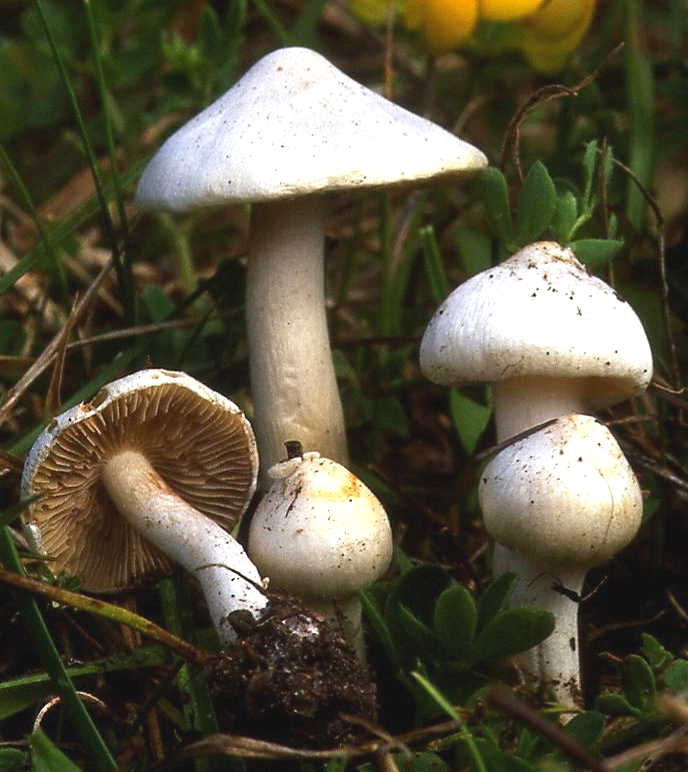

Scientific classification
- Kingdom: Fungi
- Division: Basidiomycota
- Class: Agaricomycetes
- Order: Agaricales
- Family: Inocybaceae
- Genus: Inocybe
- Species: I. geophylla

Binomial name
- Inocybe geophylla (Sowerby) P. Kumm.

= Inocybe geophylla =

Inocybe geophylla
- Mycological characteristics
- Gills on hymenium
- Cap is umbonate or conical
- Hymenium is adnexed
- Stipe is bare
- Spore print is brown
- Ecology is mycorrhizal
- Edibility is poisonous

Inocybe geophylla, commonly known as the little white inocybe, white fiberhead, earthy inocybe, common white inocybe or white fibercap, is a species of fungi in the genus Inocybe.

Inocybe geophylla forms a small white to cream mushroom with a fibrous silky umbonate cap and adnexed gills. It is widespread in Europe and North America, appearing under conifer and deciduous trees in summer and autumn. The mushroom is poisonous.

== Taxonomy ==
It was first described in 1799 as Agaricus geophyllus by English naturalist James Sowerby in his work Coloured Figures of English Fungi or Mushrooms. Christiaan Hendrik Persoon spelt it Agaricus geophilus in his 1801 work Synopsis methodica fungorum. Its specific epithet is derived from the Ancient Greek terms geo- "earth", and phyllon "leaf". It was given its current binomial name in 1871 by Paul Kummer.

== Description ==
The cap is 1–4 cm (0.39–1.57 in) wide and white or cream-coloured with a silky texture, at first conical before flattening out to a more convex shape with a pronounced umbo (boss). The cap margins may split with age. The thin stipe is 1–6 cm (0.39–2.36 in) high and 0.3–0.6 cm thick and lacks a ring. It has a small bulb at the base, and often does not grow straight.

The crowded gills are adnexed and cream early, before darkening to a brownish colour with the developing spores. The spore print is brown. The almond-shaped spores are smooth and measure around 9 × 5 μm. The faint smell has been likened to meal, damp earth, or even described as spermatic. The white or cream flesh has an acrid taste and does not change colour when cut or bruised.

=== Similar species ===
It may require microscopy to distinguish the species from I. umbratica. I. pudica is also similar.

Larger mushrooms can be confused with members of the genus Tricholoma or the edible Calocybe gambosa, though these have a mealy smell and gills that remain white. In Israel, it is confused with edible mushrooms of the genus Tricholoma, particularly T. terreum, and Suillus granulatus, all of which grow in similar habitat. In North America, it resembles mushrooms of the genus Camarophyllus.

== Distribution and habitat ==
Inocybe geophylla is common and widespread across Europe and North America. In western North America it is found under live oak, pine and Douglas-fir. It is found in the Canadian Arctic regions of northern Manitoba and North West Territories in dryish tundra heath communities composed of American dwarf birch (Betula glandulosa), Arctic willow (Salix arctica), dwarf willow (S. herbacea), polar willow (S. polaris ssp. pseudopolaris), snow willow (S. reticulata), bog bilberry (Vaccinium uliginosum var. alpinum), lingonberry (V. vitis-idaea var. minus), alpine bearberry (Arctostaphylos alpina), alpine bistort (Persicaria vivipara), Arctic bell-heather (Cassiope tetragona) and northern white mountain avens (Dryas integrifolia). It is mycorrhizal, the fruiting bodies are found in deciduous and coniferous woodlands in summer and autumn. Within these locations, fruiting bodies may be found in grassy areas and near pathways, or often on rich, bare soil that has been disturbed at roadsides, and near ditches.

In Israel, I. geophylla grows under Palestine oak (Quercus calliprinos) and pines, with mushrooms still appearing in periods of little or no rain as they are mycorrhizal.

== Toxicity ==
Like many fibrecaps, I. geophylla contains muscarine. The symptoms are those of muscarine poisoning, namely, greatly increased salivation, perspiration (sweating), and lacrimation (tear flow) within 15–30 minutes of ingestion. With large doses, these symptoms may be followed by abdominal pain, severe nausea, diarrhea, blurred vision, and labored breathing. Intoxication generally subsides within two hours. Delirium does not occur.

The specific antidote is atropine. Inducing vomiting to remove mushroom contents is also prudent due to the speed of onset of symptoms. Death has not been recorded as a result of consuming this species. It is often ignored by mushroom hunters because of its small size.
