= I. tricolor =

I. tricolor may refer to:

- Ichthyophis tricolor, a caecilian species found in India
- Inocybe tricolor, a mushroom species widely distributed in temperate forests
- Ipomoea tricolor, a morning glory species native to the New World tropics

== See also ==
- Tricolor (disambiguation)
