= Inocybe coelestium =

Scientific classification
- Domain: Eukaryota
- Kingdom: Fungi
- Division: Basidiomycota
- Class: Agaricomycetes
- Order: Agaricales
- Family: Inocybaceae
- Genus: Inocybe
- Species: I. coelestium

Binomial name
- Inocybe coelestium Kuyper (1985)

Species of fungus

Inocybe coelestium is a member of the genus Inocybe which is widely distributed in Europe. It was described as new science by mycologist Thomas Kuyper in 1985. The specific epithet coelestium means 'celestials', "the inhabitants of the Mount Olympus, the gods; referring to its hallucinogenic properties."

== Biochemistry ==
Inocybe coelestium contains the compounds psilocybin, psilocin and baeocystin.

== See also ==
- List of Inocybe species
- List of Psilocybin mushrooms
