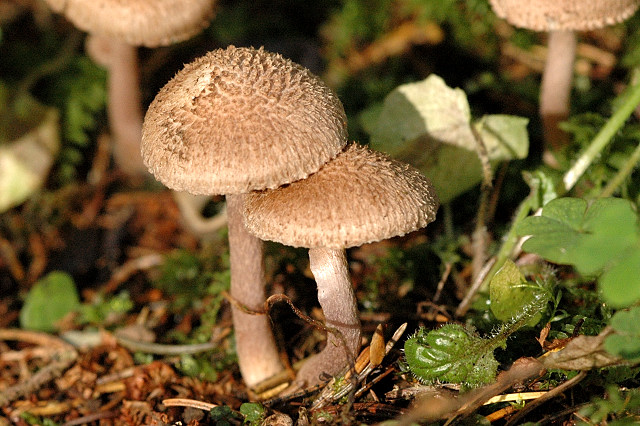

Scientific classification
- Kingdom: Fungi
- Division: Basidiomycota
- Class: Agaricomycetes
- Order: Agaricales
- Family: Inocybaceae
- Genus: Inocybe
- Species: I. lanuginosa

Binomial name
- Inocybe lanuginosa (Bull.) P. Kumm.

= Inocybe lanuginosa =

Species of fungus

Inocybe lanuginosa Mycological characteristics
- Gills on hymenium
- Cap is convex or flat
- Hymenium is adnate or sinuate
- Stipe has a cortina
- Spore print is brown
- Ecology is mycorrhizal
- Edibility is poisonous

Inocybe lanuginosa, commonly known as the woolly inocybe, is a species of mushroom in the family Inocybaceae.

== Description ==
The cap is 1-5 centimeters in diameter, is brown in color, and is covered in fibers and scales. It starts out convex, and becomes flat when the mushroom matures. The stipe is 2-5 centimeters in length and 2-4 millimeters wide. It is also covered in scales and fibers. The gills can be sinuate, adnexed, or adnate, and start out pale, becoming brown as the mushroom matures. The veil is similar to the cortina of Cortinarius and some other mushrooms. The spore print is brown.

=== Similar species ===
Inocybe leptophylla looks identical to I. lanuginosa, except for microscopic features. I. lanuginosa has pleurocystidia, but I. leptophylla does not. I. leptophylla also has bigger spores. I. stellatospora also looks very similar, but it grows on wood and has longer cystidia than I. lanuginosa.

== Habitat and ecology ==
Inocybe lanuginosa grows under conifers. It also sometimes grows under hardwoods. Occasionally, it grows on decaying wood. It fruits during fall.
