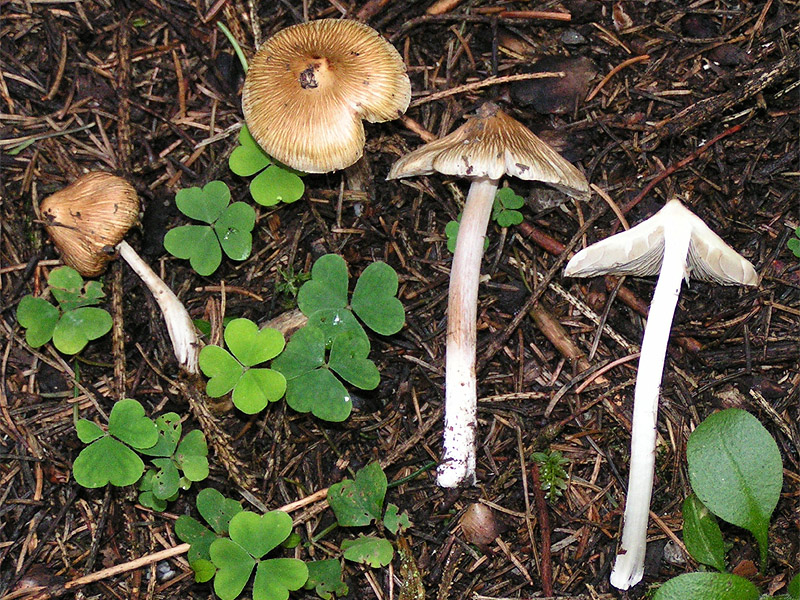
- Inocybe rimosa

Scientific classification
- Kingdom: Fungi
- Division: Basidiomycota
- Class: Agaricomycetes
- Order: Agaricales
- Family: Inocybaceae
- Genus: Inocybe (Fr.) Fr. (1863)

Type species
- Inocybe relicina (Fr.) Quél. (1888)

Synonyms
- Agaricus trib. Inocybe Fr. (1821); Agaricus subgen. Clypeus Britzelm. (1881); Astrosporina J.Schröt. (1889); Clypeus (Britzelm.) Fayod (1889); Agmocybe Earle (1909); Inocibium Earle (1909); Astrosporina S.Imai (1938); Inocybella Zerova (1974)

= Inocybe =

Genus of fungi

Inocybe is a genus of mushroom-forming fungi, with over 1,000 species. Its members are mycorrhizal, and some evidence shows that the high degree of speciation is due to adaptation to different trees and possibly also local habitats.

== Taxonomy ==
The genus was first described as Agaricus tribe Inocybe by Swedish scholar Elias Magnus Fries in volume 1 of his work, Systema mycologicum (1821), and verified in the volume 2 of his book Monographia Hymenomycetum Sueciae in 1863. All other renaming attempts are accepted synonymous.

Although originally placed in the family Cortinariaceae (later shown to be polyphyletic), phylogenetic analyses suggests that the genus is better placed as the type genus of the family Inocybaceae.

=== Sections or subgenera ===
Two supersections are informally recognized: Cortinate supersection: The stipe is only pruinose at the apex or the upper half. The stipe base is (generally) not bulbous and a remnant of a cortina is present in the margin of the young cap. Marginate supersection: The stipe are entirely pruinose and has a bulbose base as general.

Several genera are recognized within the family Inocybaceae:

Inocybe

This subgenus has pleurocystidia, usually thick-walled and in the apex has crystals. The basidiospores are smooth or angular-nodulose. The basidia is not necropigmented (basidia that become ochraceous and collapse). The hilar appendice is conspicuous. This subgenera is cosmopolitan and frequent in temperate ecosystems.

Auritella

This subgenus has no pleurocystidia and has necropigmented basidia. The spores are smooth and the hilar appendix is inconspicuous. Large cheilocystidia (>50 um). This is known from tropical Africa, Tropical, India and temperate Australia.

Inosperma

The fruiting bodies of this subgenus usually have a distinct odor (fruity, honey-like, fishy). The pileus is radially rimose ("Rimosae") or can be squamulose to squarrose ("Cervicolores"). The lamella has no pleurocystidia, but has cheilocystidia. Basidia necropigmented or not. The spores are smooth. In temperate areas. Wide distribution.

Mallocybe

The cap is usually woolly-squamulose, the cap surface is conspicuously darkening with alkali. The lamella broadly adnate to subdecurrent. The stipe is shorter and has not pleurocystidia. The basidia are necropigmented and there are also cheilocystidia as terminal elements. Spores smooth. Wide distribution

Nothocybe

The lamellae have no pleurocystidia but there are cheilocystidia. Spores smooth. Known from tropical India.

Pseudosperma

Fruitbodies have indistinct, spermatic or green corn odor. The pileus is radially rimose or rimulose, never squarrulose and rarely squamulose. Pleurocystidia are absent and cheilocystida are present. Spores smooth. Wide distribution.

Tubariomyces

Small fruiting bodies with tubarioid or omphalinoid habit. Decurrent lamellae and cheilocystidia present. Spores smooth. Known from mediterranean and tropical Africa.

=== Sections based in morphology ===
The genus Inocybe is very species-rich. The genus is divided according to Bon (2005) into three subgenera with sections:

- Subgenus: Inosperma (now a separate genus) - without crystal-bearing cystidia
  - Section: Depauperatae: wool-peeling surface
    - Inocybe dulcamara
  - Section: Cervicolores: cap with wool-peeling cuticle, strong aroma (sperm like)
    - Inocybe bongardii
  - Section: Rimosae: cap always radially fibrous and cracked
    - Inocybe rimosa
    - Inocybe erubescens
- Subgenus: Inocibium - with thick-walled, crystal-bearing pleurocystidia.
  - Section: Lactiferae: red or even greenish, with an extreme odor
    - Inocybe piriodora
    - Inocybe pudica
  - Section: Lilacinae: cap lilac, wool-peel surface, and scaly. Common.
    - Inocybe oscura
    - Inocybe hystrix
    - Inocybe griseolilacin
  - Section: Lacerae: non- rimose stipe, no liliac shades.
    - Inocybe lacera
  - Section: Tardae: stipe only bumpy at the top
    - Inocybe geophylla
    - Inocybe flocculosa
    - Inocybe virgatula
  - Section: Splendentes: stipe rimed completely or two-thirds.
    - Inocybe hirtella
- Subgenus: Clypeus - spores tuberculate or star-shaped
  - Section: Cortinatae: stipe thin or bumped to the top
    - Inocybe lanuginosa
  - Section: Petiginosae :full bumpy stipe without basl bulb
    - Inocybe fibrosa
  - Section: Marginatae: stipe pruinose with basal bulb. Crimping
    - Inocybe asterospora

=== Species ===
It is estimated that there are about 1,050 species within Inocybe. Representatives of the genus include:

- Inocybe aeruginascens (psychoactive)
- Inocybe coelestium (psychoactive)
- Inocybe corydalina var. corydalina Quél. (psychoactive)
- Inocybe corydalina var. erinaceomorpha (psychoactive)
- Inocybe geophylla (toxic)
- Inocybe haemacta (psychoactive)
- Inocybe hystrix
- Inocybe lacera
- Inocybe tricolor (psychoactive)

=== Etymology ===
The name Inocybe means "fibrous hat". It is taken from the Greek words ἴς (in the genitive ἴνος, meaning "muscle, nerve, fiber, strength, vigor") and κύβη ("head").

== Description ==
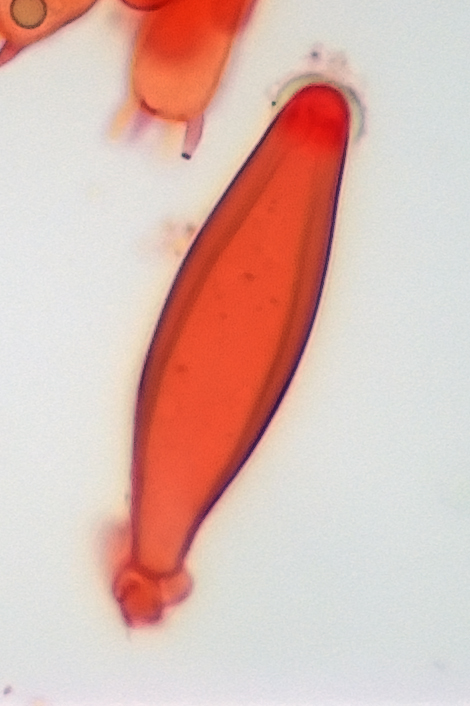
Metuloid-type cystidium, an identifying micromorphological characteristic of Inocybe

Typical mushrooms of the genus have various shades of brown, although some lilac or purplish species exist. Caps are small and conical, though flattening somewhat in age, generally with a pronounced central umbo. The cap often appears fibrous, giving the genus its common name of "fiber caps". Many species have a distinctive odor, various described as musty or spermatic.

Description valid for most species:

- Pileus: small to medium size, thin, fleshy, initially narrow conical or bell-shaped, or with a prominent or flattened umbo in the center. It is not hygrophanous and has a dry appearance. The pileus margin often shows at first a pale curtain that disappears quickly, and in old age it often presents short radial cracks. The cuticle is finely silky and sometimes sprinkled with remnants of the partial veil, further developing radial fibers. There are also species with a woolly surface (woolly in mycological sense). Coloring is at first all white to gray-whitish varieties. Some retain color, others change, varying between ocher-yellowish and brown, various shapes, even lilac-like to purple.
- Lamellae: are dense, thick and crowded, with short intermediate sinus at the edge and only weakly attached to the stipe, almost free. Coloring is mainly white at the beginning, which becomes mature turns to gray-brown, ocher-brown or gray-olive. The edges are whitish.
- Spores: they are brownish, tiny, normally oval to slightly ellipsoidal, often elongated in the form of almonds or beans (Clypeus tuberculous or star-shaped subgenus), smooth, never verrucous and germ-free. Basidia are tetrasporic. Cystidia with or without crystalline crystals, spindle-shaped, convex in the middle and with a sharp point at the tip.
- Stipe: it is thin, fibrous, cylindrical, more or less thickened and felt-white at the base, hollow inside. The surface is whitish, smooth, glossy, and often silky and slightly furfuraceous towards the apex of the stipe. It usually does not have a ring.
- Context: white to slightly yellowish, oxidized or not to reddish when cutting, usually having a faint smell of green corn, chlorine or sperm. Commonly the flesh contains muscarine.

== Neurotoxicity ==
Many Inocybe species contain large doses of muscarine, and no easy method of distinguishing them from potentially edible species exists. In fact, Inocybe is the most commonly encountered mushroom genus for which microscopic characteristics are the only means of certain identification to the species level. While the vast majority of Inocybes are neurotoxic, several rare species of Inocybe are hallucinogenic, having been found to contain indole alkaloids.

== Gallery ==
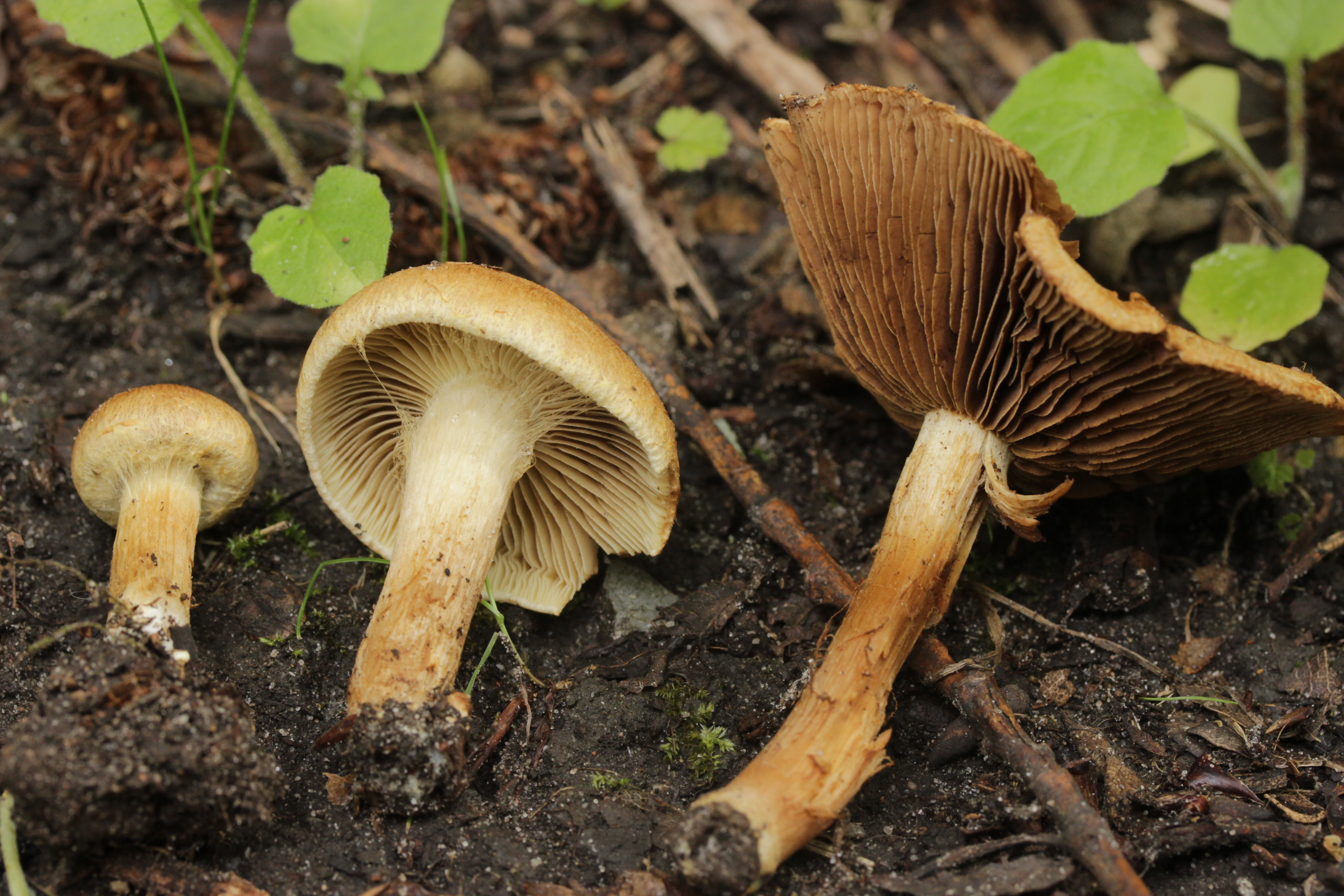
I. dulcamara (1)

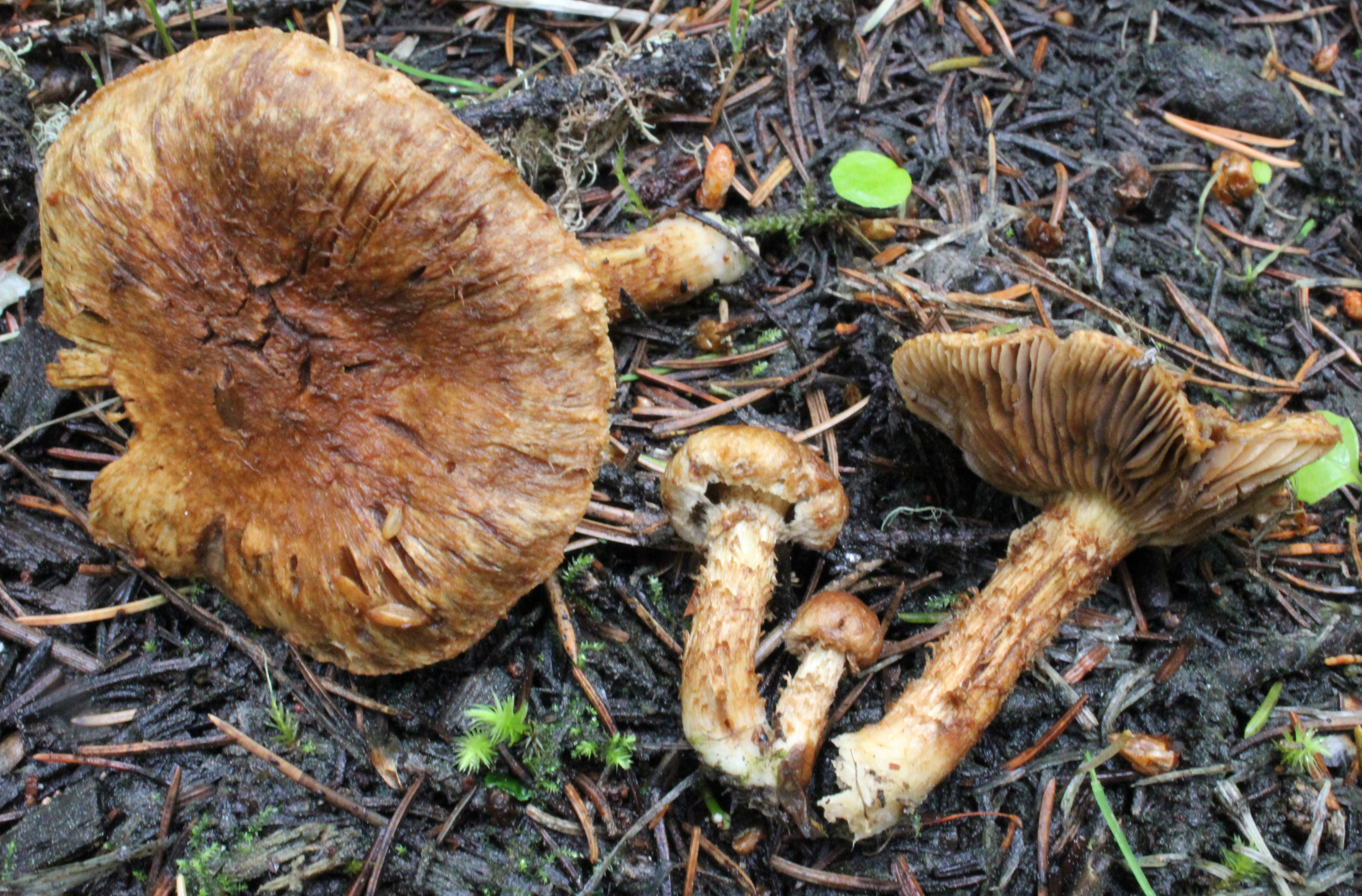
I. terrigena (1)

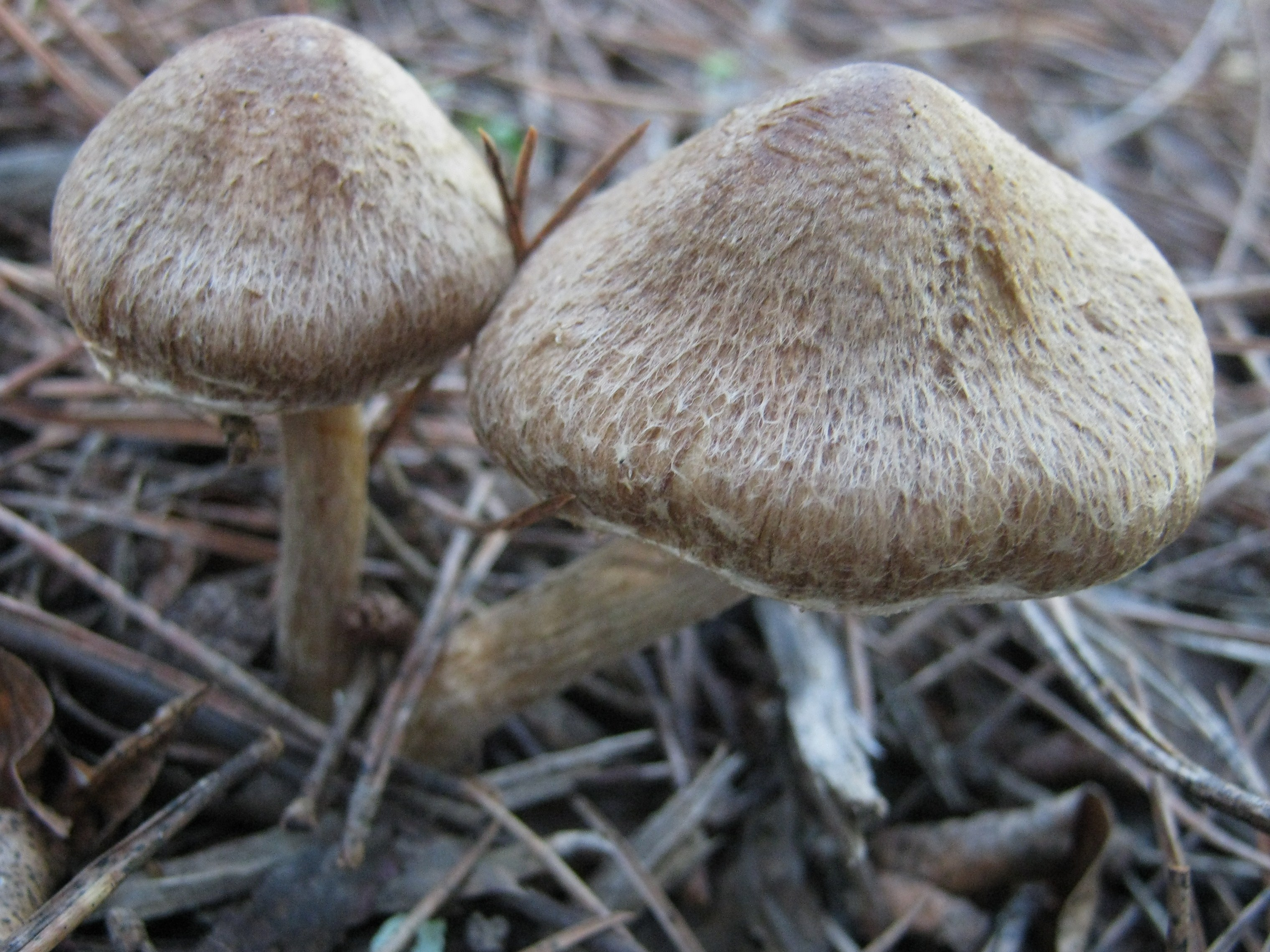
I. bongardii (2)

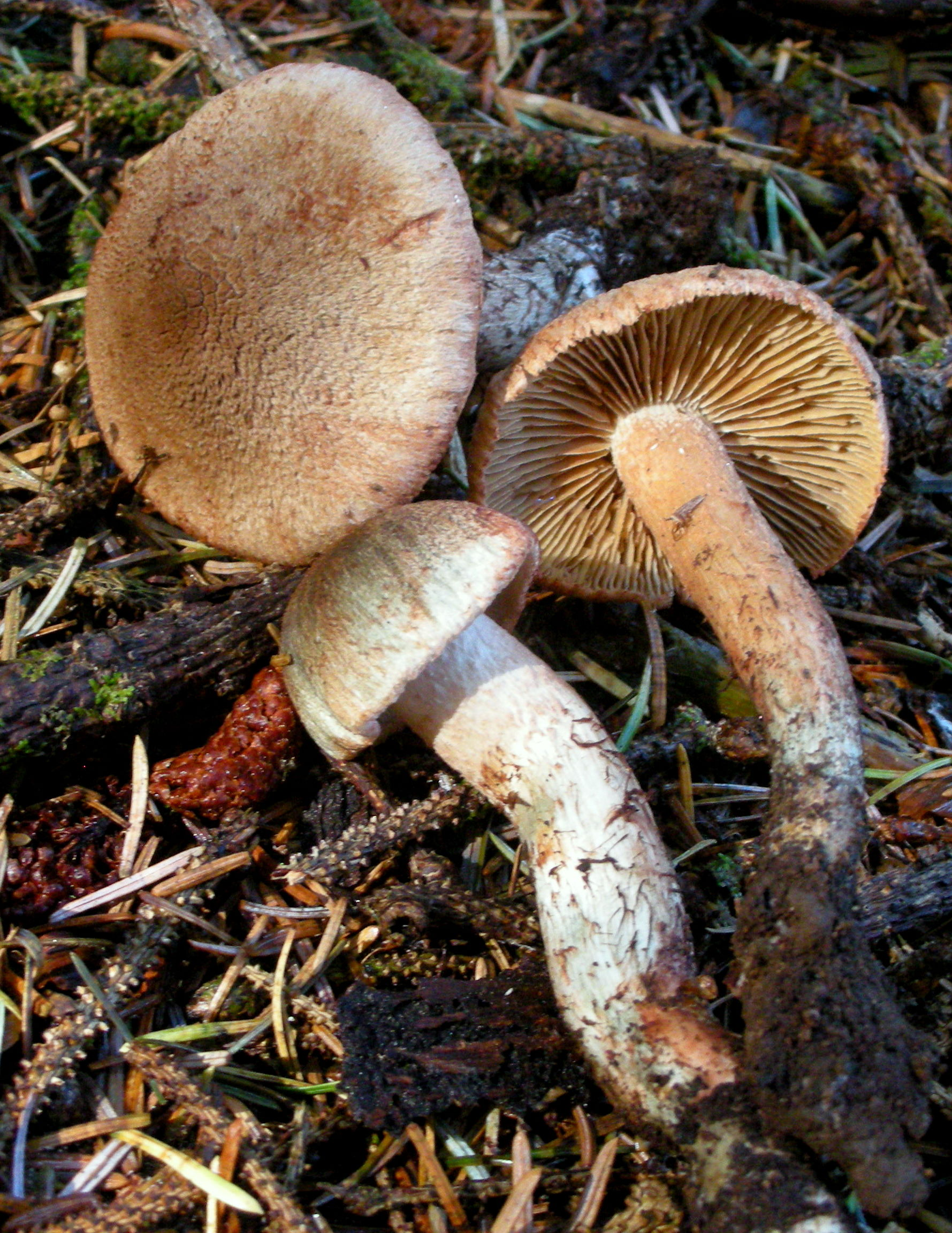
I. calamistrata (2)

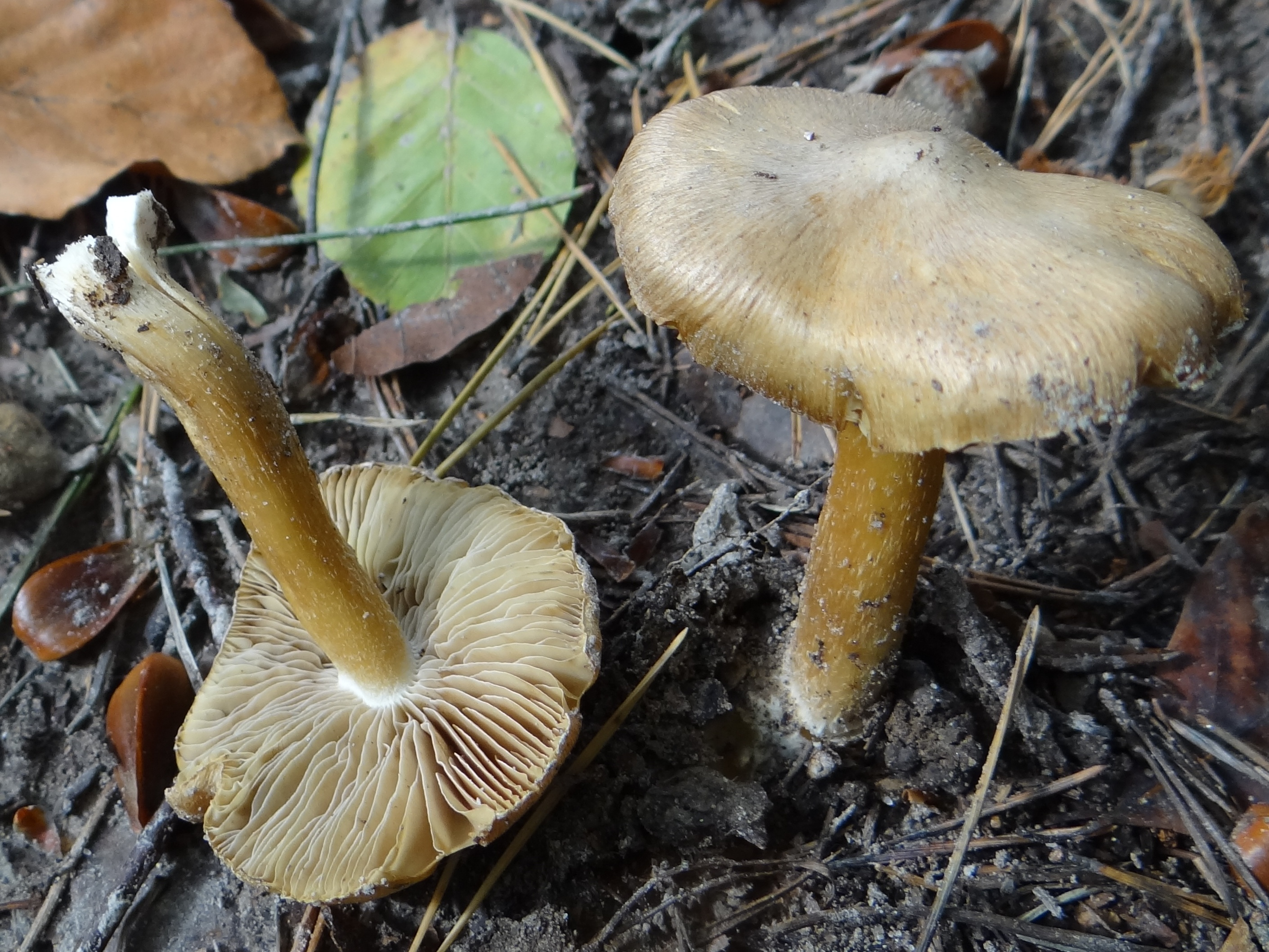
I. cookei (3)

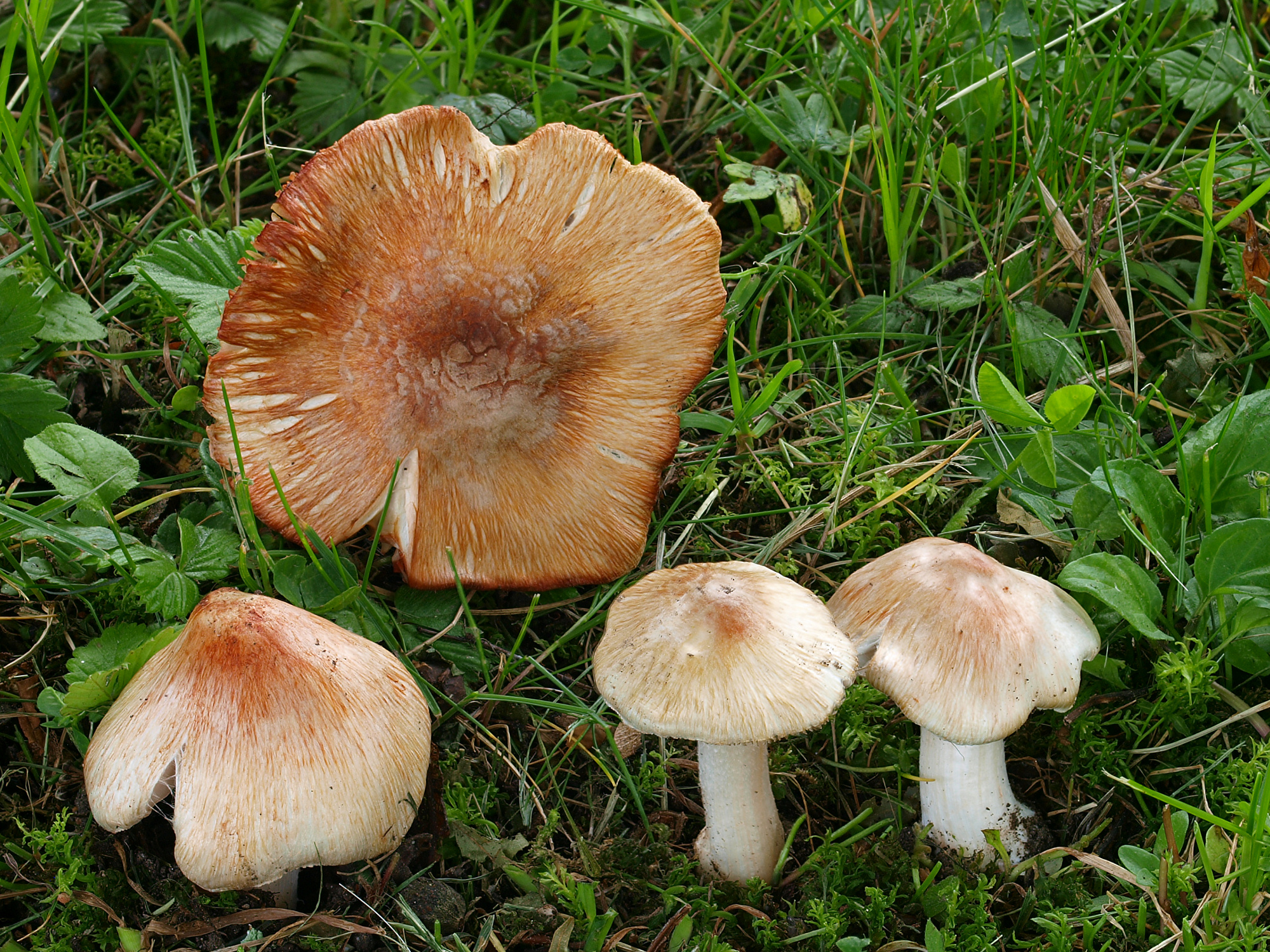
I. erubescens (3)

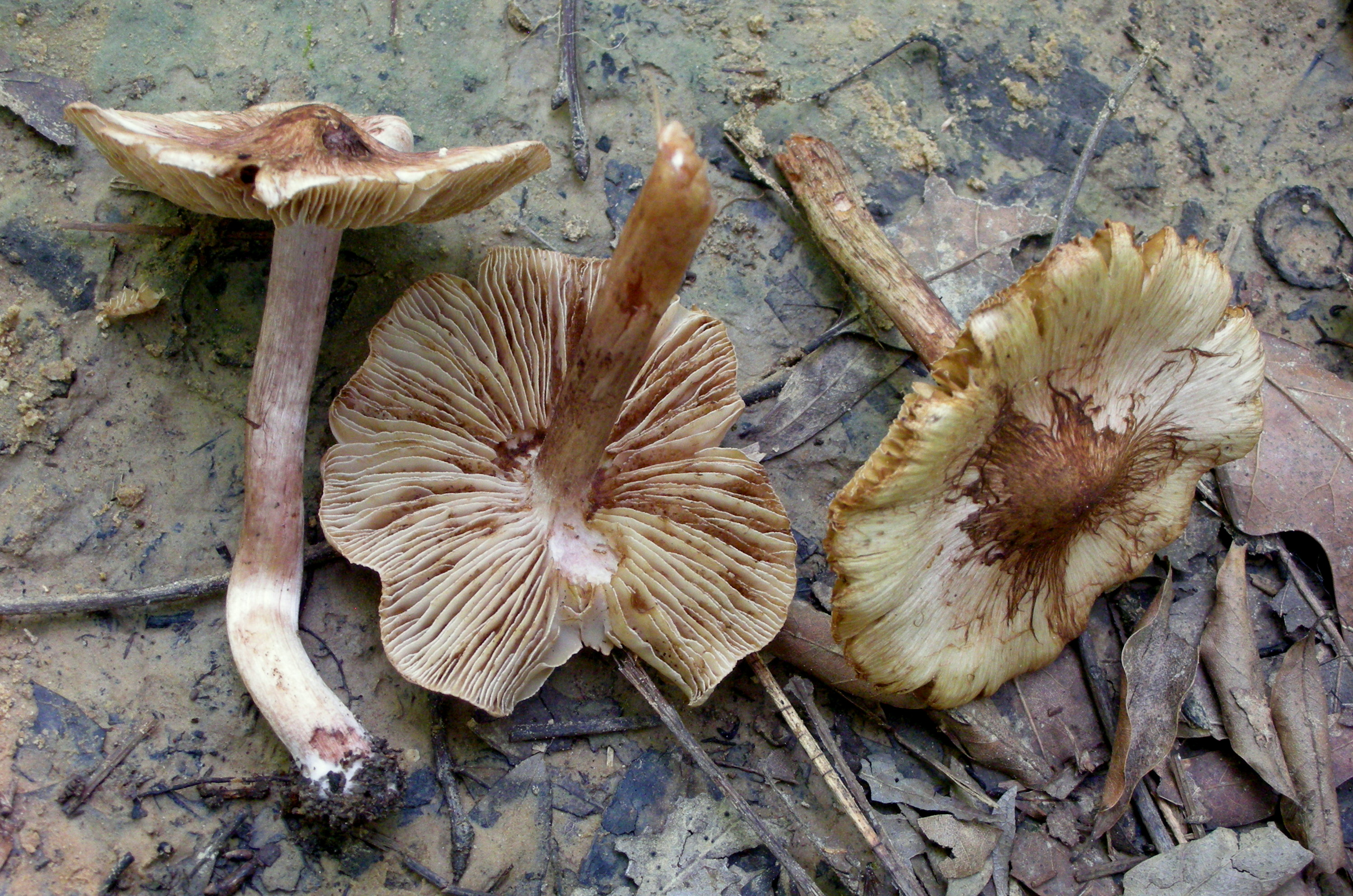
I. jurana (3)

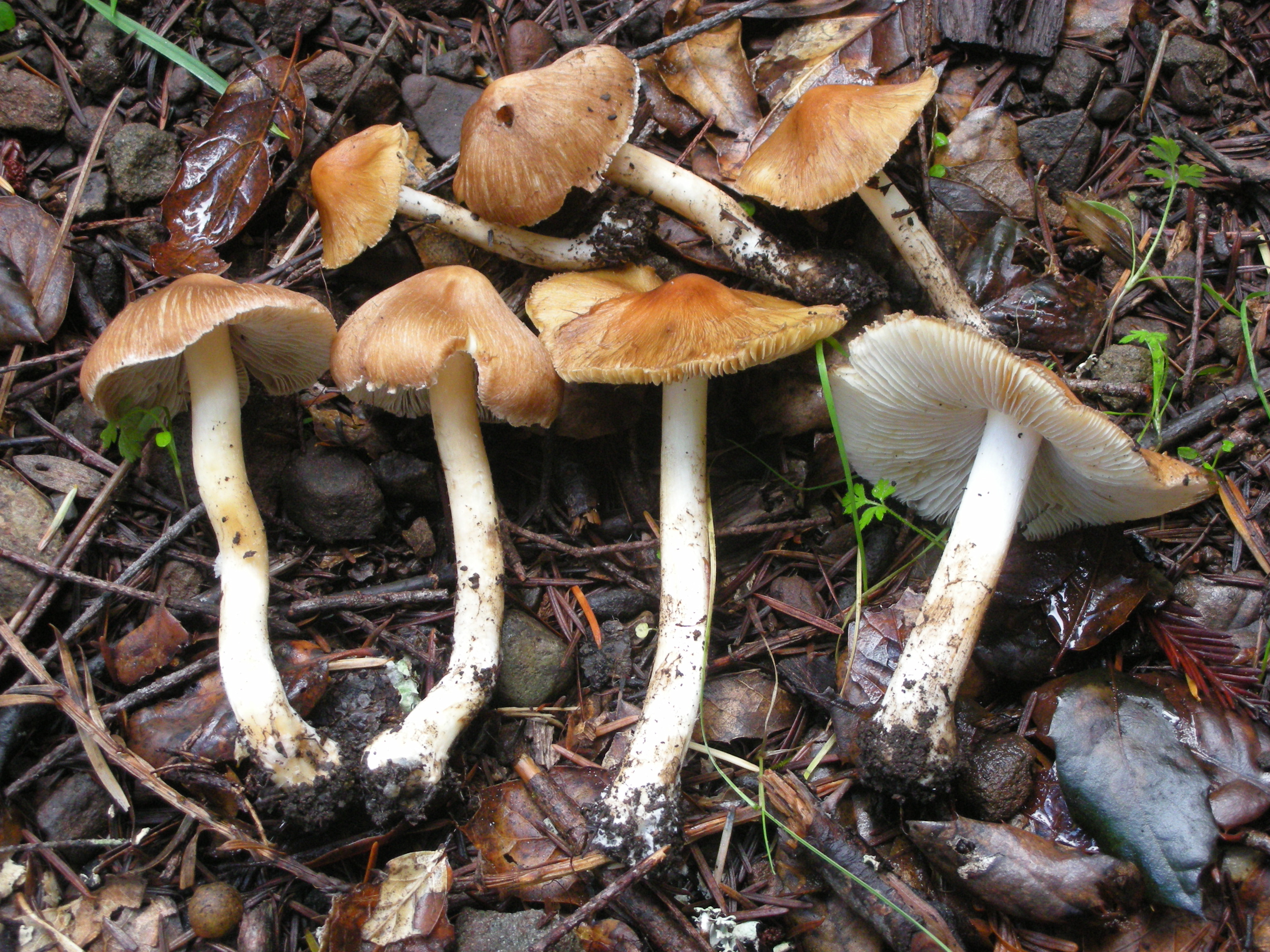
I. rimosa (3)

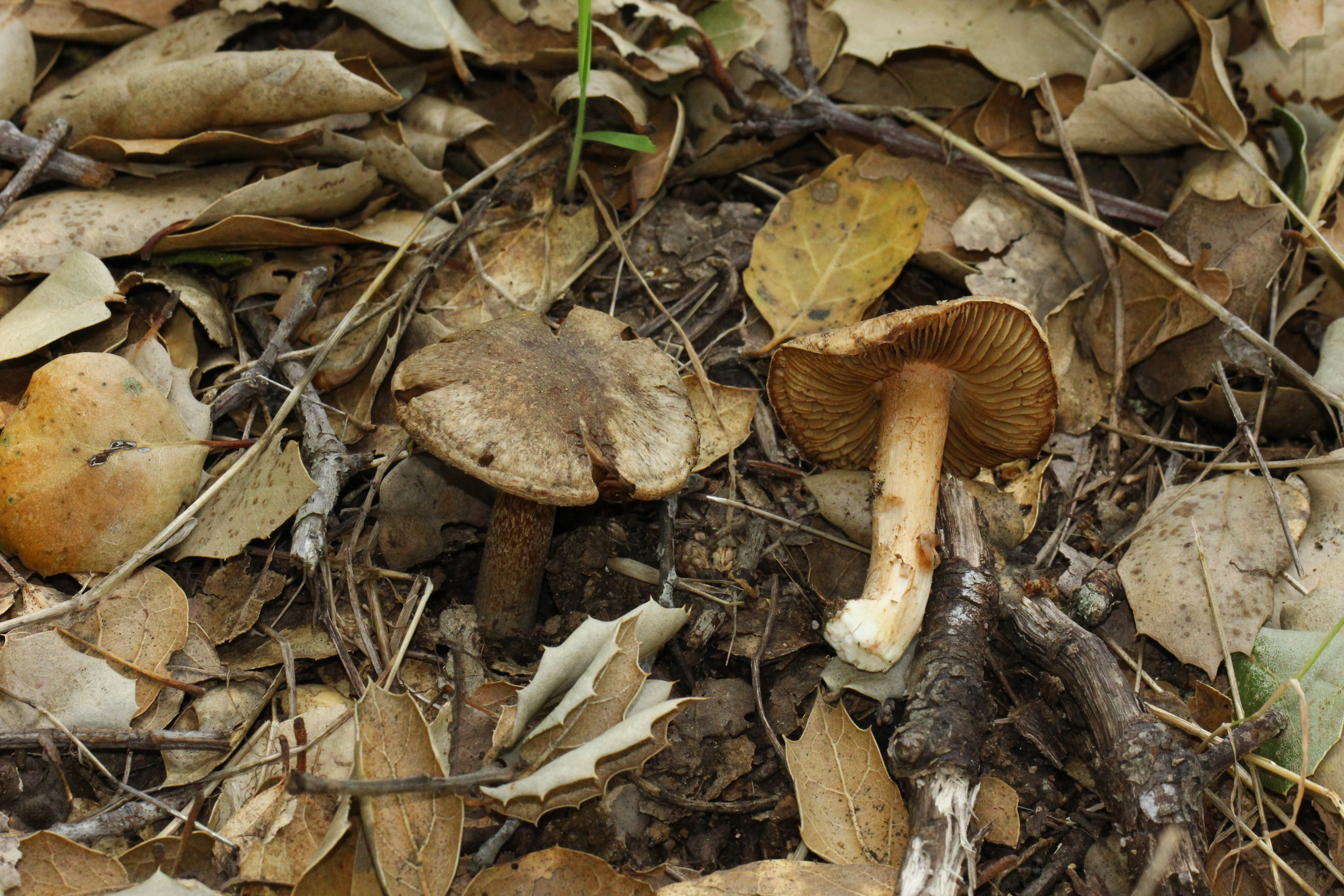
I. fraudans (4)

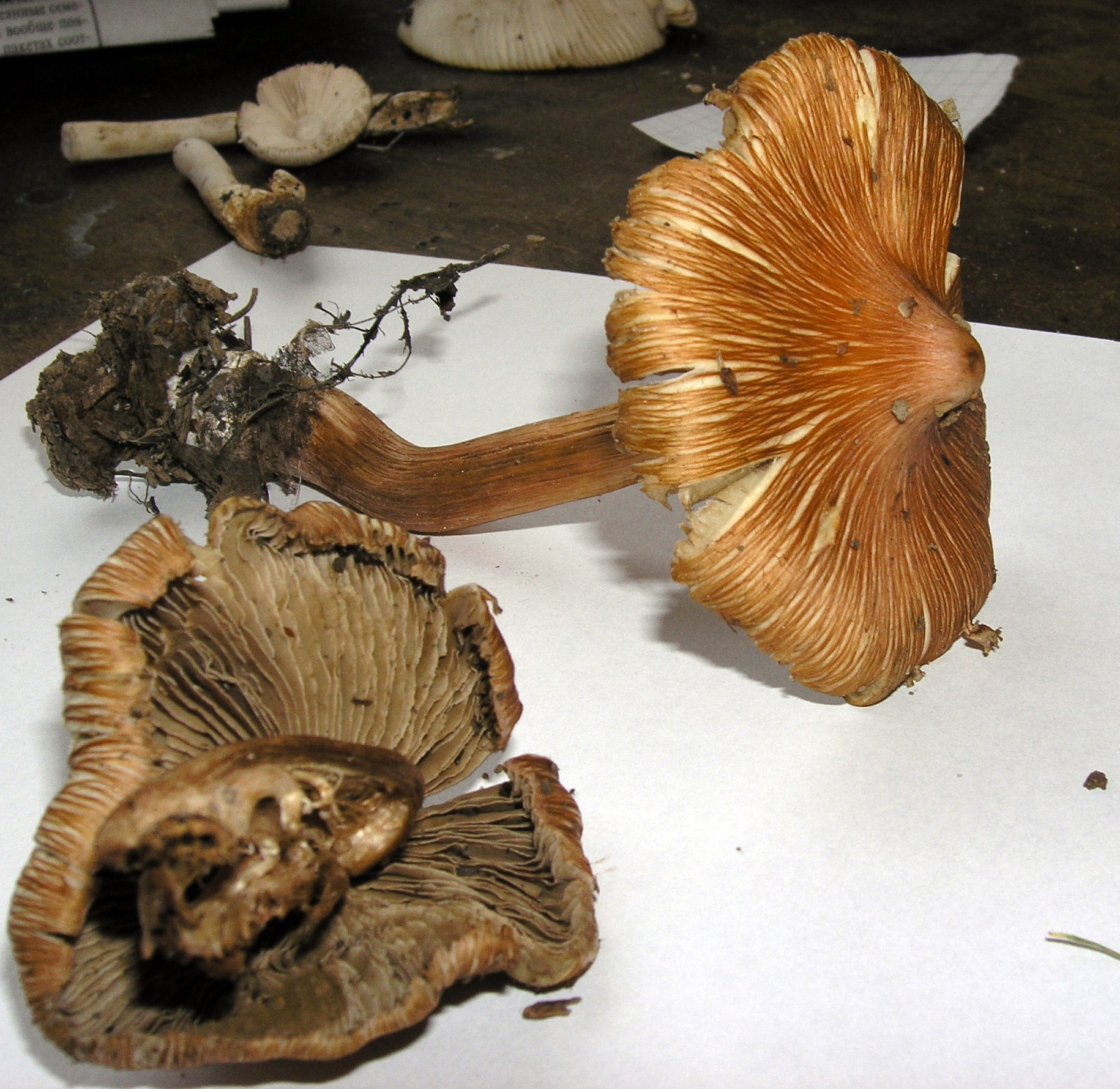
I. godeyi (4)
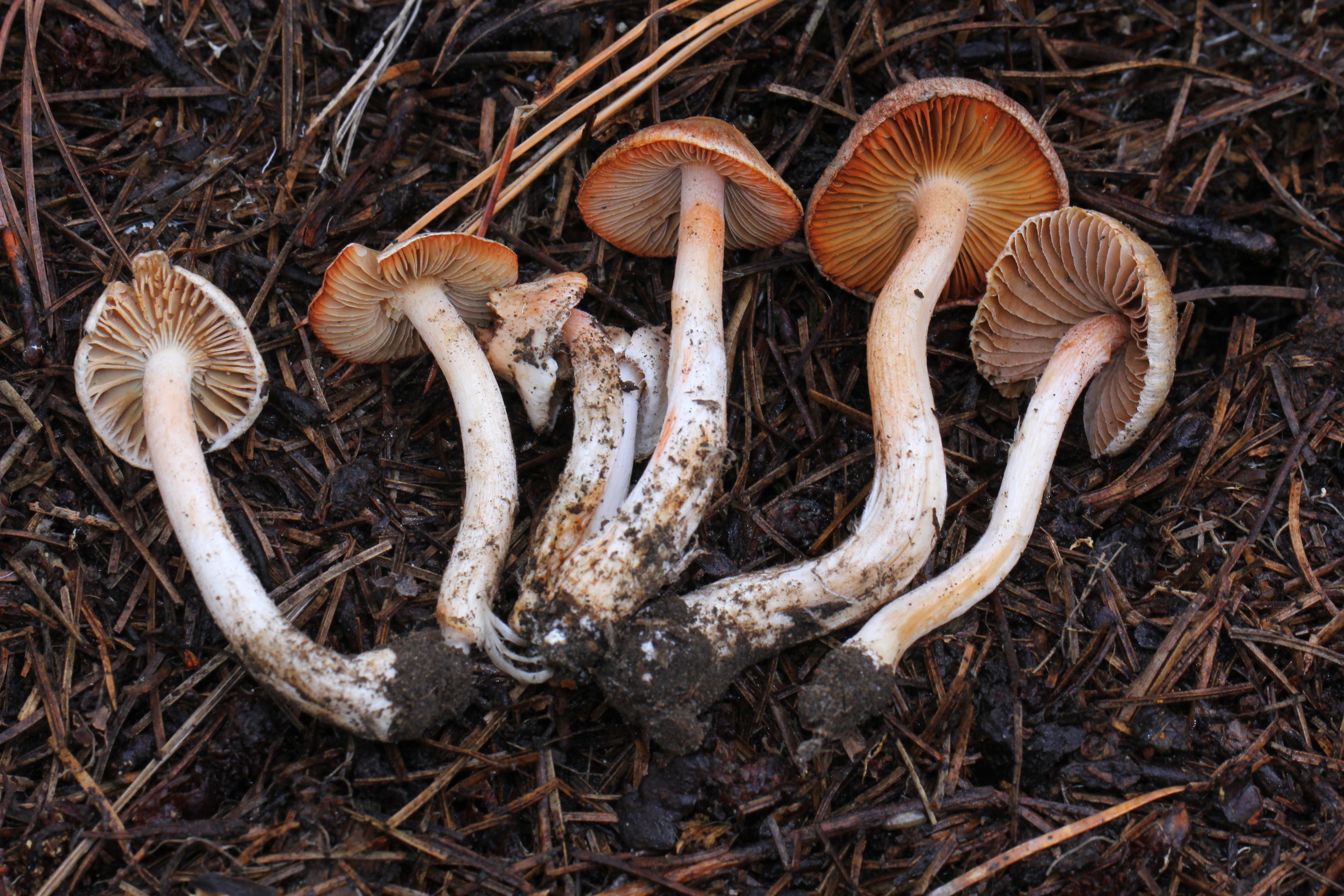
I. whitei (4)

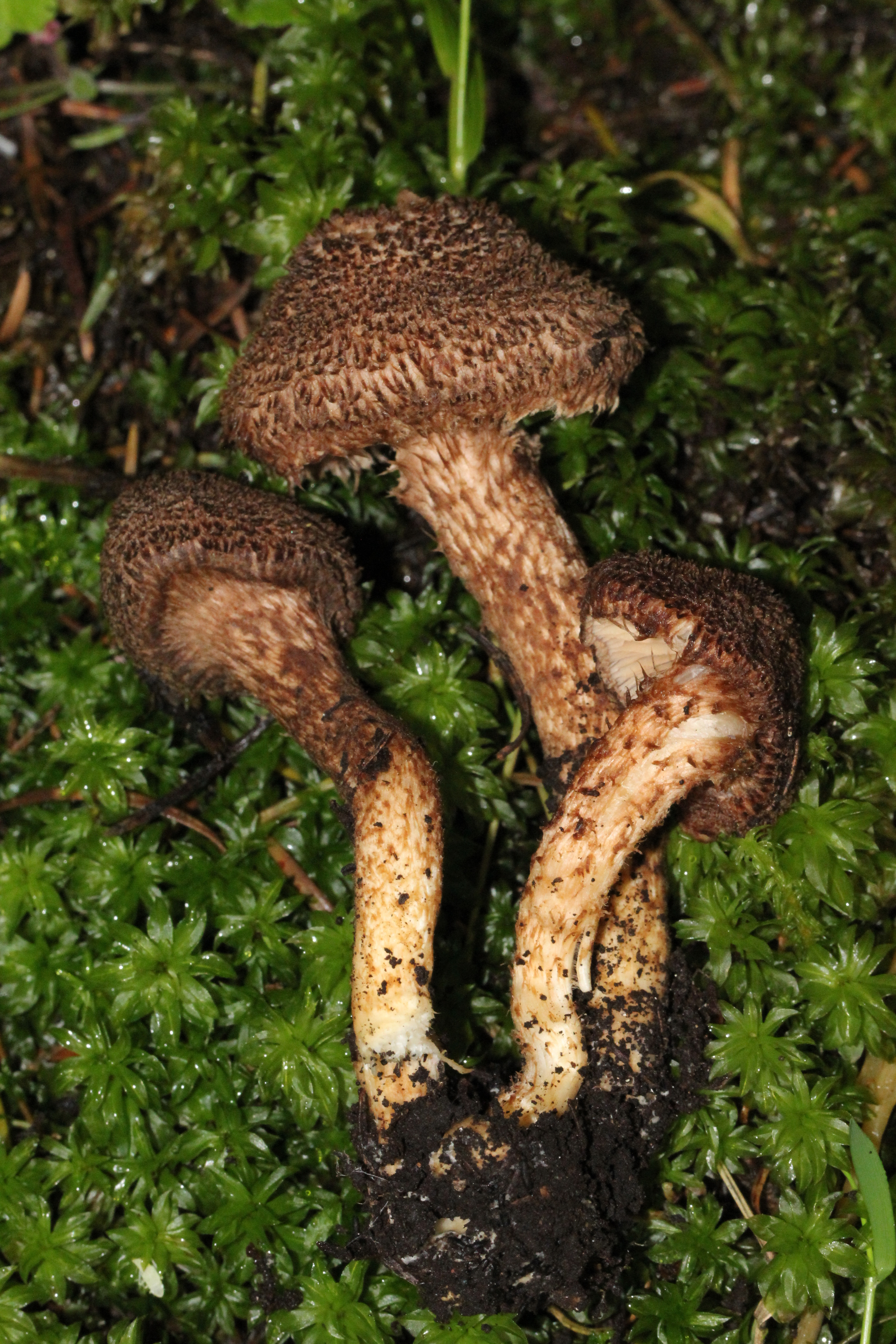
I. hystrix (5)

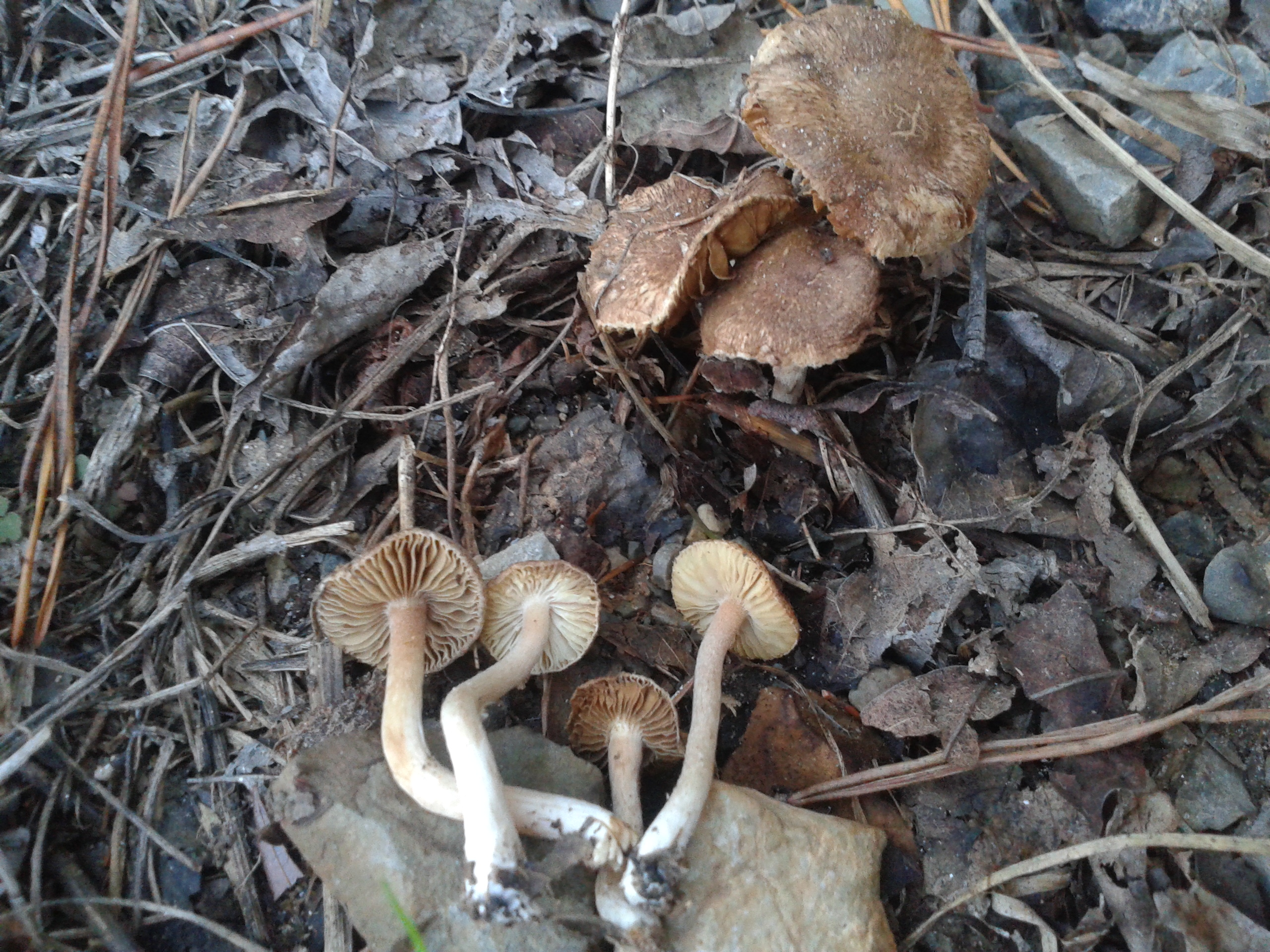
I. griseolilacina (5)

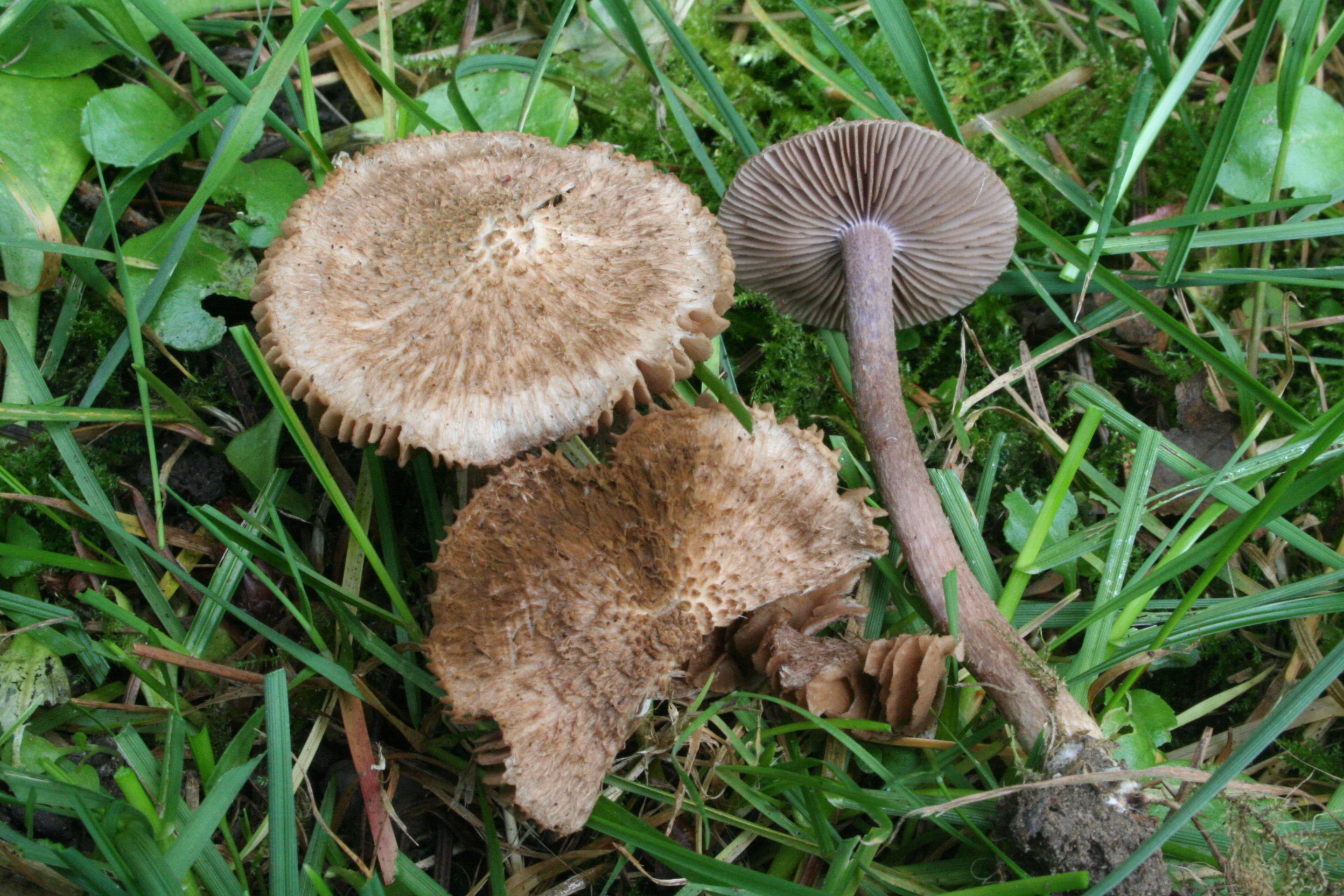
I. obscura (5)

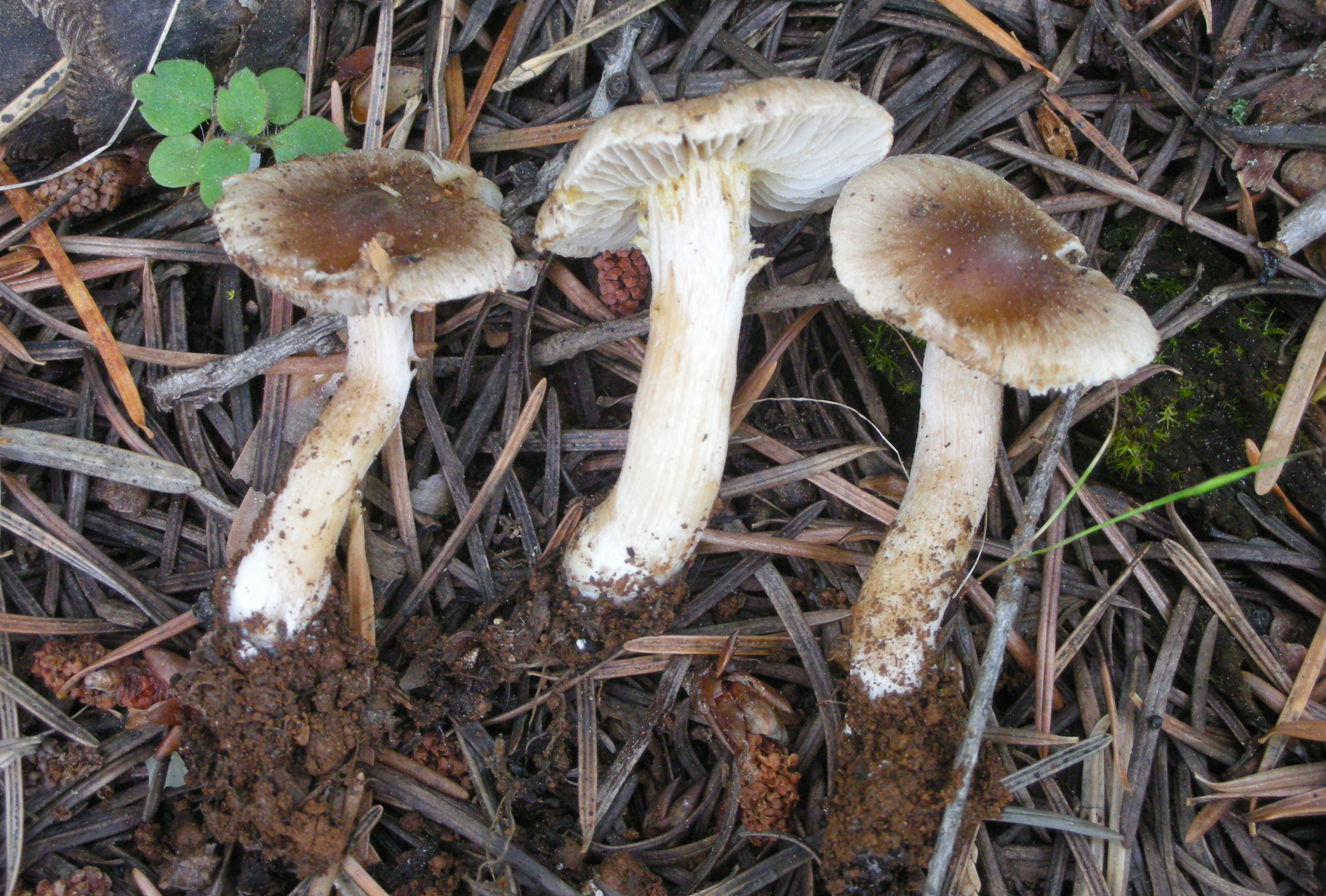
I. lacera (6)

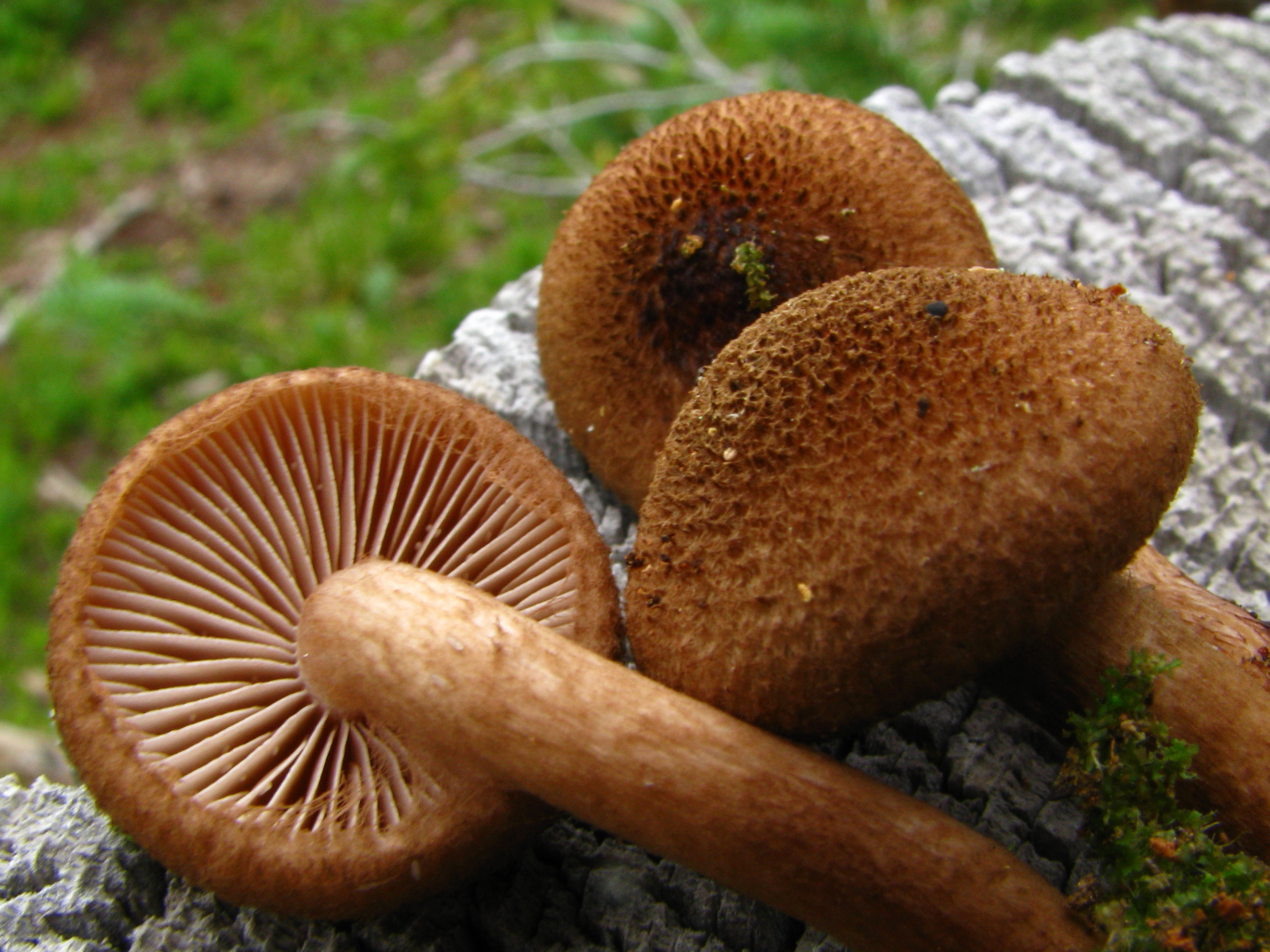
I. flocculosa (7)

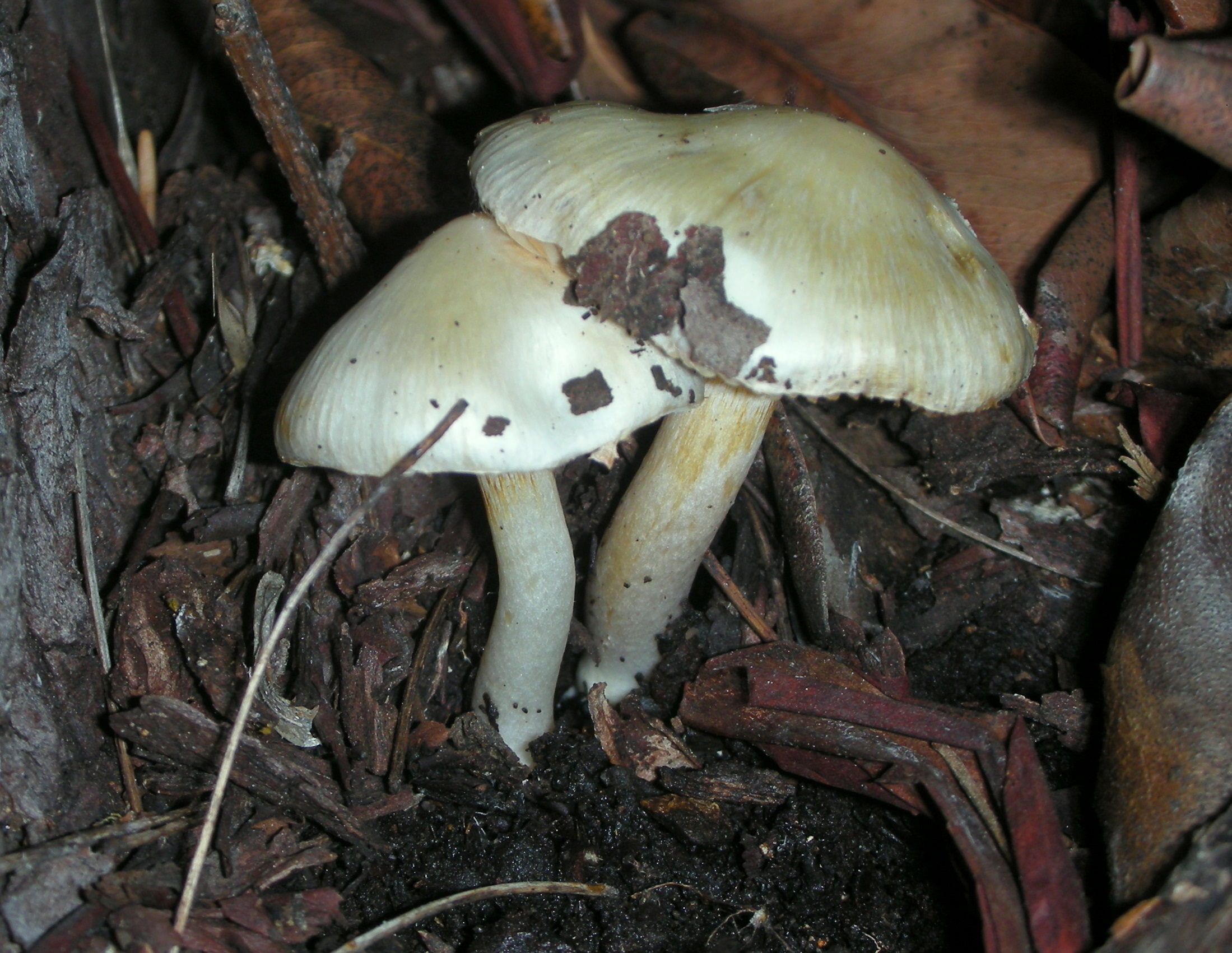
I. geophylla (7)

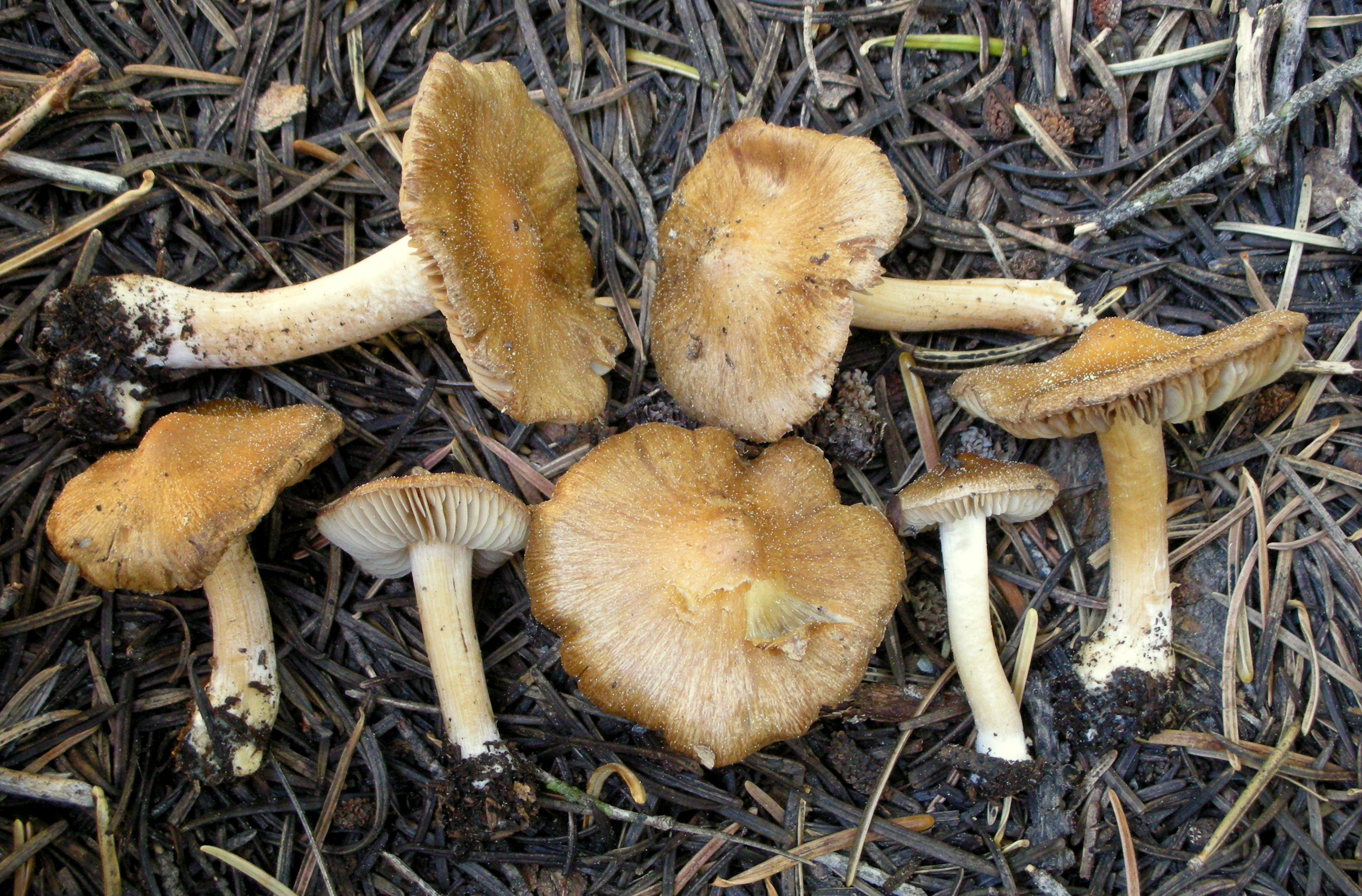
I. virgatula (7)

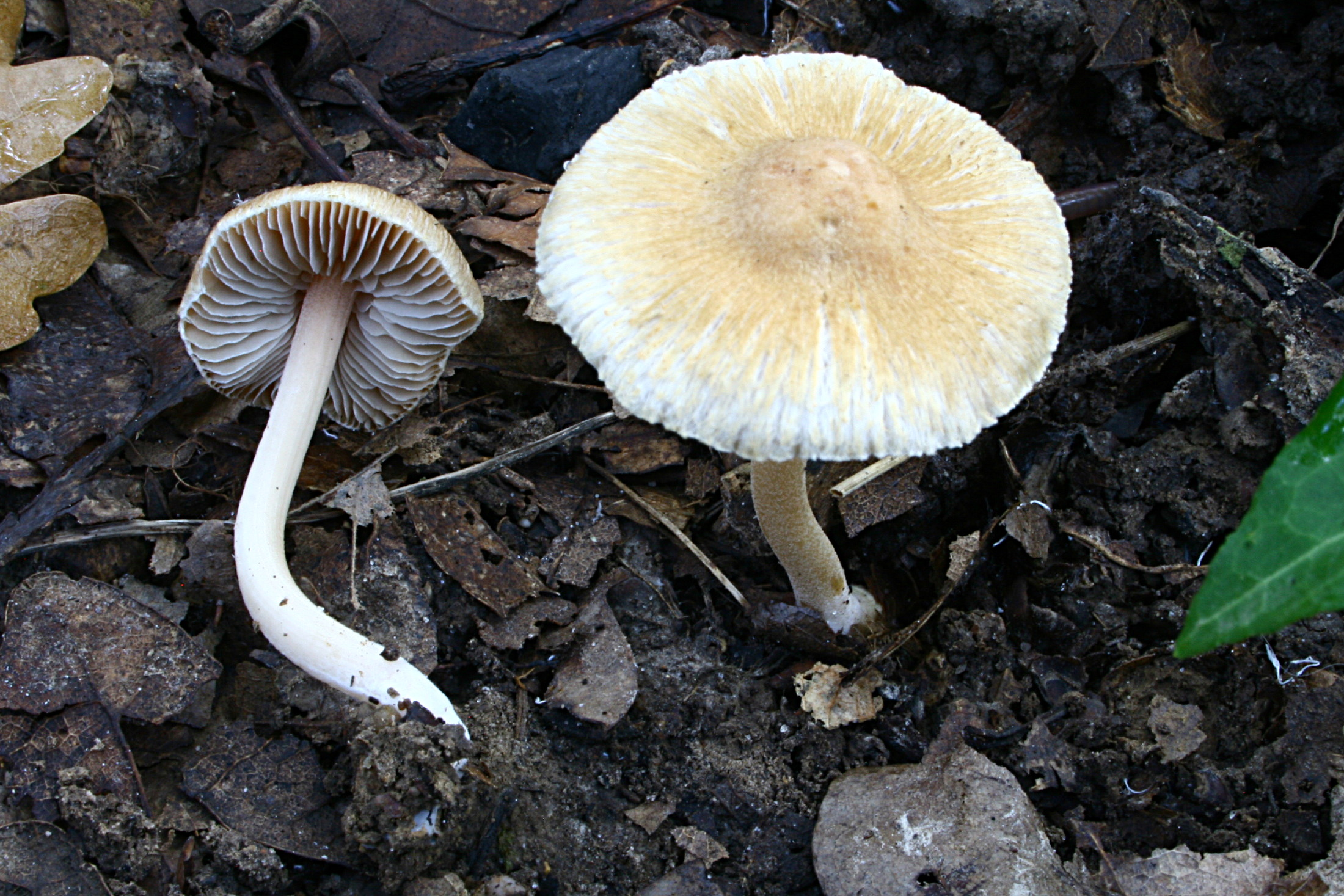
I. hirtella (8)

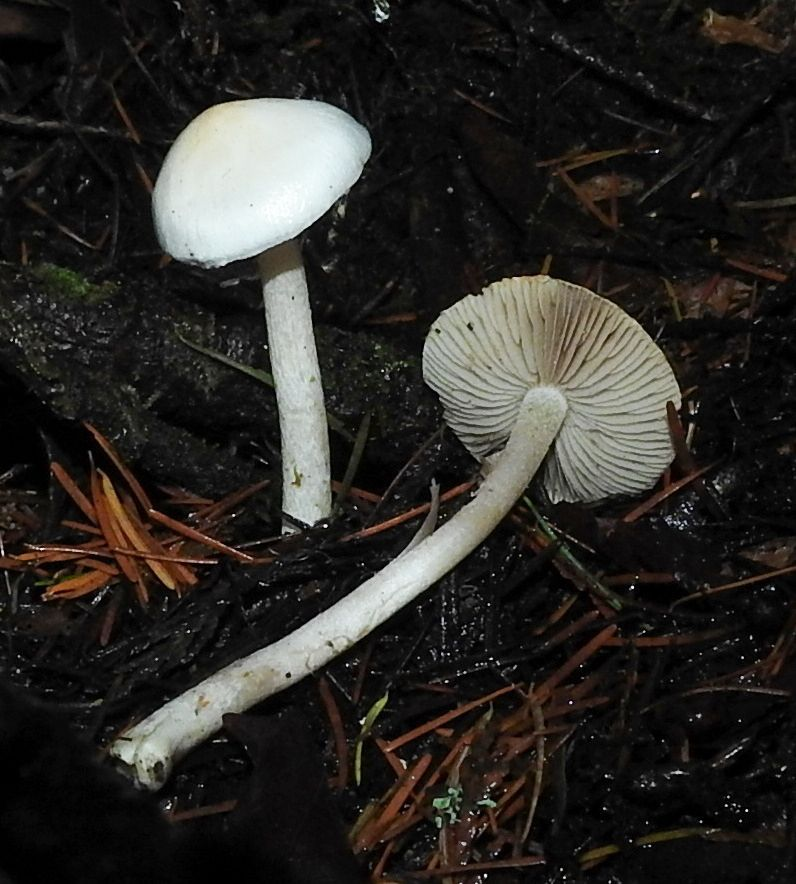
I. sindonia (8)
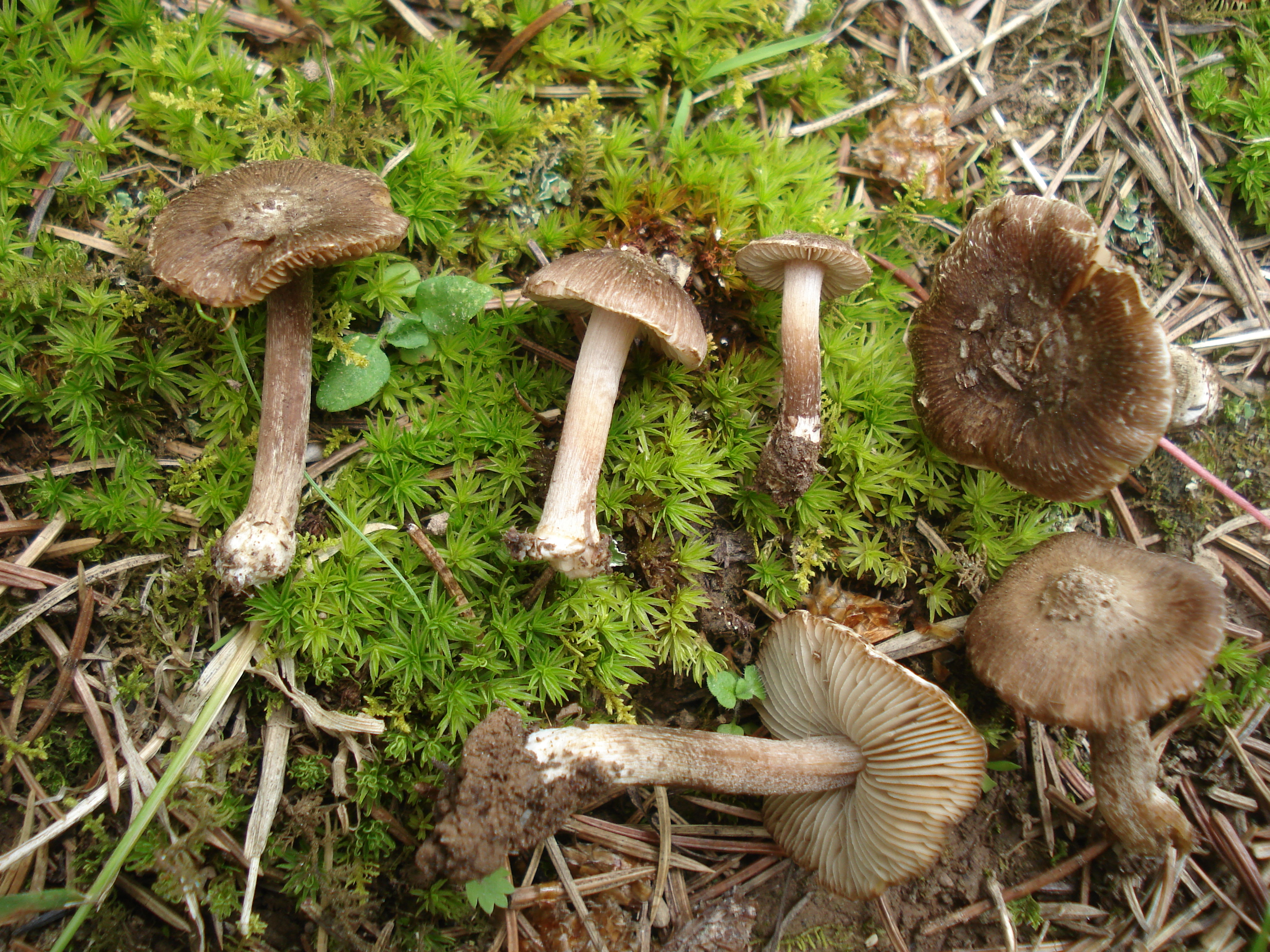
I. assimilata (9)

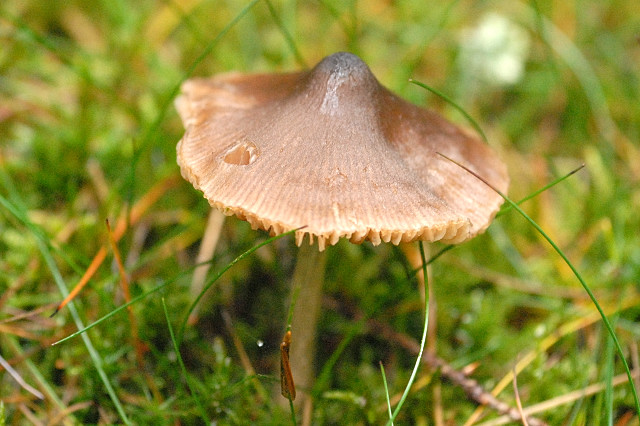
I. lanuginosa (9)

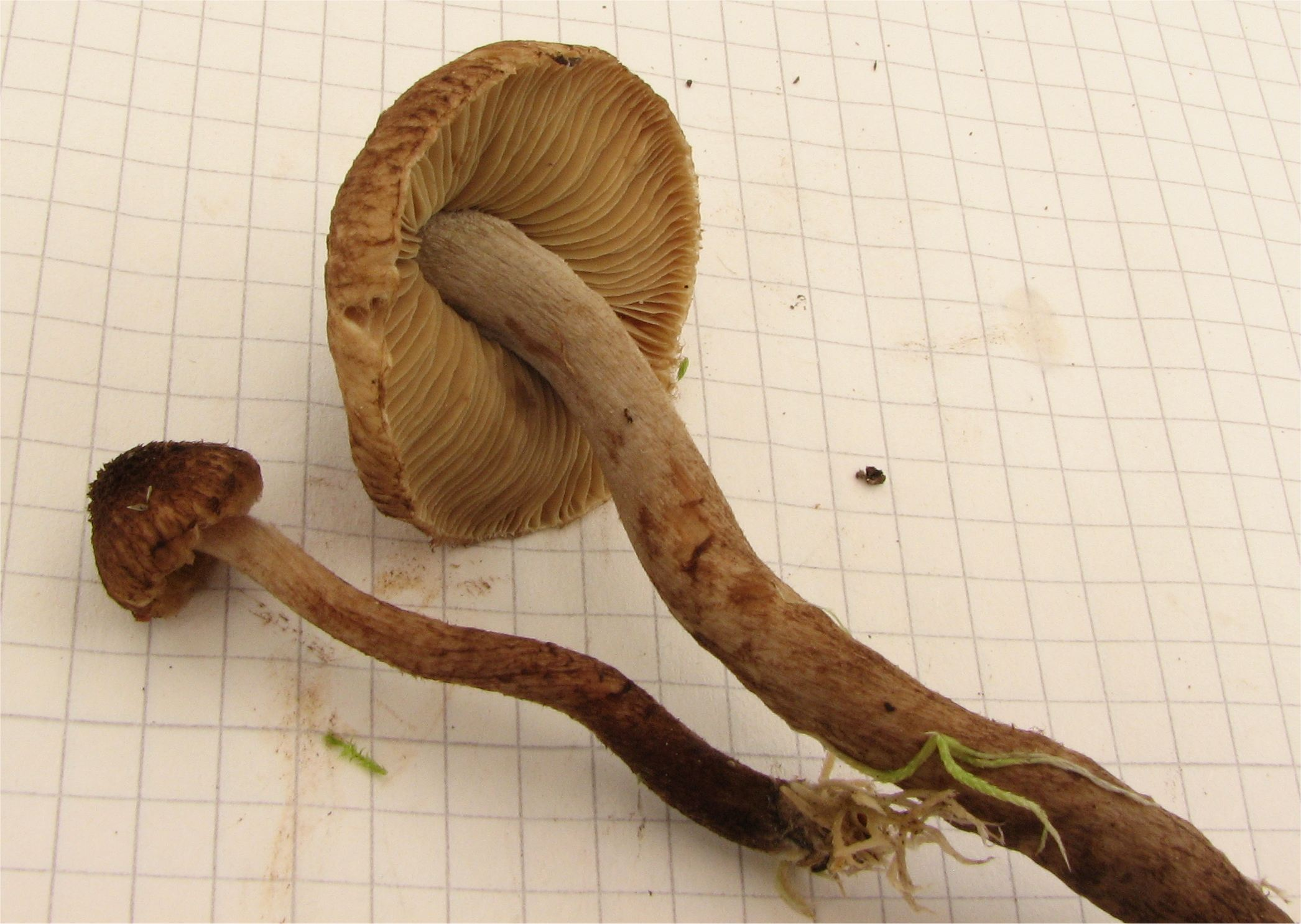
I. relicina (9)

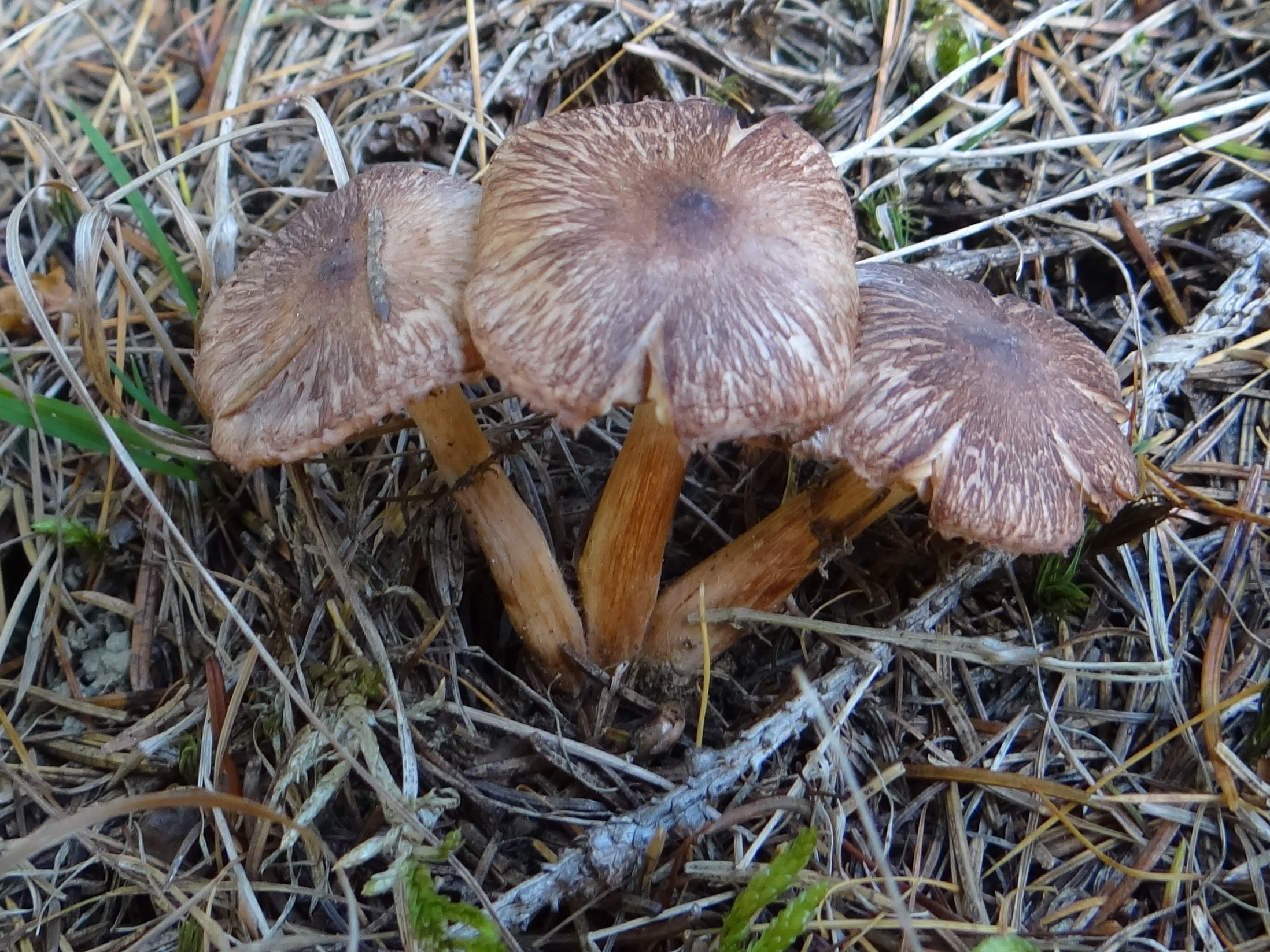
I. asterospora (10)

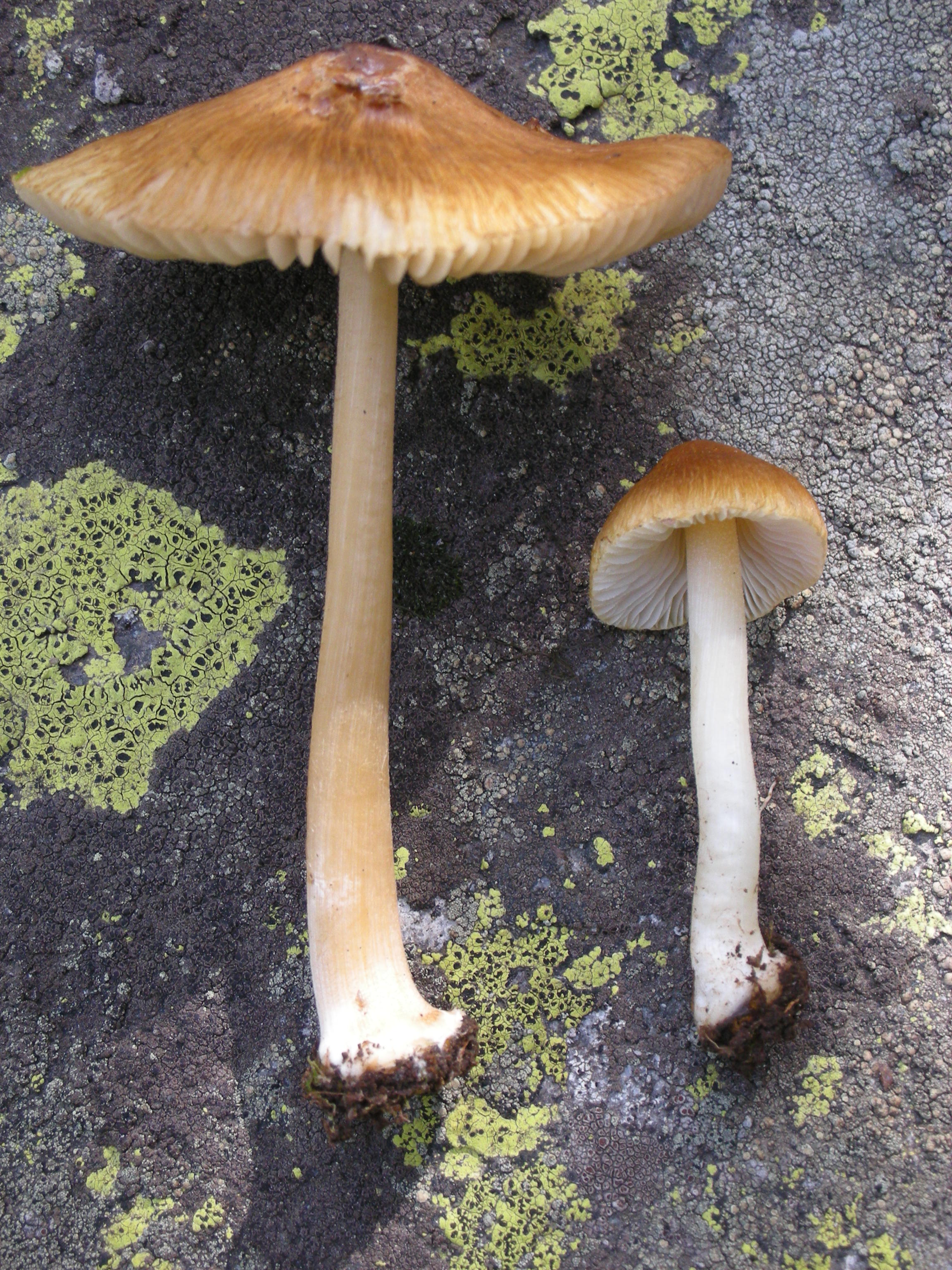
I. praetervisa (10)

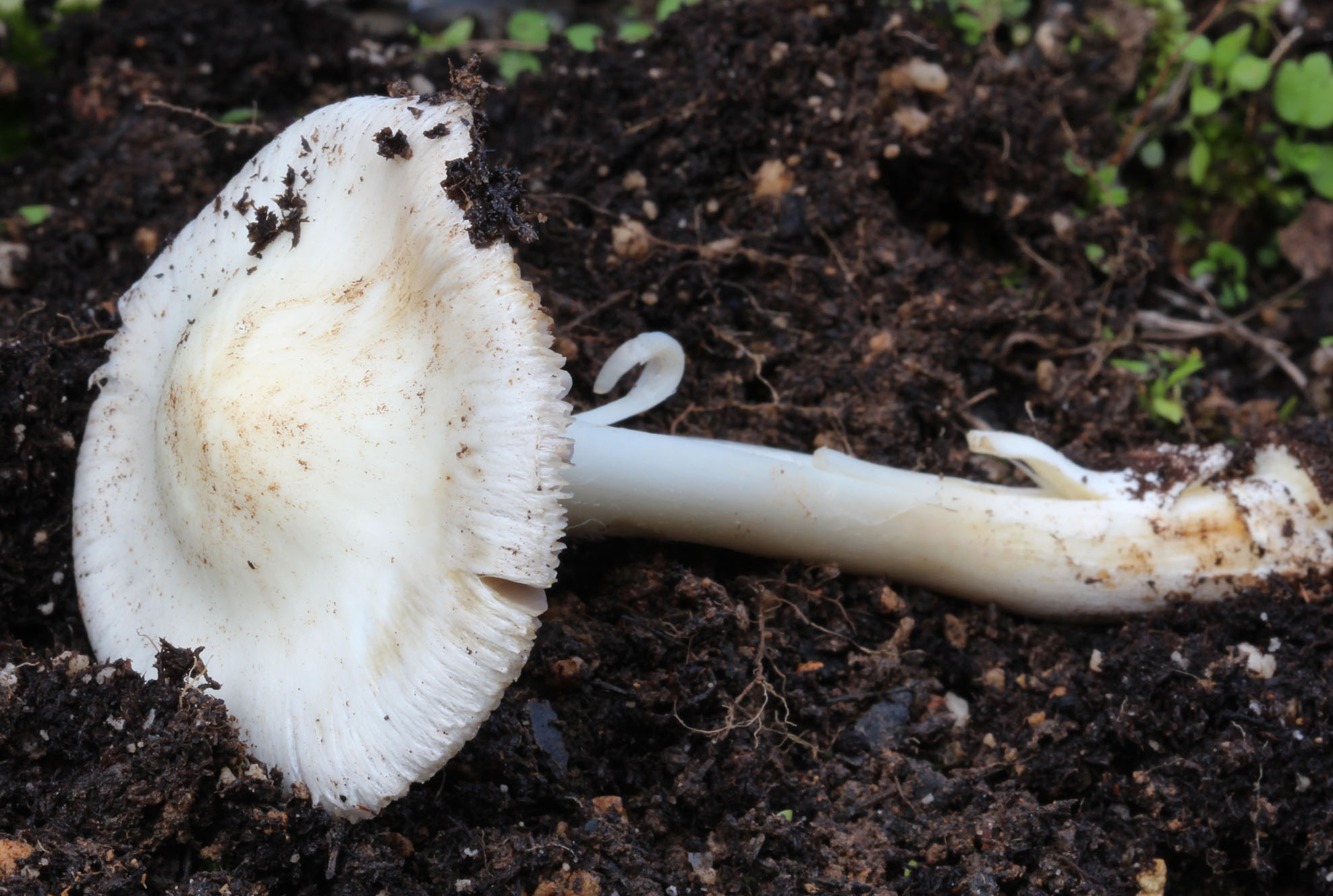
I. fibrosa (11)

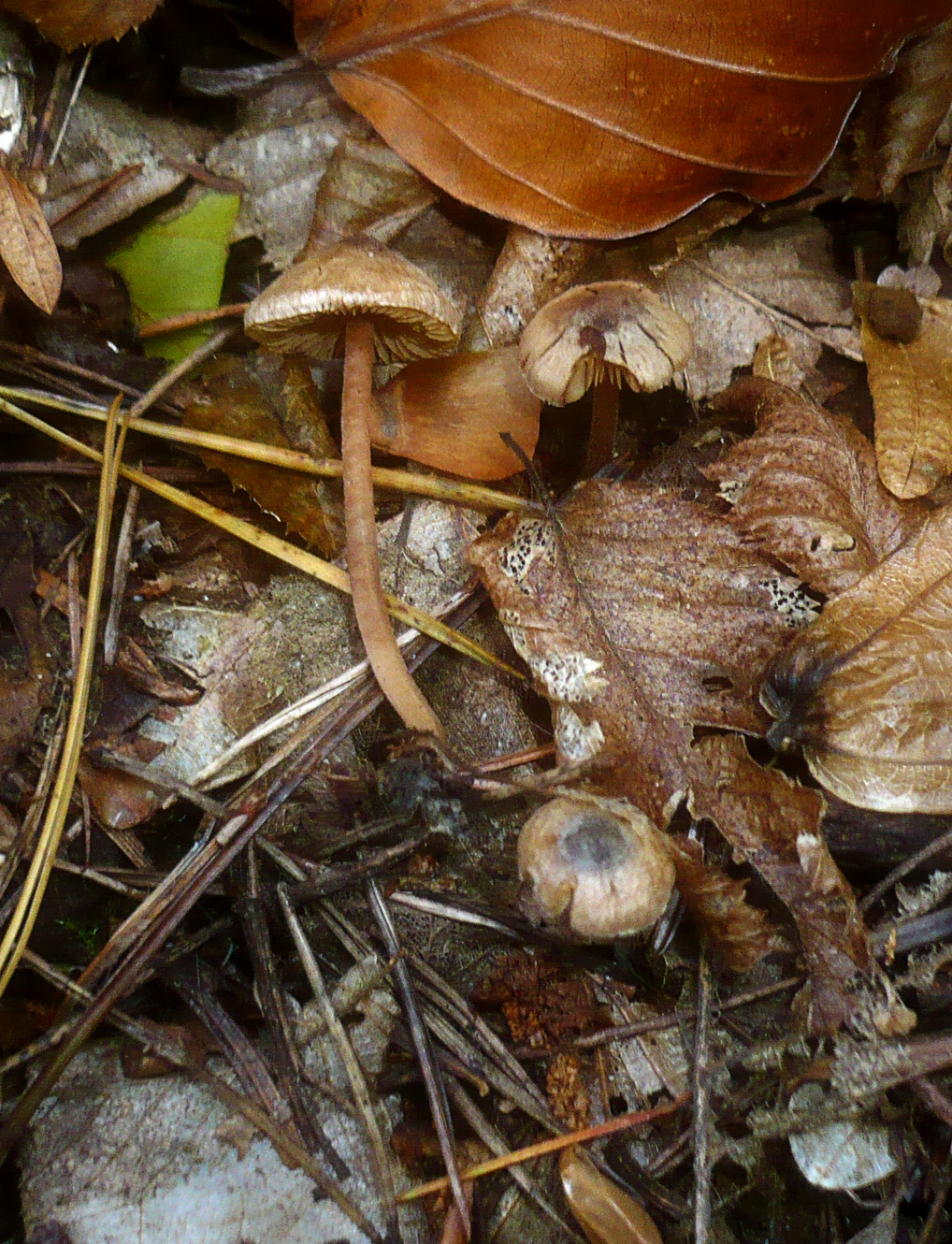
I.petiginosa (11)
