= Inocybe tricolor =

Scientific classification
- Domain: Eukaryota
- Kingdom: Fungi
- Division: Basidiomycota
- Class: Agaricomycetes
- Order: Agaricales
- Family: Inocybaceae
- Genus: Inocybe
- Species: I. tricolor

Binomial name
- Inocybe tricolor Kühner (1955)

Synonyms
- Inocybe corydalina var. tricolor (Kühner) Krieglst. (1991)

Species of mushroom

Inocybe tricolor Mycological characteristics
- Gills on hymenium
- Cap is flat or umbonate
- Hymenium is adnate
- Stipe is bare
- Spore print is tan to yellow
- Ecology is mycorrhizal
- Edibility is psychoactive

Inocybe tricolor is a rare member of the genus Inocybe that is widely distributed in temperate forests. It is a small mycorrhizal mushroom that contains the hallucinogens psilocybin and psilocin. Inocybe tricolor is found under Norway spruce in central Europe.

== Description ==
- Cap: Brick red to chocolate brown, lighter towards the margin, convex to umbonate, with a fibrillose to squamulose cap. Usually less than 4 cm across and has incurved margin until very mature.
- Gills: adnate and very numerous, pale cream brown to yellowish tan.
- Spores: Smooth and ellipsoid to oval, measuring 7.5 x 4.5 micrometres, ochre to tan brown.
- Stipe: 2.5–6 cm long, 4 to 6 mm thick, and is equal width for the whole length, sometimes with some swelling at the base.

== See also ==
- List of Inocybe species
