= Muscarine =

- Chemical structure of muscarine

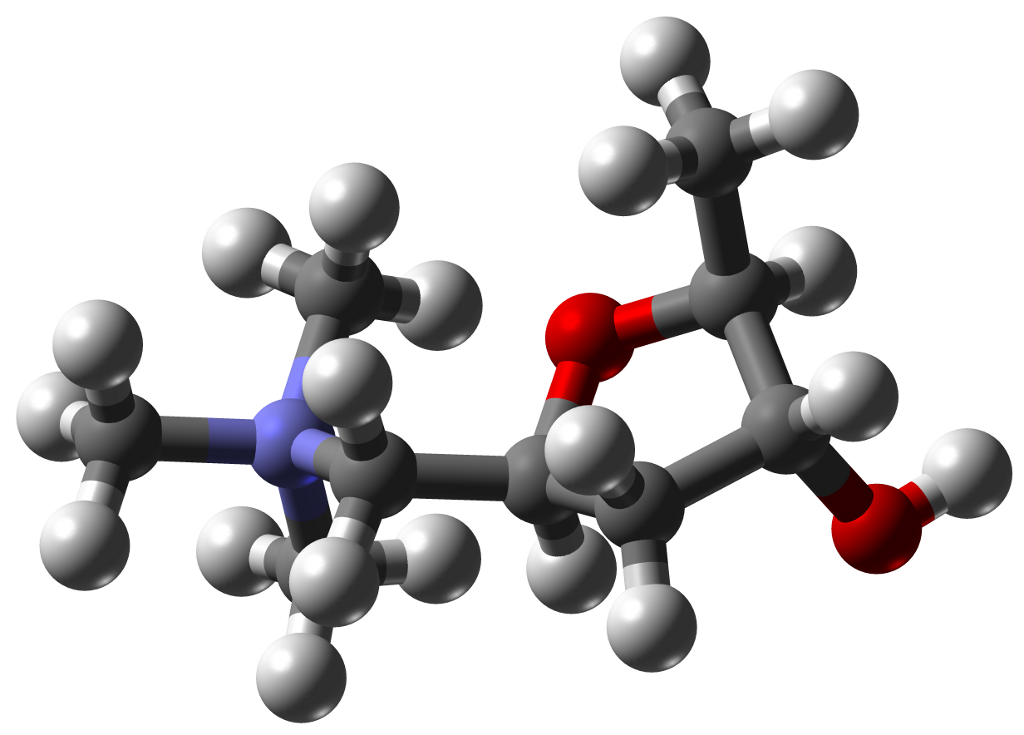

Names
- IUPAC name 2,5-Anhydro-1,4,6-trideoxy-6-(trimethylazaniumyl)-D-ribo-hexitol
- Systematic IUPAC name 1-[(2S,4R,5S)-4-Hydroxy-5-methyloxolan-2-yl]-N,N,N-trimethylmethanaminium
- Other names L-(+)-muscarine, muscarin, (2S,4R,5S)-(4-hydroxy-5-methyl-tetrahydrofuran-2-ylmethyl)-trimethyl-ammonium

Identifiers
CAS Number	300-54-9
3D model (JSmol)	Interactive image
ChEMBL	ChEMBL12587
ChemSpider	8949
ECHA InfoCard	100.005.541
IUPHAR/BPS	3996
PubChem CID	9308
UNII	7T101UWZ5W
CompTox Dashboard (EPA)	DTXSID50184081
- InChI: InChI=1S/C9H20NO2/c1-7-9(11)5-8(12-7)6-10(2,3)4/h7-9,11H,5-6H2,1-4H3/q+1/t7-,8-,9+/m0/s1 Key: UQOFGTXDASPNLL-XHNCKOQMSA-N; InChI=1/C9H20NO2/c1-7-9(11)5-8(12-7)6-10(2,3)4/h7-9,11H,5-6H2,1-4H3/q+1/t7-,8-,9+/m0/s1 Key: UQOFGTXDASPNLL-XHNCKOQMBJ
- SMILES: O[C@@H]1C[C@H](O[C@H]1C)C[N+](C)(C)C

Properties
Chemical formula	C_{9}H_{20}NO_{2}^{+}
Molar mass	174.26 g/mol
- Except where otherwise noted, data are given for materials in their standard state (at 25 °C [77 °F], 100 kPa). verify (what is ?) Infobox references

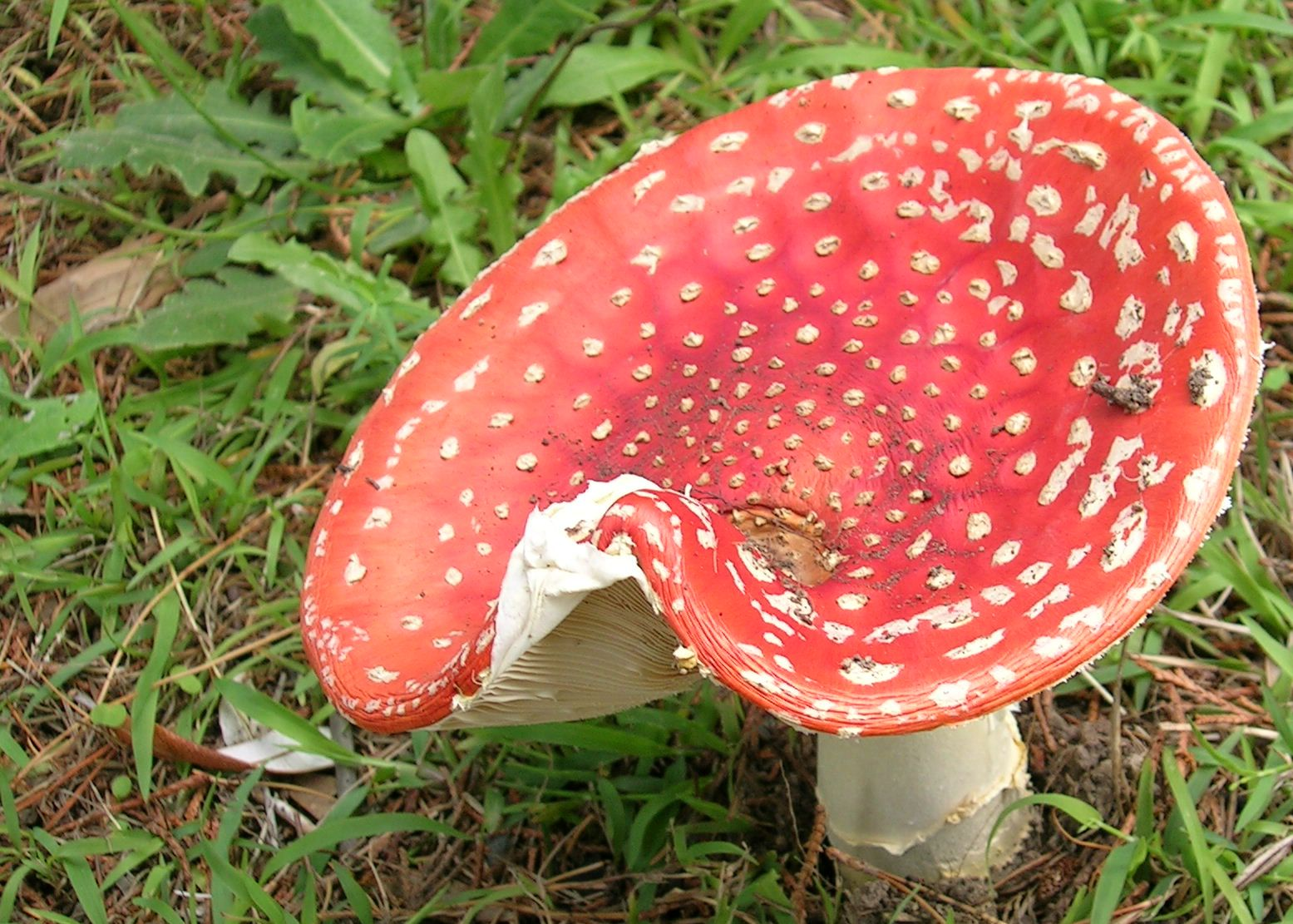
Amanita muscaria

Muscarine, L-(+)-muscarine, or muscarin is a natural product found in certain mushrooms, particularly in Inocybe and Clitocybe species, such as the potentially deadly C. dealbata. Mushrooms in the genera Entoloma and Mycena have also been found to contain varying levels of muscarine which can be dangerous if ingested. Muscarine has been found in harmless trace amounts in the edible genera Boletus, Hygrocybe, Lactarius and Russula. Trace concentrations of muscarine are also found in preparations of Amanita muscaria, though the more relevant neuroactive compound in this context is the gabaergic alkaloid muscimol. A. muscaria fruitbodies contain a variable but low dose of muscarine, usually around 0.0003% of total fresh weight. Highly toxic Inocybe and Clitocybe species contain muscarine concentrations up to 1.6%.

Muscarine is a selective agonist of the muscarinic acetylcholine receptors.

== History ==
The name muscarine derives from that of Amanita muscaria, from which it was first isolated, by German chemists Oswald Schmiedeberg and Richard Koppe at the University of Tartu, who reported their findings in 1869. The mushroom's specific name in turn comes from the Latin musca for fly because the mushroom was often used to attract and kill flies, hence the common name, "fly agaric".

Muscarine was the first parasympathomimetic substance ever studied. It causes profound activation of the peripheral parasympathetic nervous system that may end in circulatory collapse and death. Being a quaternary ammonium salt, muscarine is less completely absorbed from the gastrointestinal tract than tertiary amines, and it does not cross the blood–brain barrier, thus being peripherally selective. Muscarinic agonists activate muscarinic receptors while nicotinic agonists activate nicotine receptors. Both are direct-acting cholinomimetics; they produce their effects by binding to and activating cholinergic receptors. Final proof of the structure was given by Franz Jellinek and colleagues in 1957 with the help of X-ray crystallography; Jellinek was able to further describe the three-dimensional structure of the molecule. These new findings set into motion research on the pharmacology of muscarine and muscarine-like substances that are structurally related to acetylcholine.

== Structure and reactivity ==
Muscarine mimics the function of the natural neurotransmitter acetylcholine in the muscarinic part of the cholinergic nervous system, despite the less flexible structure due to the five-membered ring in the molecular skeleton. With the exception of the double bonded oxygen, all of the acetylcholine structure is present in the right bottom side of muscarine (see Figure 3 below for comparison of both structures).

There are two steroisomers of muscarine: 2S-muscarine and 2R-muscarine.

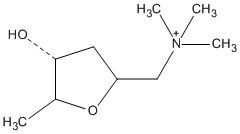
Figure 1. The structural formula of 2S-muscarine.

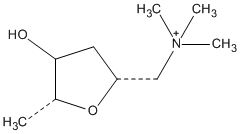
Figure 2. The structural formula of 2R-muscarine.

Figure 3. Acetylcholine for comparison.

=== Efficient synthesis of (+)-muscarine ===
The scheme below represents a very efficient way of the synthesis of (+)-muscarine according to the scientists Chan and Li in the Canadian journal of Chemistry in 1992. S-(−)-Ethyl lactate (2)(Figure 4) is converted into the 2,6-dichlorobenzyl ether (3). Diisobutylaluminium hydride (DIBAL) reduction of the 2,6-dichlorobenzyl ether gives the aldehyde (4). Treatment of the crude aldehyde with allyl bromide and zinc powder in water with NH_{4}Cl as catalyst resulted in an anti:syn mixture of 5a and 5b. Treatment of 5a with iodine in CH_{3}CN at 0 °C gives the cyclized product 6a. Finally treatment of 6a with excess trimethylamine in ethanol gave (+)-muscarine (2S,4R,5S). A similar reaction sequence with 5b gave (+)-epimuscarine (7).

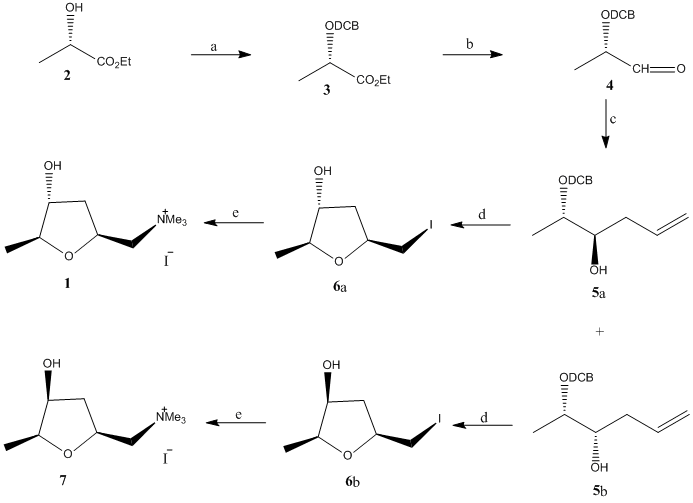
Figure 4. Scheme of the synthesis of (+)-muscarine.

=== Other Syntheses ===
It can be synthesized in various ways from completely different substances.

== Mode of action ==
Muscarine mimics the action of the neurotransmitter acetylcholine by agonising muscarinic acetylcholine receptors. These receptors were named after muscarine, to differentiate them from the other acetylcholine receptors (nicotinic receptors), which are comparatively unresponsive to muscarine. There are five different types of muscarinic receptors: M_{1}, M_{2}, M_{3}, M_{4} and M_{5}. Most tissues express a mixture of subtypes.

The M_{2} and M_{3} subtypes mediate muscarinic responses at peripheral autonomic tissues. M_{1} and M_{4} subtypes are more abundant in brain and autonomic ganglia.

The odd numbered receptors, M_{1}, M_{3} and M_{5}, interact with G_{q} proteins to stimulate phosphoinositide hydrolysis and the release of intracellular calcium. Conversely, the even numbered receptors, M_{2} and M_{4}, interact with G_{i} proteins to inhibit adenylyl cyclase, which results in a decrease of intracellular concentration of cyclic adenosine monophosphate (cAMP).

Most agonists for muscarine receptors are not selective for subtypes.

Muscarinic receptors also signal via other pathways, for instance via G beta-gamma complex modulation of potassium channels. This allows muscarine to modulate cellular excitability via the membrane potential.

== Metabolism ==
A paucity of research exists on the metabolism of muscarine in the human body, suggesting this compound is not metabolized by humans. Though there has been extensive research in the field of acetylcholine metabolism by acetylcholinesterase, muscarine is not metabolized by this enzyme, partly explaining the compound's potential toxicity. Muscarine is readily soluble in water. The most likely way for muscarine to leave the blood is via renal clearance; it will eventually leave the body in urine.

== Medical uses ==
Muscarinic agonists are used as drugs in treating glaucoma, postoperative ileus, congenital megacolon, urinary retention and xerostomia. Muscarine is contraindicated in people with diseases that make them susceptible to parasympathetic stimulation, people who have asthma or COPD, or people who have peptic ulcer disease. Also people with an obstruction in the gastrointestinal or urinary tract are not prescribed muscarine because it will aggravate the obstruction, causing pressure to build up that may lead to perforation.

== Efficacy ==
As muscarine works on the muscarinic acetylcholine receptor, the best comparison can be made with acetylcholine, which normally works on this receptor. Pure muscarine compared to pure acetylcholine is stated in most cases to be more potent, its action is always slower but longer lasting than acetylcholine. A possible explanation for this long-lasting behavior might be that muscarine does not get hydrolyzed by acetylcholinesterase in the synaptic cleft.

== Toxicology and antidote ==
Muscarine poisoning is characterized by miosis, blurred vision, increased salivation, excessive sweating, lacrimation, bronchial secretions, bronchoconstriction, bradycardia, abdominal cramping, increased gastric acid secretion, diarrhea and polyuria. If muscarine reaches the brain it can cause tremor, convulsions and hypothermia. Cardiac ventricles contain muscarinic receptors that mediate a decrease in the force of contractions leading to a lower blood pressure. If muscarine is administered intravenously, muscarine can trigger acute circulatory failure with cardiac arrest.

The symptoms of intoxication with mushrooms rich in muscarine, especially Inocybe, are very typical:

The symptoms start early, after one-quarter to two hours, with headache, nausea, vomiting, and constriction of the pharynx. Then salivation, lacrimation, and diffuse perspiration set in, combined with miosis, disturbed accommodation, and reduced vision. Gastric and small bowel colic leads to diarrhea, and there is a painful urge for urination. Bronchoconstriction leads to asthmatic attacks and severe dyspnea, and bradycardia combined with marked hypotension and vasodilation results in circulatory shock. Death after 8 to 9 hours has been reported in about 5% of the cases, but can be avoided completely by prompt administration of IV or IM anticholinergic drugs.
