= Tassili Mushroom Figure =

Neolithic cave art found in Algeria

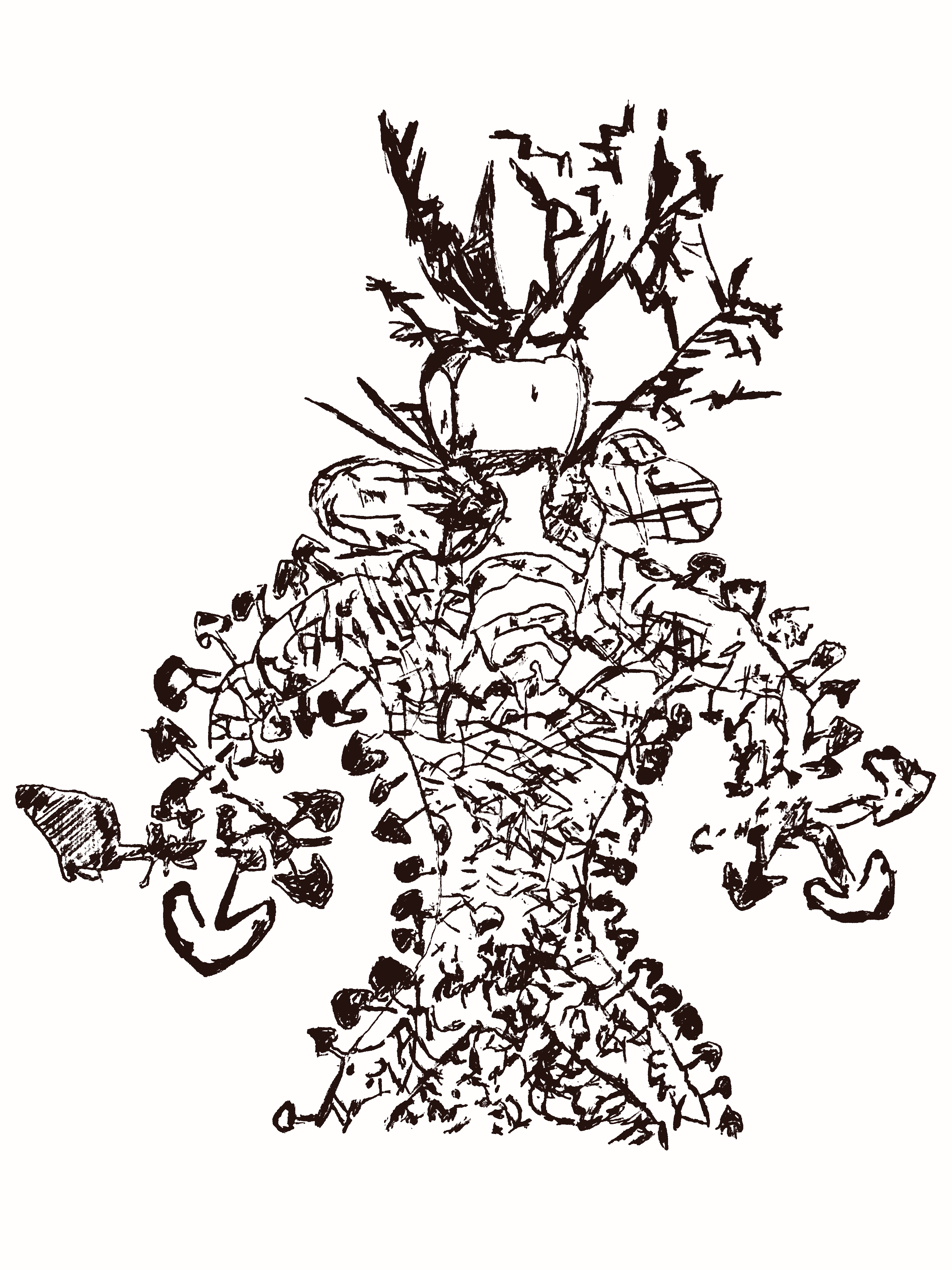
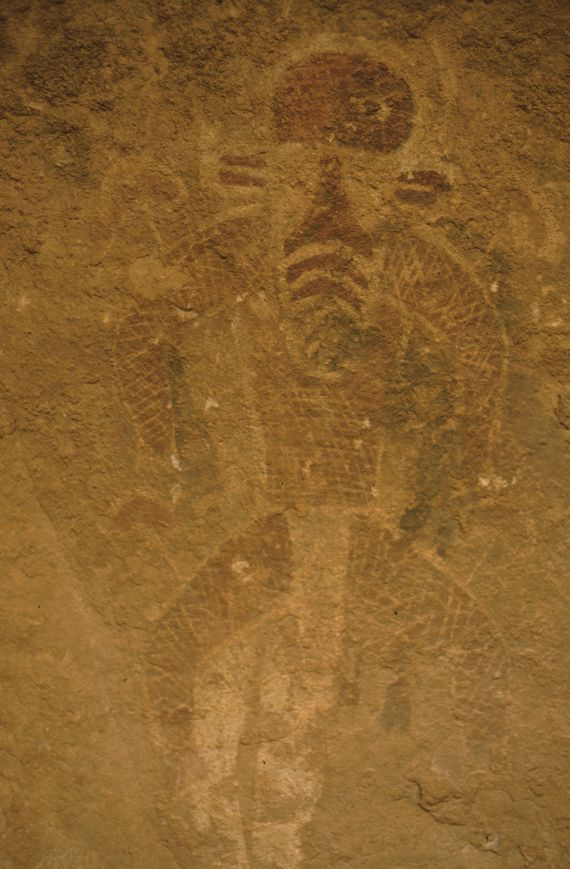
On the left, drawing of the grooves of one of the most famous petroglyphs, an anthropomorphic figure with mask. It was called by Terence McKenna the "bee-faced mushroom shaman". However, this popular image is a later artistic interpretation rather than a direct reproduction of the original rock art. It is not certain whether the figure represents a shaman, mushrooms, or other naturalistic or symbolic elements. On the right, photo of a similar painting that also contains mushroom-like elements.

The popularly called Tassili mushroom figures are Neolithic petroglyphs and cave paintings discovered in Tassili n'Ajjer, Algeria.

Some researchers have suggested that certain features of these images may represent mushrooms, though interpretations remain disputed and alternative explanations have been proposed, including that they may represent sheep. The idea that these figures depict mushrooms and have shamanic connotations was first popularised in Terence McKenna's book Food of the Gods (1992).

It is possibly the oldest example of rock art cited as evidence for the ritual use of fungi in prehistory, with Tassili being the first site that may contain representations of the genus Psilocybe (the second example is at the Spanish archaeological site of Selva Pascuala). However, it is not known whether the original artists intended to depict mushrooms or any specific natural or cultural elements, and the interpretation remains controversial.

== Discovery ==
The discovery of prehistoric rock art at the Tassili n'Ajjer archaeological site occurred throughout the 1910s, 1930s, and into the 1960s. The popularizer of these figures in particular was Henri Lhote (in publications of 1968, 1973), who associated them with specialized shamanic ceremonies, hypothesizing that their caves served as sacred sanctuaries. However, these artworks had already been discovered by local Tuaregs and French Lieutenant Charles Brenans, who documented some of the paintings between 1933 and 1938. Lhote was a member of Brenans' team and gathered his notes. Afterwards, Lhote returned to the site on new expeditions, between 1956 and 1962; Jean-Dominique Lajoux was a photographer for Lhote's Sahara expeditions. Lhote's descriptive approach has been criticized for reducing the art to religious interpretations and for popularizing terms such as "Martians" or "Great Gods" among archaeologists to refer to the round-headed figures at Tassili.

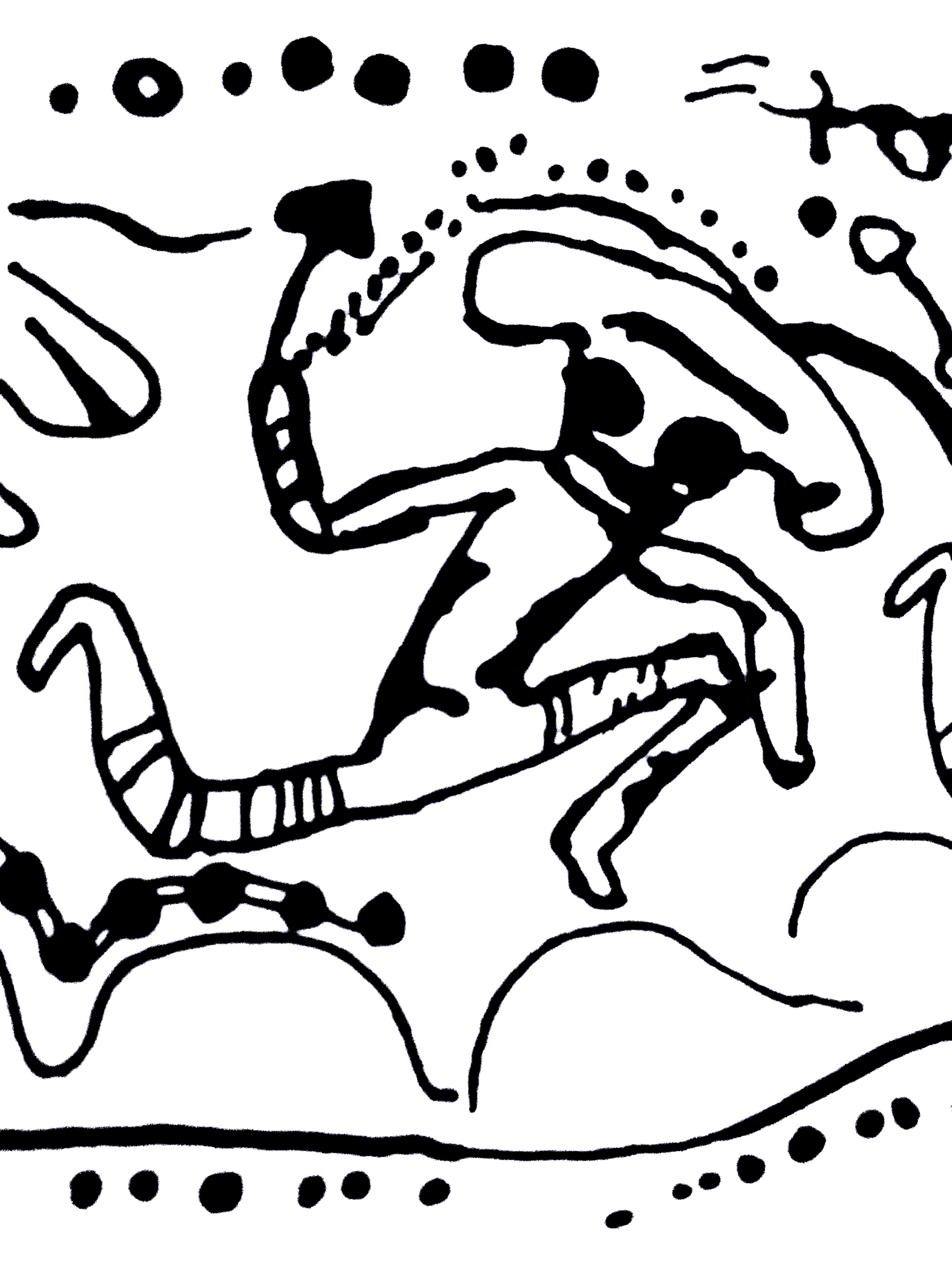
One of the Tassili figures referred to as having a mushroom-shaped head and supposedly holding a mushroom.

The mushroom-like silhouette type has been variously interpreted by researchers as an arrowhead, oar (according to ethnographer Fabrizio Mori, 1975), a vegetable (probably a flower, according to Henri Lhote), or an undefined enigmatic symbol. In one of the panels, several masked anthropomorphic figures appear to be dancing and holding mushroom-like objects. A publication by the US Forest Service has noted that "The oldest known petroglyph depicting the use of psychoactive mushrooms comes from the rock shelters at Tassili n'Ajjer" and that "It is postulated that the mushrooms depicted on the 'mushroom shaman' are Psilocybe mushrooms." Other drawings with mushroom-like features appear on petroglyphs in the region.

The ethnobotanist Giorgio Samorini characterized these figures as possibly the oldest physical evidence of entheomycological practices (the use of psychedelic mushrooms), reflecting altered states of consciousness and dance rituals, based on the posture of certain figures. Mycologist Gastón Guzmán suggested that the mushrooms in the paintings resemble species such as Psilocybe mairei, but also other African mushrooms like P. cubensis, P. aquamarina, and P. natalensis.

However, recent scholarship has questioned the shamanistic interpretation and cautions against assuming that certain features of the images correspond directly to pre-existing anthropological categories, which may not be universally applicable across cultures. Ethnomycologist Brian Akers (PhD) has noted that it is uncertain whether the Tassili figures are indeed the oldest depictions of mushrooms, and that questions remain regarding their dating, scientific peer review, and stylistic interpretation, which is often far from naturalistic and can be quite abstract. He also points out that Tassili art has become an iconic symbol within 1990s psychedelic culture and has been linked to various fringe theories such as the "Ancient Psychonaut Theory" and the Ancient Astronaut Theory.

The well-known "mushroom shaman" image popularized by Terence McKenna in his 1992 book Food of the Gods is a drawing made by McKenna's then-wife, Kat Harrison. Harrison never saw the original painting in person and worked from a photograph in a book, filling in areas she considered damaged or incomplete. The drawing emphasizes a supernatural figure covered with mushrooms, but whether this was the original artist's intention remains unresolved. Earlier archaeologists have even proposed alternative interpretations, such as the figure representing a sheep-man.

== See also ==
- Mushrooms in art
