= Jebel Azao =

Mountain in southeastern Algeria

- Adrar Afao
- Location within Algeria

Highest point
- Elevation: 2,158 m (7,080 ft)
- Coordinates: 25°12′12″N 8°07′22″E

Geography
- Parent range: Tassili n'Ajjer

Jebel Azao or Adrar Afao, at 2,158 metres (7,080 ft), is the highest peak in the Tassili n'Ajjer range in southeastern Algeria. The range forms the northwest border of the Chad Basin.

== Geography ==
The Jebel Azao is a peak in the Adrar massif of the Tassili N'Ajjer, a sandstone plateau to the northeast of the Hoggar Mountains The mountain forms a ridge on the plateau, roughly parallel to the escarpment. The massif is mainly made of sandstone, which has resulted in the formation of many natural rock arches. Mt. Afao is drained by various wadis, which converge on the Wadi Imirhou. This wadi runs northeast, then turns to the northwest and disappears in the Issaouane Erg sands to the west of Illizi.
