= Psilocybe mairei =

Scientific classification
- Kingdom: Fungi
- Division: Basidiomycota
- Class: Agaricomycetes
- Order: Agaricales
- Family: Hymenogastraceae
- Genus: Psilocybe
- Species: P. mairei

Binomial name
- Psilocybe mairei Singer

Synonyms
- Hypholoma cyanescens Maire (basionym); Geophila cyanescens Kühner & Romagn.

Species of fungus

Psilocybe mairei is a species of mushroom in the family Hymenogastraceae. It is found in Algeria and Morocco and contains the psychoactive compound psilocybin. The oldest example of rock art suggesting use of psychedelic mushrooms might depict P. mairei. In 1992 the Italian ethnobotanist Giorgio Samorini reported finding a painted mural from Tassili n'Ajjer in the Sahara desert in southeast Algeria, dated 7000 to 9000 BCE, portraying mushrooms (later tentatively identified as P. mairei).

The species was first described in 1928 by René Maire, collected in the Atlas Mountains above the city of Blida, Algeria under Atlas cedar, and given the name Hypholoma cyanescens. In 1953, it was transferred to the genus Geophilia by Robert Kühner and Henri Romagnesi. In 1973, Rolf Singer recognized it as a Psilocybe, but the name Psilocybe cyanescens was an unavailable name, having been used to describe a different species in 1946. Hence, Singer provided a new species epithet, named in honor of the mycologist who originally described the species.

== See also ==
- List of Psilocybin mushrooms
- Psilocybin mushrooms
- Psilocybe
