= Tassili n'Ajjer =

Sandstone massif in Algeria's central Sahara Desert

UNESCO World Heritage Site
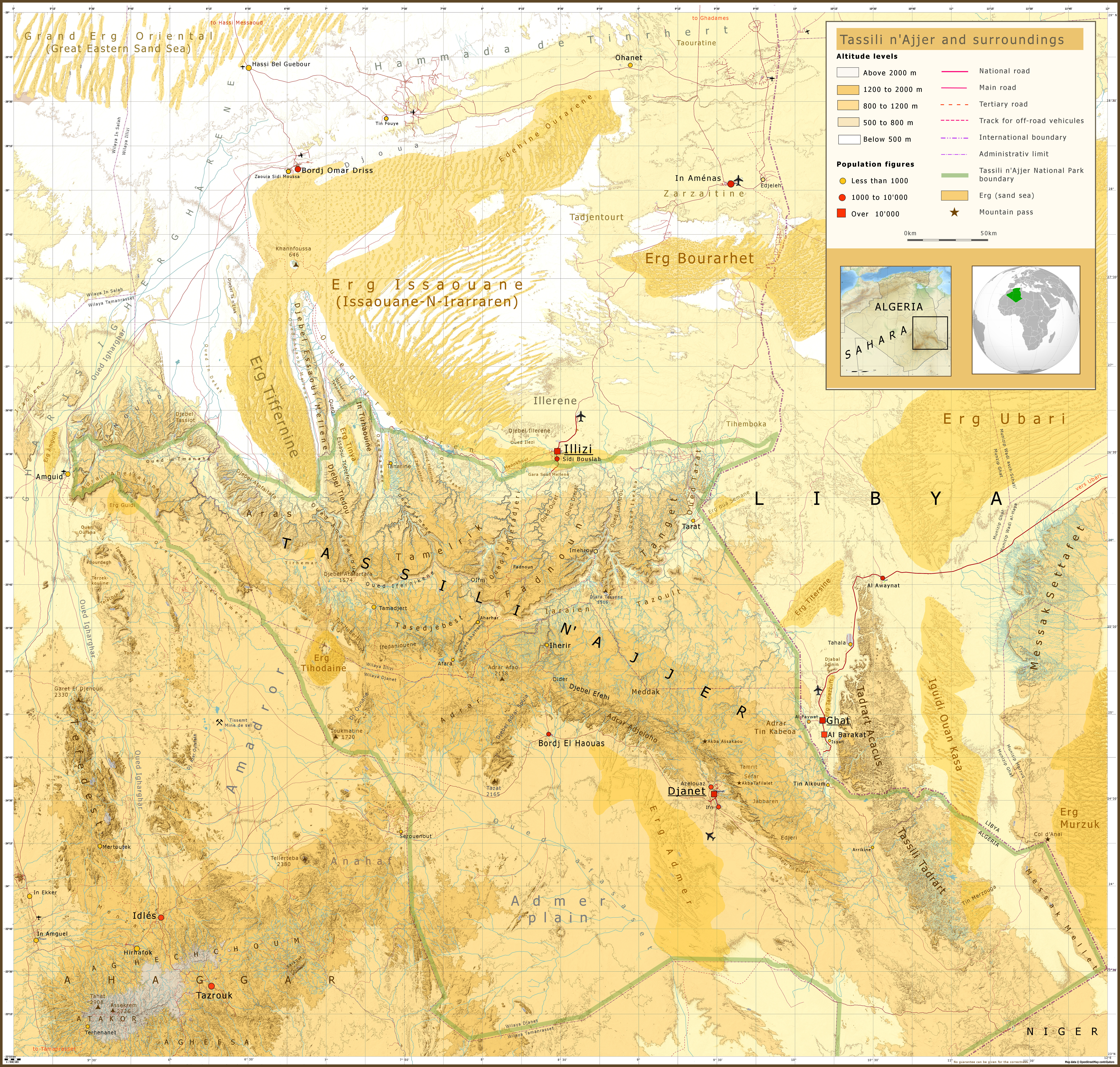
- Map of Tassili n'Ajjer and surroundings

- Location within Algeria
- Location: Algeria
- Includes: Tassili National Park, La Vallée d'Iherir Ramsar Wetland
- Criteria: Cultural and Natural: (i), (iii), (vii), (viii)
- Reference: 179
- Inscription: 1982 (6th Session)
- Area: 7,200,000 ha (28,000 sq mi)
- Coordinates: 25°30′N 9°0′E
- IUCN category II (national park)
- Interactive map of Tassili n'Ajjer
- Location: Djanet Province, Illizi Province Algeria
- Established: 1972
- Disestablished: 2011

Ramsar Wetland
- Official name: La Vallée d'Iherir
- Designated: 2 February 2001
- Reference no.: 1057

Tassili n'Ajjer (Berber: Tassili n Ajjer, Arabic: طاسيلي ناجر, romanized: ṭāssīlī naʾjir; "Plateau of rivers") is a mountain range in the Sahara desert, located in south-eastern Algeria. It holds one of the most important groupings of prehistoric cave art in the world and covers an area of more than 72,000 km^{2} (28,000 sq mi).

The site has been designated a national park and a Biosphere Reserve, and was inducted into the UNESCO World Heritage Site list in 1982.

The literal English translation of Tassili n'Ajjer is 'plateau of rivers'.

== Geography ==
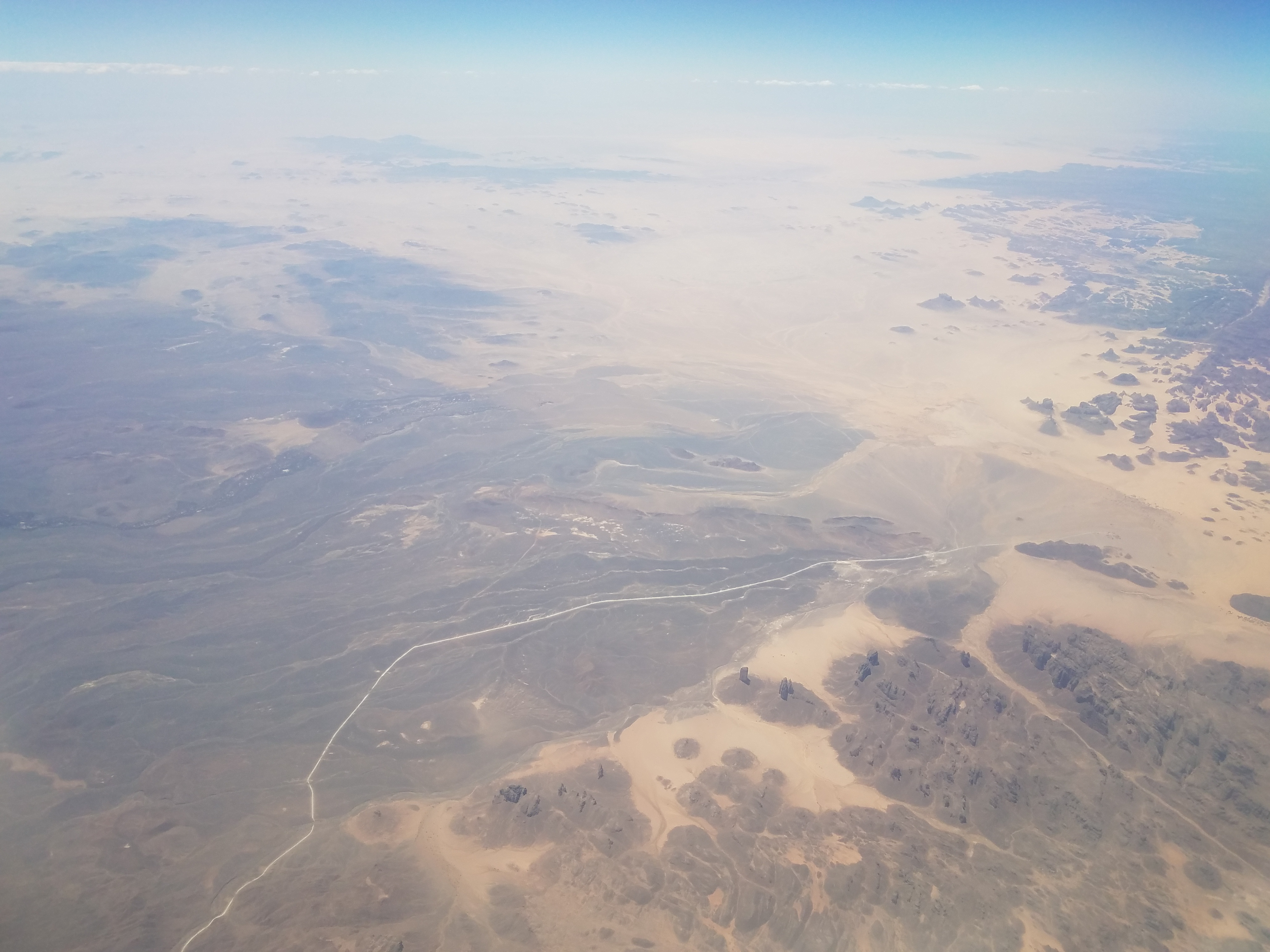
Aerial photograph of Tassili n'Ajjer

Tassili n'Ajjer is a plateau in south-eastern Algeria at the borders of Libya and Niger, covering an area of 72,000 km^{2}. It ranges from 26°20′N 5°00′E east-south-east to 24°00′N 10°00′E. Its highest point is the Adrar Afao that peaks at 2,158 m (7,080 ft), located at 25°10′N 8°11′E. The nearest towns are Djanet on the southeastern edge and Illizi on the northern edge.

The plateau is of great geological and aesthetic interest. Its panorama of geological formations consisting of rock forests, composed of eroded sandstone, resembles a lunar landscape and hosts a range of rock art styles.

== Geology ==
The range is composed largely of sandstone. The sandstone is stained by desert varnish, a thin outer layer of deposited metallic oxides that colour the rock formations variously from near-black to dull red. Erosion in the area has resulted in nearly 300 natural rock arches being formed in the south east, along with deep gorges and permanent water pools in the north.

West African Craton, Tuareg Shield and East Sahara Metacraton

The Tuareg Shield, an accumulation of terranes that formed during the Neoproterozoic era between 750 and 550 million years ago, encompassed the area of today's Ahaggar Mountains in Algeria, the Aïr Mountains in Niger, and the Adrar des Ifoghas in Mali. To the west lies the West African Craton, to the east the Saharan Metacraton. It expanded through accretion in the north and south, so that it also encompassed the area of today's Tassili n'Ajjer. During this epoch, the supercontinent Gondwana formed, which also included all the cratons and shields of what would later become Africa.

During the subsequent Cambrian period (541 to 485 million years ago), the first sediment deposits still present today were formed in the Tassili n'Ajjer region. During this epoch, Gondwana shifted from the equatorial zone to the southern hemisphere, so that the Sahara region was located in the South Pole region during the Upper Ordovician (458 to 443 million years ago). At the end of this period, the 'Hirnantian’ ice age prevailed for a million years. An ice sheet formed, covering much of the northern half of Africa. (Note: In the region west of Ghat, in the Tassili n'Ajjer, flat rock formations with abrasion marks bear witness to the movement of ice during this period. More on this topic:) In the early Silurian period (starting 443 million years ago), the global climate changed, causing the ice of the Tuareg Shield to melt. This left behind meltwater channels that had formed under the ice. This completed the formation of the geological stratigraphy of the Inner Tassili Group. It consists mainly of sandstone and some layers of clay.

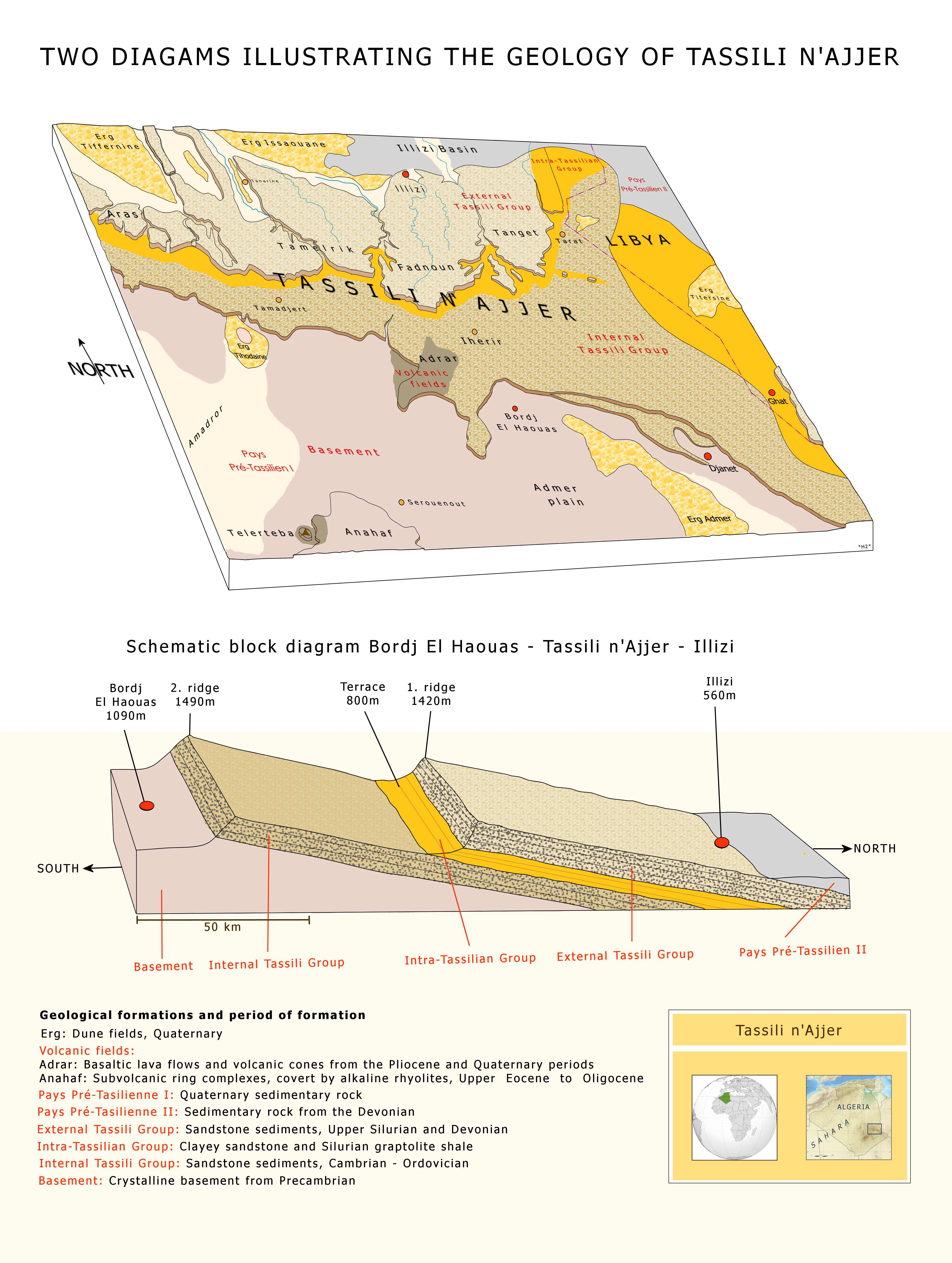
Two diagrams illustrating the geology of Tassili n'Ajjer

During the Silurian and Devonian periods, transgression (the advance of the sea) from the north and northwest covered large areas of the Sahara with further layers of sediment. At that time, the Tassili n'Ajjer was the seabed near the coast, later becoming a fluvial floodplain. During the Silurian period, the stratigraphic sequence of the Intra Tassili Group was formed, which contains a lot of bioturbated clay and some sandstone. During the Devonian period, the formations of the External Tassili Group were formed, which contain a lot of sandstone alongside clays with macrofauna and some limestone. It is primarily from these two stratigraphic sequences of the Silurian and Devonian periods that petroleum and natural gas have been and continue to be extracted in the Illizi Basin, north of Illizi.

During the following 200 million years, this region remained geologically a rather quiet, fairly flat mainland area without major tectonic changes or sedimentation. - Probably as early as the Cretaceous period, but especially since the Miocene (23 to 5,3 million years ago), the Tuareg Shield began to arch as a result of magmatic uplift. The uplift in the Ahaggar region ultimately reached 4,000 to 5,000 m. The Tassili n'Ajjer region was also affected, and the uplift caused its layers to tilt toward the north. Parallel to the uplift, several basins formed north and south of the Tuareg Shield, which now served as deposition areas for the eroded sediment, for example the Illizi Basin. Especially in the Miocene, the sedimentary layers of the External Tassili (the uppermost layer sequence) were completely eroded in the southern and eastern parts of the Tassili n'Ajjer. In the northern part, on the plateau of this layer group, the river systems dug up to 400 m deep into the sandstone and clay layers due to the now greater gradient.

The last major geological change occurred during the Pliocene (5,3 to 2,58 million years ago). Volcanism covered the Adrar region in southwestern Tassili n'Ajjer with craters, volcanic cones, and lava flows. This development continued into the early Quaternary period.

<

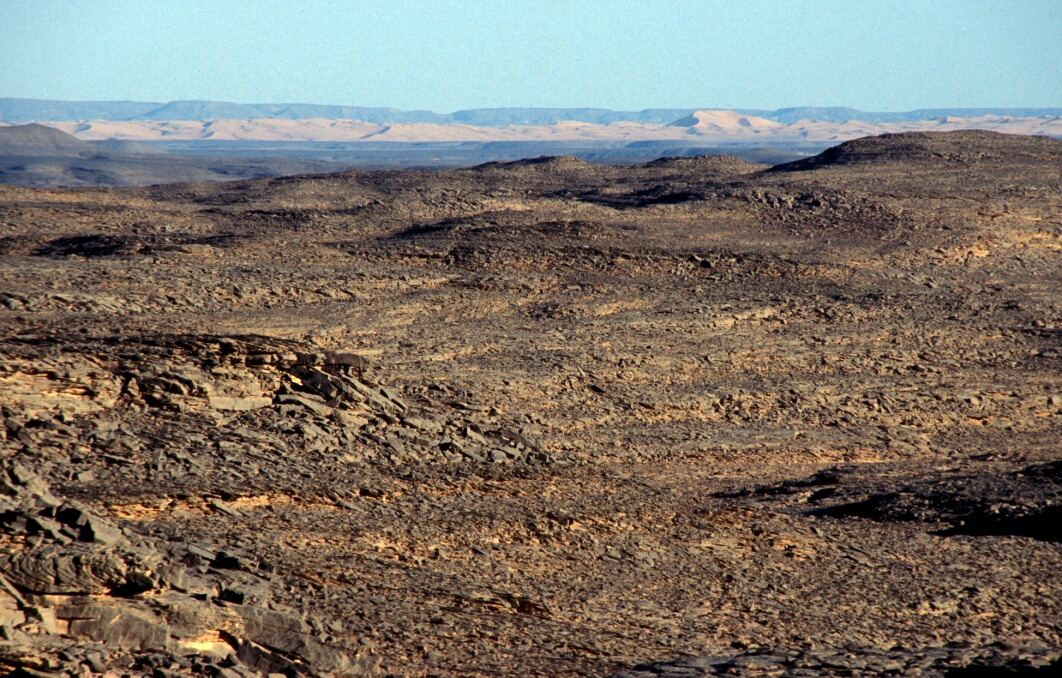
The barren Hamada of the External Tassili south of Illizi

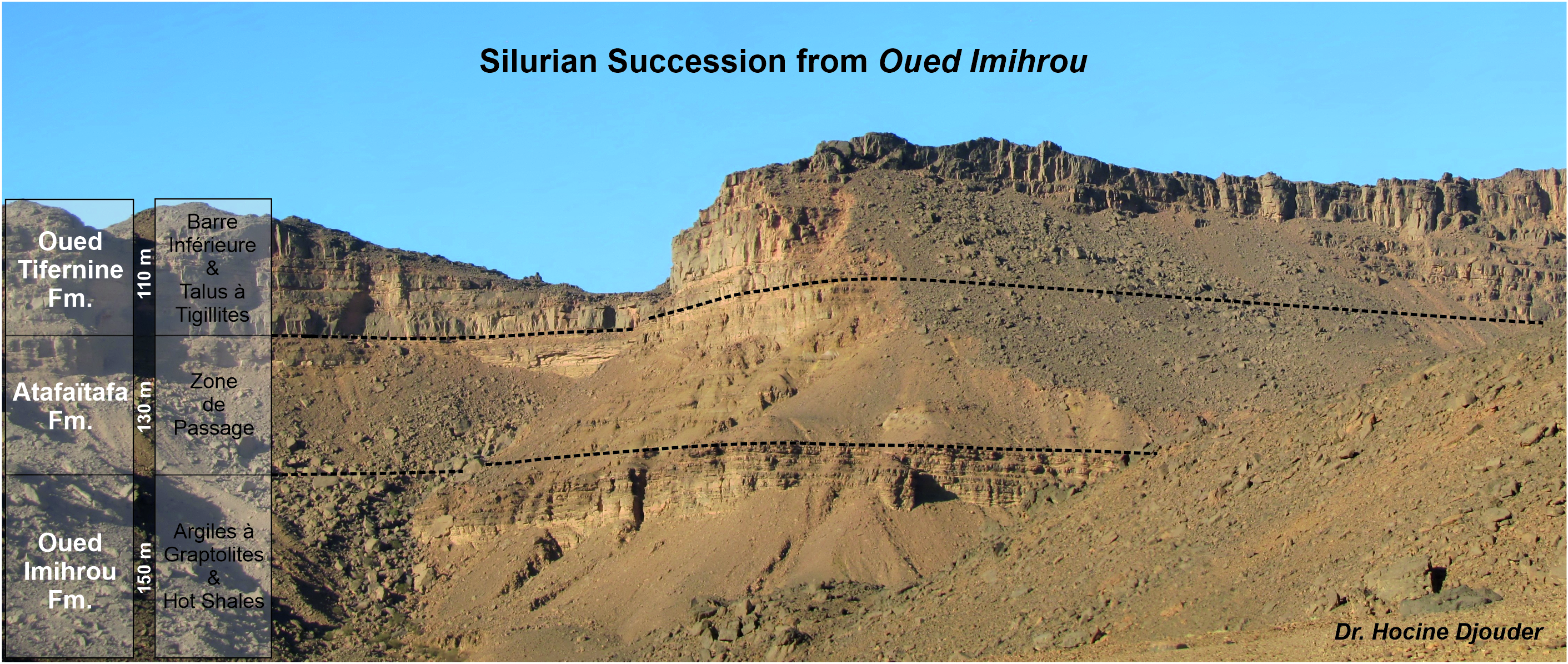
The three formations of the Intra-Tassilian Group from Oued Imihrou

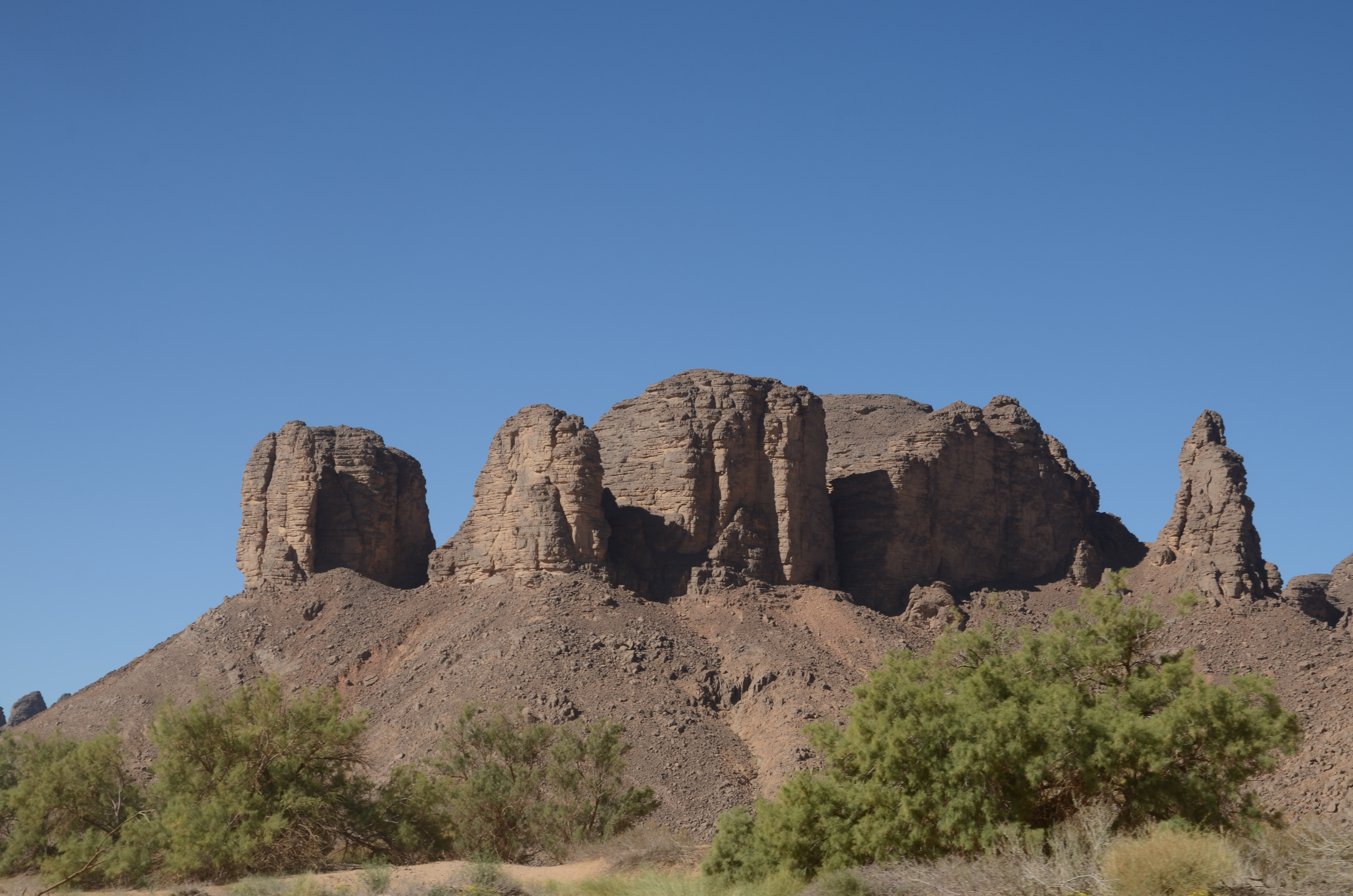
Outpost of the Tassili n'Ajjer in the Oued Essendilène: two formations of the Inner Tassili Group

=== Ecology ===
Tassili n'Ajjer lies within the West Saharan montane xeric woodlands ecoregion. Due to the higher elevation of the area, coupled with the water-retentive properties of the sandstone, the vegetation here is somewhat more lush and verdant than in the lower regions of desert; in turn, this creates an attractive habitat for numerous animal species, from the smallest invertebrates, up the food chain to mammals. The park features an open woodland, primarily consisting of the endangered and endemic Saharan cypress and Saharan myrtle, in its higher-elevation eastern half. The Tassili cypress is one of the longest-living trees and organisms on Earth, after the bristlecone pines of the Western US.

An isolated population of the West African crocodile survived in Tassili n'Ajjer until the twentieth century; today, the species is primarily found in more tropical and sub-Saharan regions of Western and Central Africa, from Senegal to Chad. The aoudad, or Barbary sheep, is the only extant species of animal depicted in the area's ancient rock artwork.

The park has been designated an Important Bird Area (IBA) by BirdLife International because it supports significant populations of spotted, crowned and Lichtenstein's sandgrouse, Pharaoh eagle-owls, greater hoopoe-larks, bar-tailed and desert larks, pale rock martins, fulvous babblers, white-crowned and mourning wheatears, desert sparrows and trumpeter finches.

== Archaeology ==
=== Background ===
Algerian rock art has been subject to European study since 1863, with surveys conducted by "A. Pomel (1893–1898), Stéphane Gsell (1901–1927), G. B. M. Flamand (1892–1921), Leo Frobenius and Hugo Obermaier (1925), Henri Breuil (1931–1957), L. Joleaud (1918–1938), and Raymond Vaufrey (1935–1955)."

Tassili was already well known by the early 20th century, but Westerners were broadly introduced to it through a series of sketches made by French legionnaires, particularly Lieutenant Charles Brenans in the 1930s. He brought with him French archaeologist Henri Lhote, who would later return during 1956–1957, 1959, 1962, and 1970. Lhote's expeditions have been heavily criticized, with his team accused of faking images and of damaging paintings in brightening them for tracing and photography, which resulted in reducing the original colors beyond repair.

=== Current archaeological interpretation ===
The site of Tassili was primarily occupied during the Neolithic period by transhumant pastoralist groups whose lifestyle benefited both humans and livestock. The local geography, elevation, and natural resources were optimal conditions for dry-season camping of small groups. The wadis within the mountain range functioned as corridors between the rocky highlands and the sandy lowlands. The highlands have archaeological evidence of occupation dating from 5500 to 1500 BCE, while the lowlands have stone tumuli and hearths dating between 6000 and 4000 BCE. The lowland locations appear to have been used as living sites, specifically during the rainy season. There are numerous rock shelters within the sandstone forests, strewn with Neolithic artifacts including ceramic pots and potsherds, lithic arrowheads, bowls and grinders, beads, and jewelry.

The transition to pastoralism following the African Humid period during the early Holocene is reflected in Tassili n'Ajjer's archaeological material record, rock art, and zooarchaeology. Further, the occupation of Tassili is part of a larger movement and climate shift within the Central Sahara. Paleoclimatic and paleoenvironment studies started in the Central Sahara around 14,000 BP and then proceeded by an arid period that resulted in narrow ecological niches. However, the climate was not consistent and the Sahara was split between the arid lowlands and the humid highlands. Archaeological excavations confirm that human occupation, in the form of hunter-gather groups, occurred between 10,000 and 7500 BP; following 7500 BP, humans began to organize into pastoral groups in response to the increasingly unpredictable climate. There was a dry period from 7900 and 7200 BP in Tassili that preceded the appearance of the first pastoral groups, which is consistent with other parts of the Saharan-Sahelian belt. The pre-Pastoral pottery excavated from Tassili dates around 9,000–8,500 BP, while the Pastoral pottery is from 7100–6000 BP.

The rock art at Tassili is used in conjunction with other sites, including Dhar Tichitt in Mauritania, to study the development of animal husbandry and trans-Saharan travel in North Africa. Cattle were herded across vast areas as early as 3000–2000 BCE, reflecting the origins and spread of pastoralism in the area. This was followed by horses (before 1000 BCE) and then the camel in the next millennium. The arrival of camels reflects the increased development of trans-Saharan trade, as camels were primarily used as transport in trade caravans.

=== Prehistoric art ===
The rock formation is an archaeological site, noted for its numerous prehistoric parietal works of rock art, first reported in 1910, that date to the early Neolithic era at the end of the last glacial period during which the Sahara was a habitable savanna rather than the current desert. Although sources vary considerably, the earliest pieces of art are presumed to be 12,000 years old. The vast majority date to the ninth and tenth millennia BP or younger, according to OSL dating of associated sediments. The art was dated by gathering small fragments of the painted panels that had dried out and flaked off before being buried. Among the 15,000 engravings so far identified, the subjects depicted are large wild animals including antelopes and crocodiles, cattle herds, and humans who engage in activities such as hunting and dancing. These paintings are some of the earliest by Central Saharan artists, and occur in the largest concentration at Tassili. Although Algeria is relatively close to the Iberian Peninsula, the rock art of Tassili n'Ajjer evolved separately from that of the European tradition. According to UNESCO, "The exceptional density of paintings and engravings...have made Tassili world famous."

Similar to other Saharan sites with rock art, Tassili can be separated into five distinct traditions: Archaic (10,000 to 7500 BCE), Round Head (7550 to 5050 BCE), Bovidian or Pastoral (4500 to 4000 BCE), Horse (from 2000 BCE and 50 CE), and Camel (1000 BCE and onward).

The Archaic period consists primarily of wild animals that lived in the Sahara during the Early Holocene. These works are attributed to hunter-gatherer peoples, consisting of only etchings. Images are primarily of larger animals, depicted in a naturalistic manner, with the occasional geometric pattern and the human figure. Usually, the humans and animals are depicted within the context of a hunting scene.

The Round Head Period is associated with specific stylistic choices depicting humanoid forms and is well separated from the Archaic tradition even though hunter-gatherers were the artists for both. The art consists mainly of paintings, with some of the oldest and largest exposed rock paintings in Africa; one human figure stands over five meters and another at three and a half meters. The unique depiction of floating figures with round, featureless heads and formless bodies appear to be floating on the rock surface, hence the "Round Head" label. The occurrence of these paintings and motifs are concentrated in specific locations on the plateau, implying that these sites were the center of ritual, rites, and ceremonies. Most animals shown are mouflon and antelope, usually in static positions that do not appear to be part of a hunting scene.

The Bovidian/Pastoral period correlates with the arrival of domesticated cattle into the Sahara and the gradual shift to mobile pastoralism. There is a notable and visual difference between the Pastoral period and the earlier two periods, coinciding with the aridification of the Sahara. There is increased stylistic variation, implying the movement of different cultural groups within the area. Domesticated animals such as cattle, sheep, goats, and dogs are depicted, paralleling the zooarchaeological record of the area. The scenes reference diversified communities of herders, hunters with bows, as well as women and children, and imply a growing stratification of society based on property.

The following Horse traditions correspond with the complete desertification of the Sahara and the requirement for new travel methods. The arrival of horses, horse-drawn chariots, and riders are depicted, often in mid-gallop, and is associated more with hunting than warfare. Inscriptions of Libyan-Berber script, used by ancestral Berber peoples, appear next to the images, however, the text is completely indecipherable.

The last period is defined by the appearance of camels, which replaced donkeys and cattle as the main mode of transportation across the Sahara. The arrival of camels coincides with the development of long-distance trade routes used by caravans to transport salt, goods, and enslaved people across the Sahara. Men, both mounted and unmounted, with shields, spears, and swords are present. Animals including cows and goats are included, but wild animals were crudely rendered.

Although these periods are successive the timeframes are flexible and are consistently being reconstructed by archaeologists as technology and interpretation develop. The art had been dated by archaeologists who gathered fallen fragments and debris from the rock face.

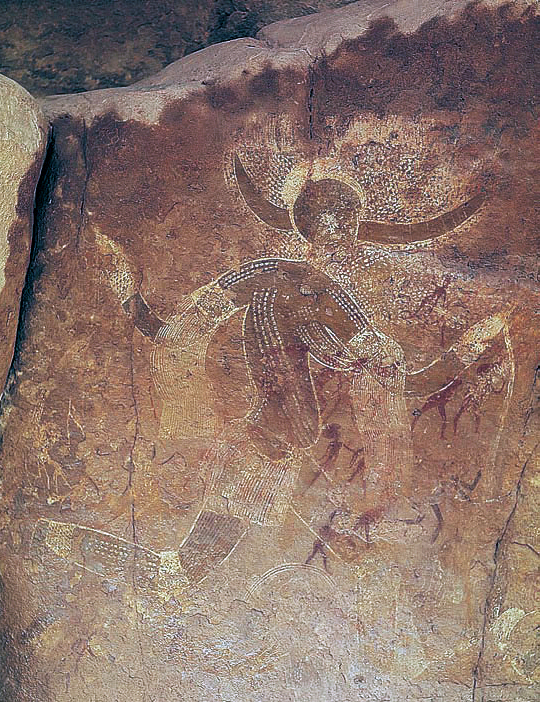
North African rock painting representing 'a horned goddess', Aouanrhet, Tassili N' Ajjer, Algeria, Round Head period.

A notable piece common in academic writing is the "Running Horned Woman", also known as the "Horned Goddess", from the round head period. The image depicts a female figure with horns in midstride; dots adorn her torso and limbs, and she is dressed in fringed armbands, a skirt, leg bands, and anklets. According to Arisika Razak, Tassili's Horned Goddess is an early example of the "African Sacred Feminine." Her femininity, fertility, and connection to nature are emphasized while the Neolithic artist superimposes the figure onto smaller, older figures. The use of bull horns is a common theme in later round head paintings, which reflects the steady integration of domesticated cattle into Saharan daily life. Cattle imagery, specifically that of bulls, became a central theme in not only at Tassili, but at other nearby sites in Libya.

=== Fungoid rock art ===
In 1989, the psychedelics researcher Giorgio Samorini proposed the theory that the fungoid-like paintings in the caves of Tassili are proof of the relationship between humans and psychedelics in the ancient populations of the Sahara, when it was still a verdant land:

One of the most important scenes is to be found in the Tin-Tazarift rock art site, at Tassili, in which we find a series of masked figures in line and hieratically dressed or dressed as dancers surrounded by long and lively festoons of geometrical designs of different kinds... Each dancer holds a mushroom-like object in the right hand and, even more surprising, two parallel lines come out of this object to reach the central part of the head of the dancer, the area of the roots of the two horns. This double line could signify an indirect association or non-material fluid passing from the object held in the right hand and the mind. This interpretation would coincide with the mushroom interpretation if we bear in mind the universal mental value induced by hallucinogenic mushrooms and vegetals, which is often of a mystical and spiritual nature (Dobkin de Rios, 1984:194). It would seem that these lines – in themselves an ideogram that represents something non-material in ancient art – represent the effect that the mushroom has on the human mind... In a shelter in Tin – Abouteka, in Tassili, there is a motif appearing at least twice that associates mushrooms and fish; a unique association of symbols among ethno-mycological cultures... Two mushrooms are depicted opposite each other, in a perpendicular position about the fish motif and near the tail. Not far from here, above, we find other fish which are similar to the aforementioned, but without the side-mushrooms.

— Giorgio Samorini, 1989

This theory was reused by Terence McKenna in his 1992 book Food of the Gods, hypothesizing that the Neolithic culture that inhabited the site used psilocybin mushrooms as part of its religious ritual life, citing rock paintings showing persons holding mushroom-like objects in their hands, as well as mushrooms growing from their bodies. For Henri Lhote, who discovered the Tassili caves in the late 1950s, these were obviously secret sanctuaries.

The painting that best supports the mushroom hypothesis is the Tassili mushroom figure Matalem-Amazar where the body of the represented shaman is covered with mushrooms. According to Earl Lee in his book From the Bodies of the Gods: Psychoactive Plants and the Cults of the Dead (2012), this imagery refers to an ancient episode where a "mushroom shaman" was buried while fully clothed and when unearthed sometime later, tiny mushrooms would be growing on the clothes. Earl Lee considered the mushroom paintings at Tassili fairly realistic.

According to Brian Akers, writer for the Mushroom journal, the fungoid rock art in Tassili does not resemble the representations of the Psilocybe hispanica in the Selva Pascuala caves (2015), and he doesn't consider it realistic.

== In popular culture ==
- Tassili is the recording location and the title of a 2011 album by the Tuareg band Tinariwen.
- Tassili Plain is a track on the 1994 album Natural Wonders of the World in Dub by dub group Zion Train.
- In Fate/Extella: The Umbral Star, the character Altera is actually a shattered form of the deity known as Sefar, which is based on one of the drawings made in the cave group and is known in the story also as The White Titan of Tassili n'Ajjer

== Gallery ==
Rock-Art, Saharan Cypress and Landscapes of the Tassili

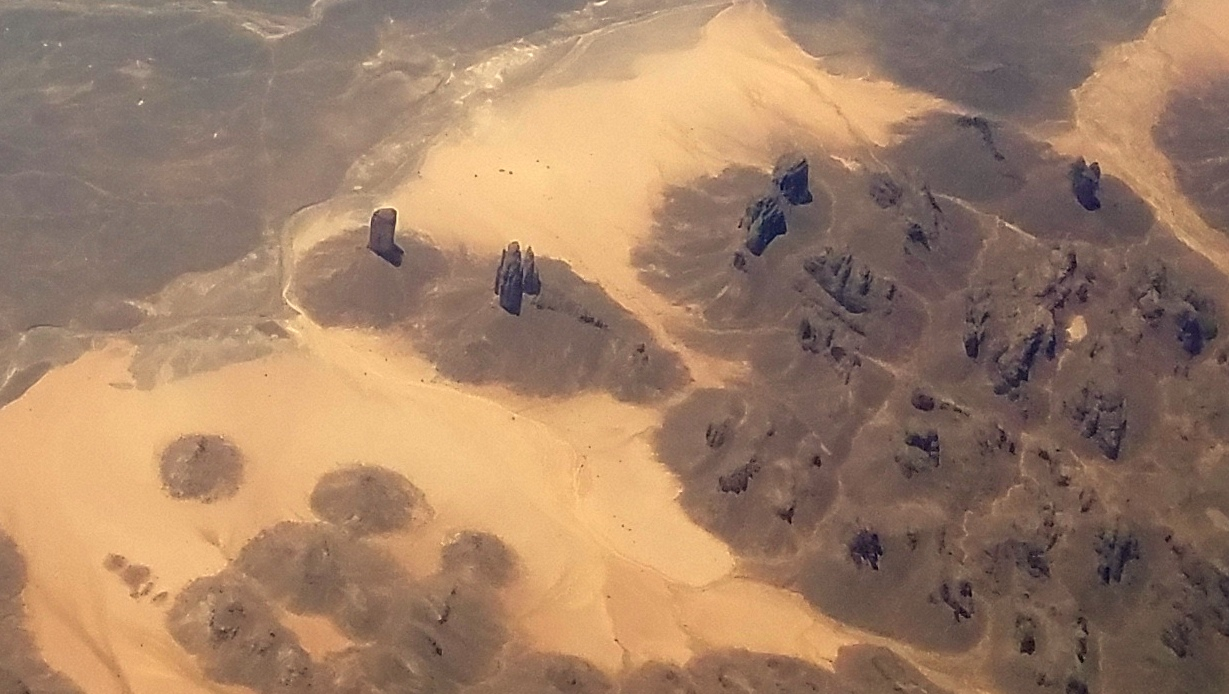
Very high rock columns
photograph taken from 30 000 ft

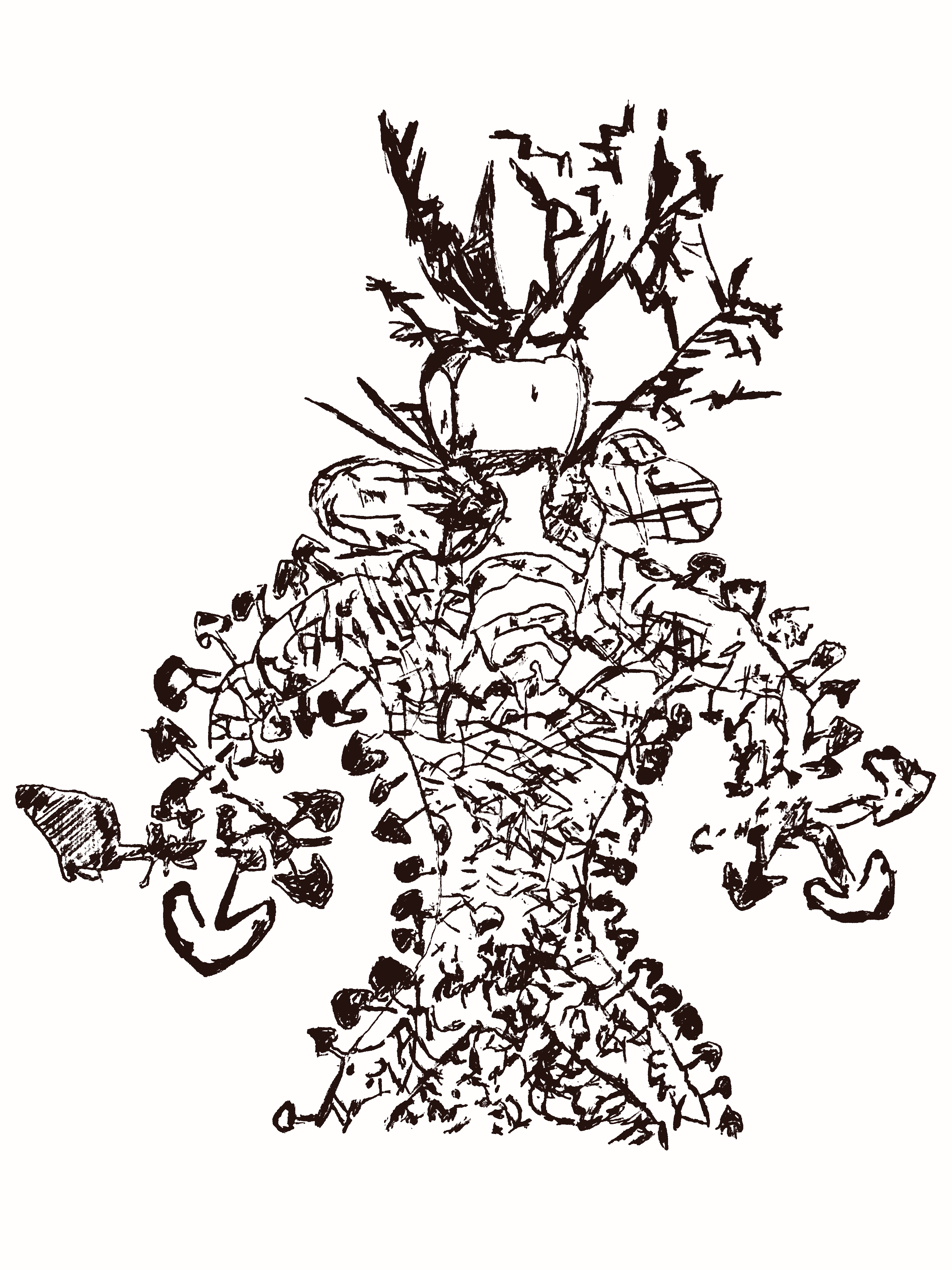
Anonymous reproduction of the Tassili Mushroom Figure Matalem-Amazar found in Tassili.

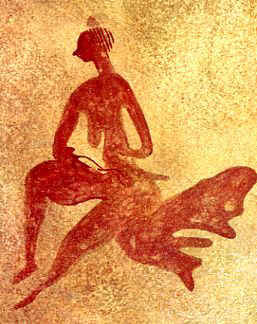
Depiction of a dancing or seated human

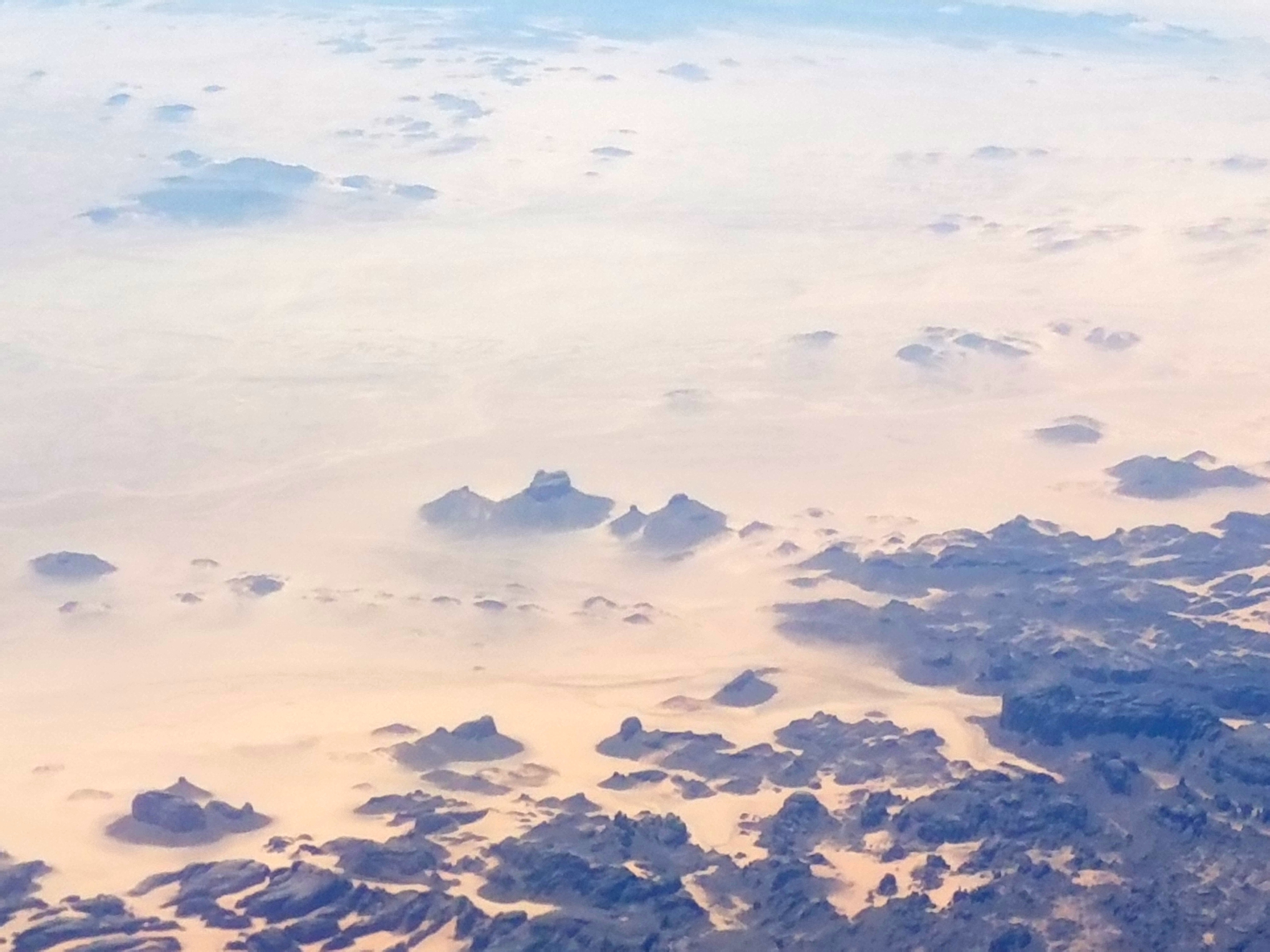
Dunes at Tassili n'Ajjer

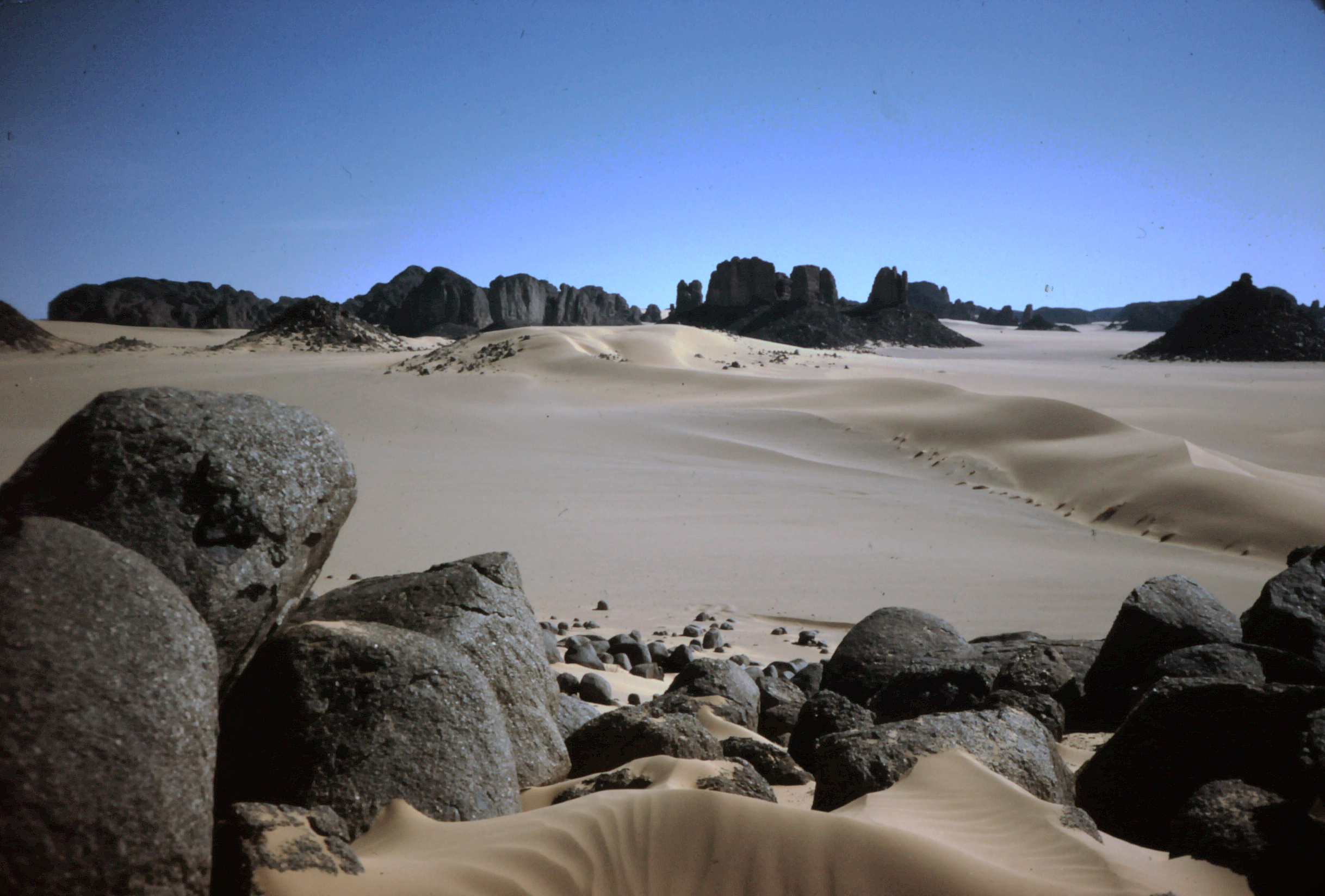
Sand and rock landscape on the southern edge of the Tassili n'Ajjer

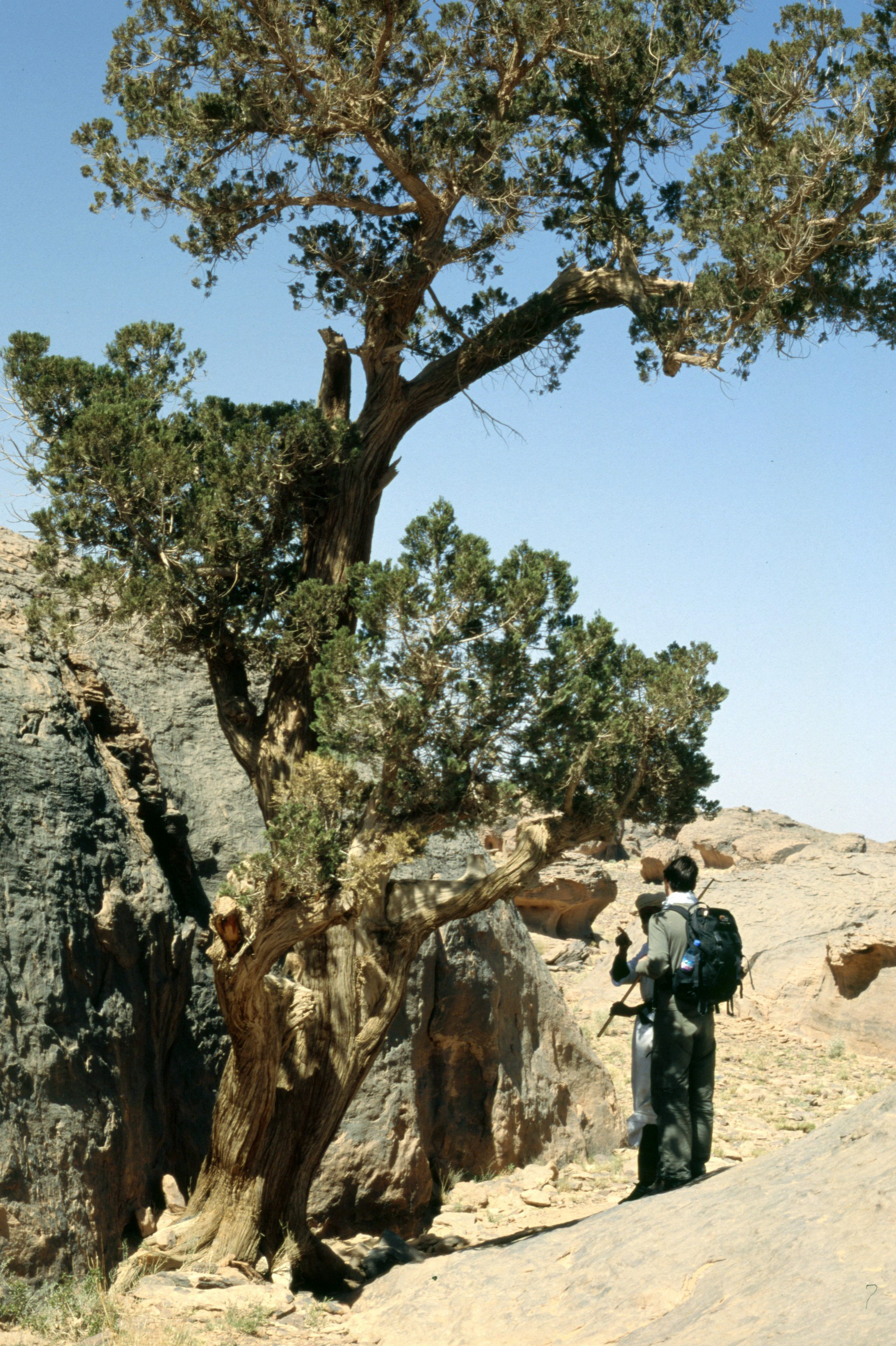
Local cypresses

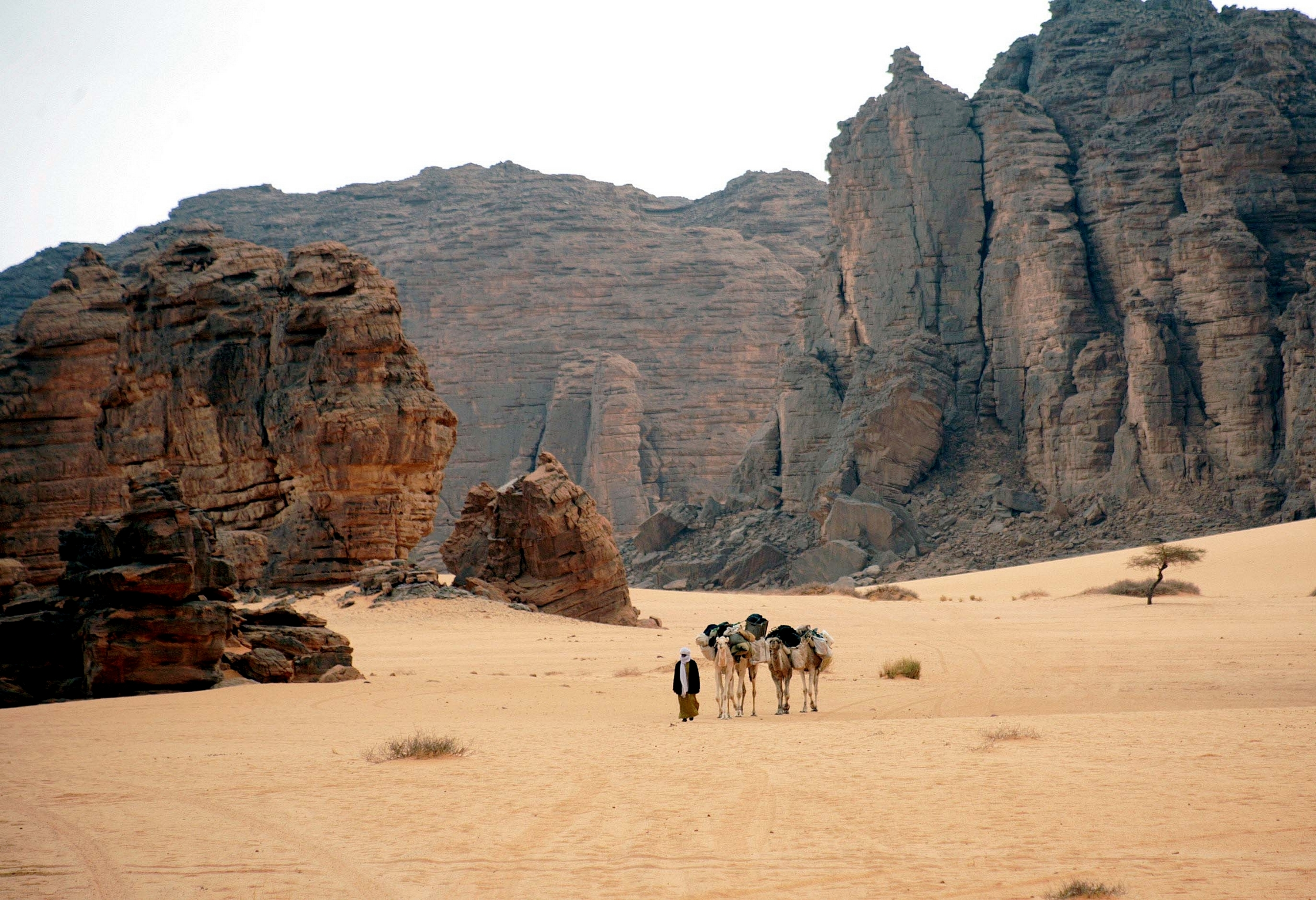
Sandstone rocks and cliffs

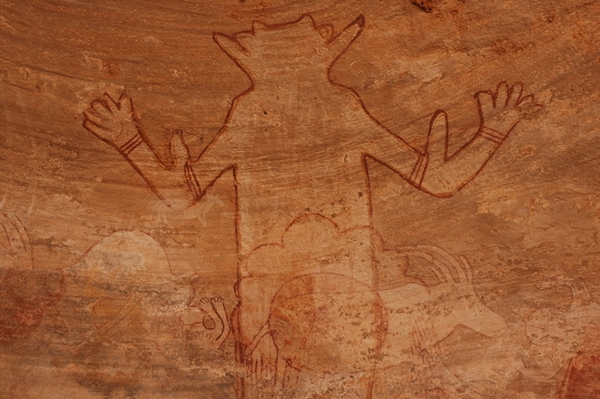
Ritual figure or shaman

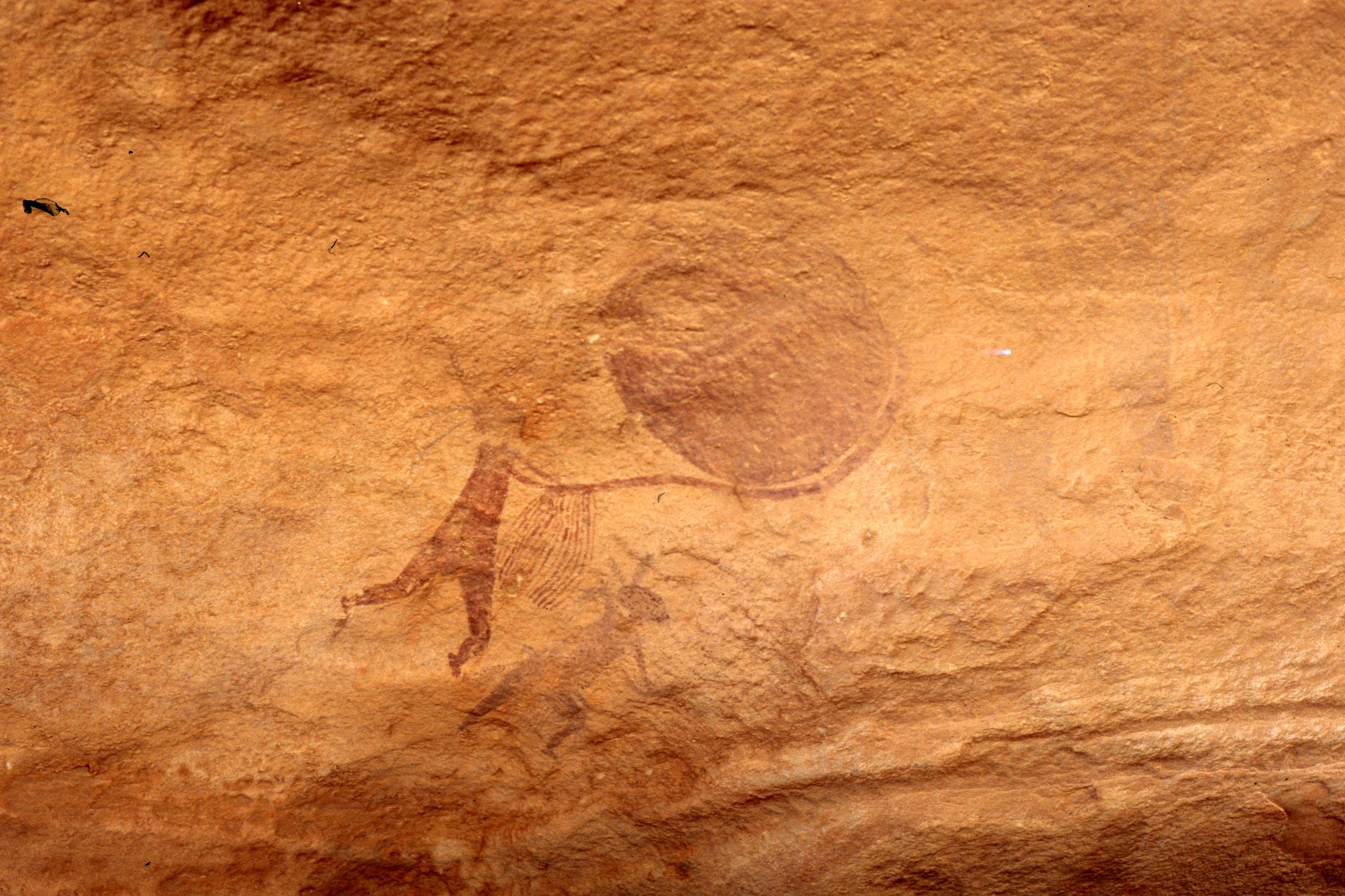
Human figures

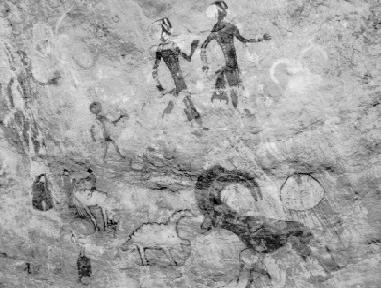
Human figures

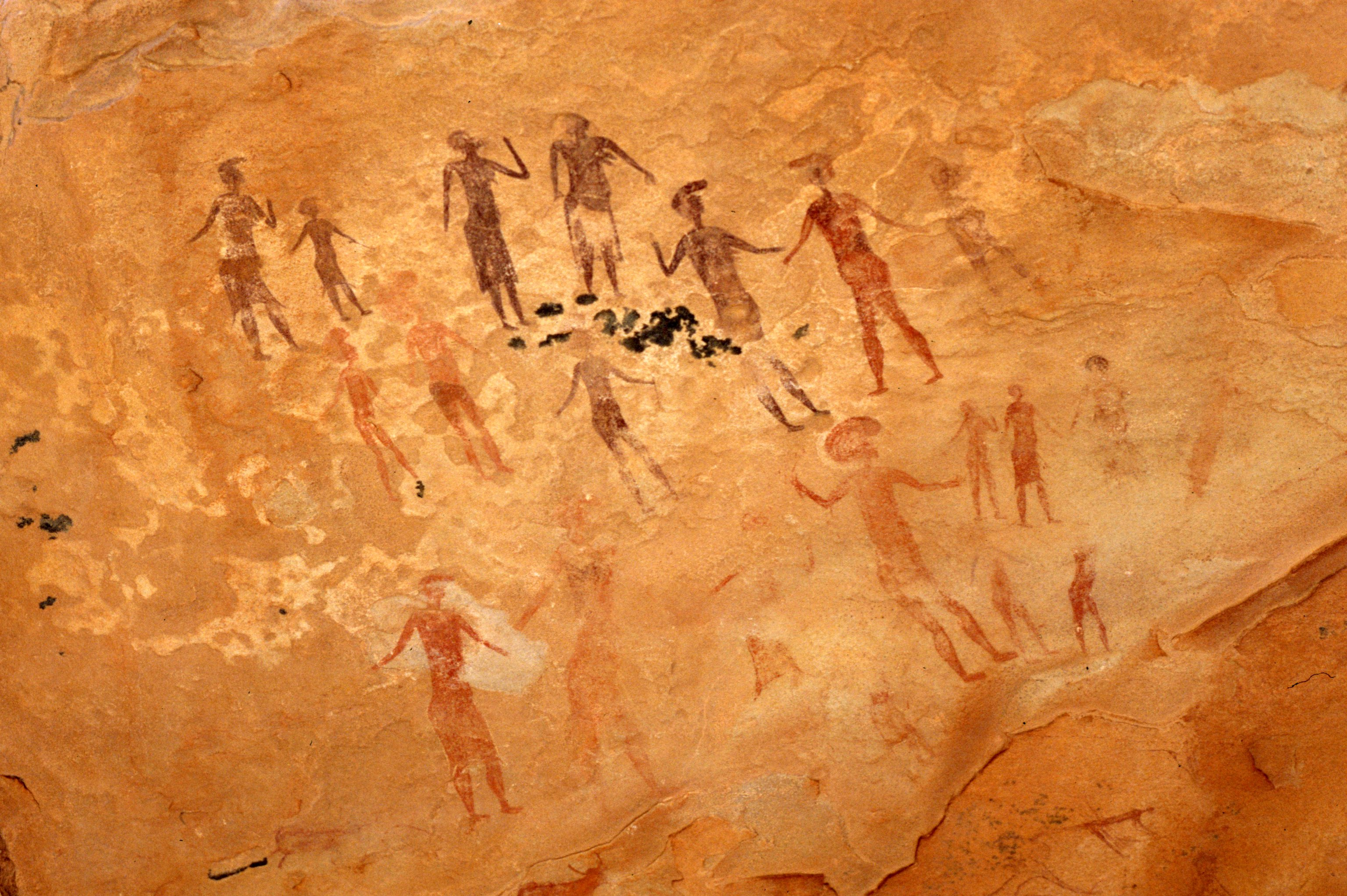
Human figures

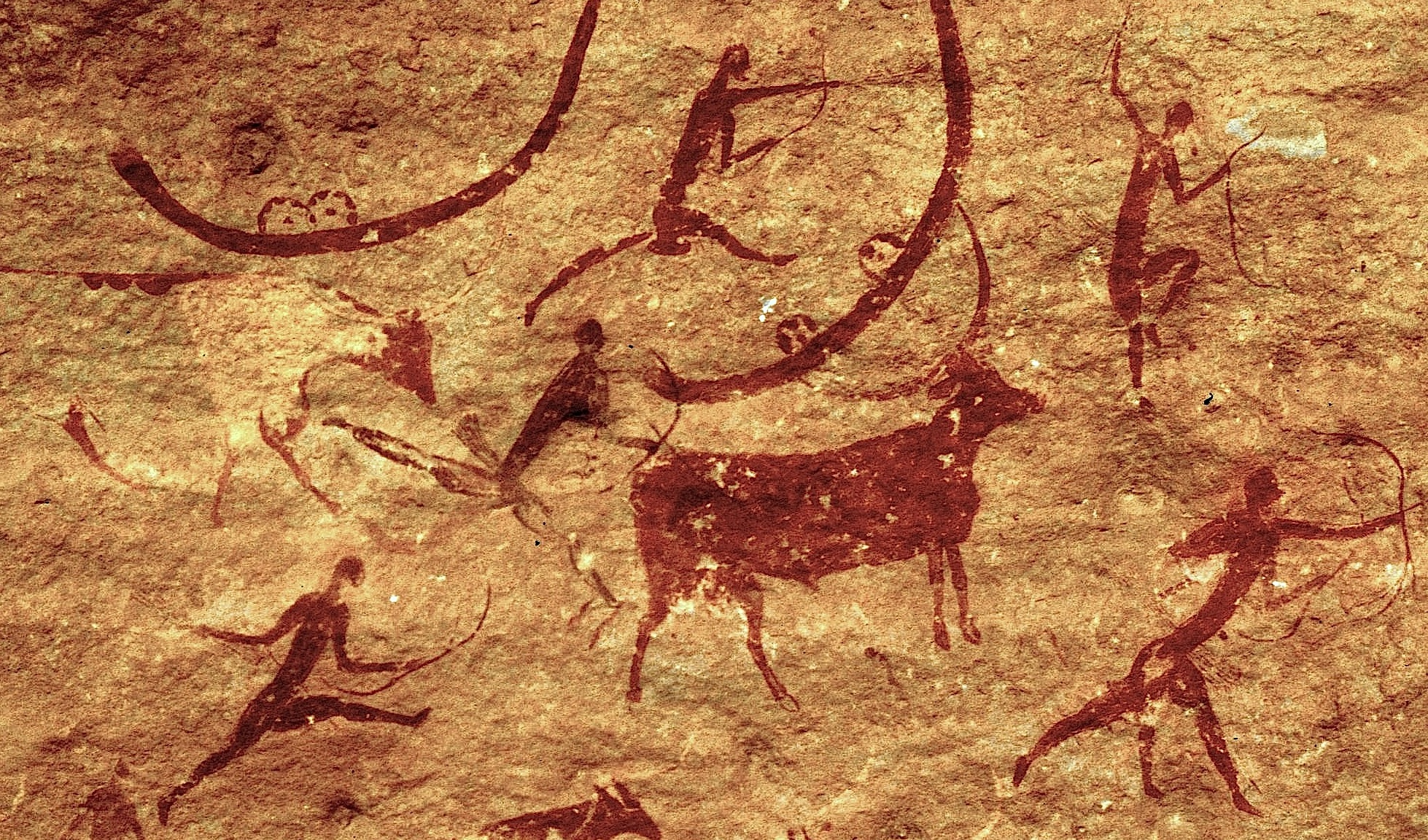
Human figures with bows

=== The rock engravings of Tin-Taghirt ===
The Tin-Taghirt site is located in the Tassili n'Ajjer between the cities of Dider and Iherir.

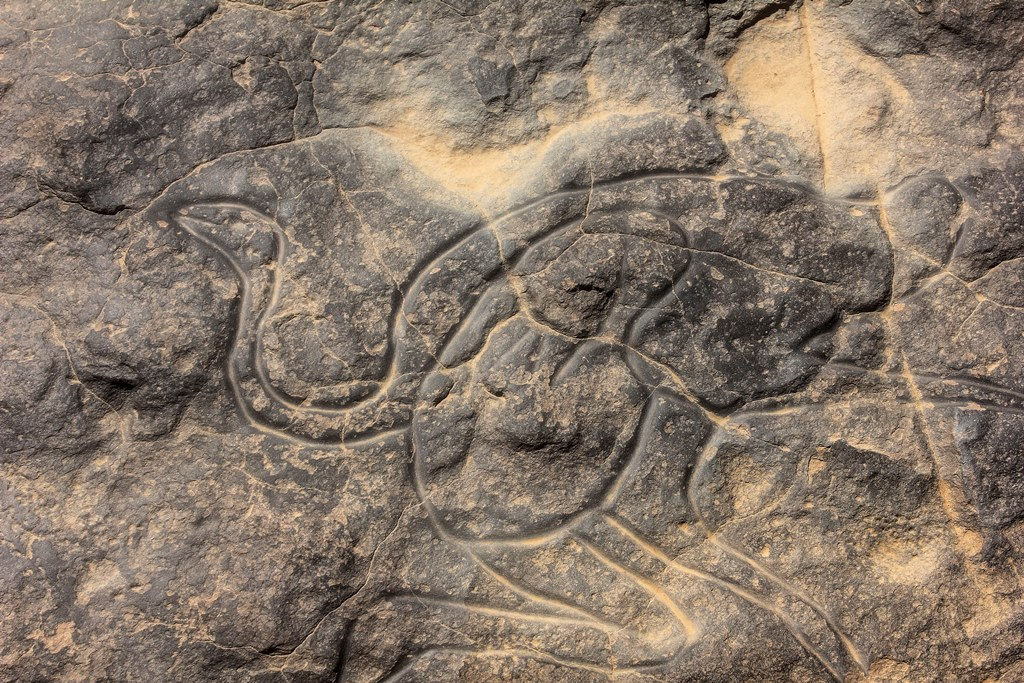
An ostrich

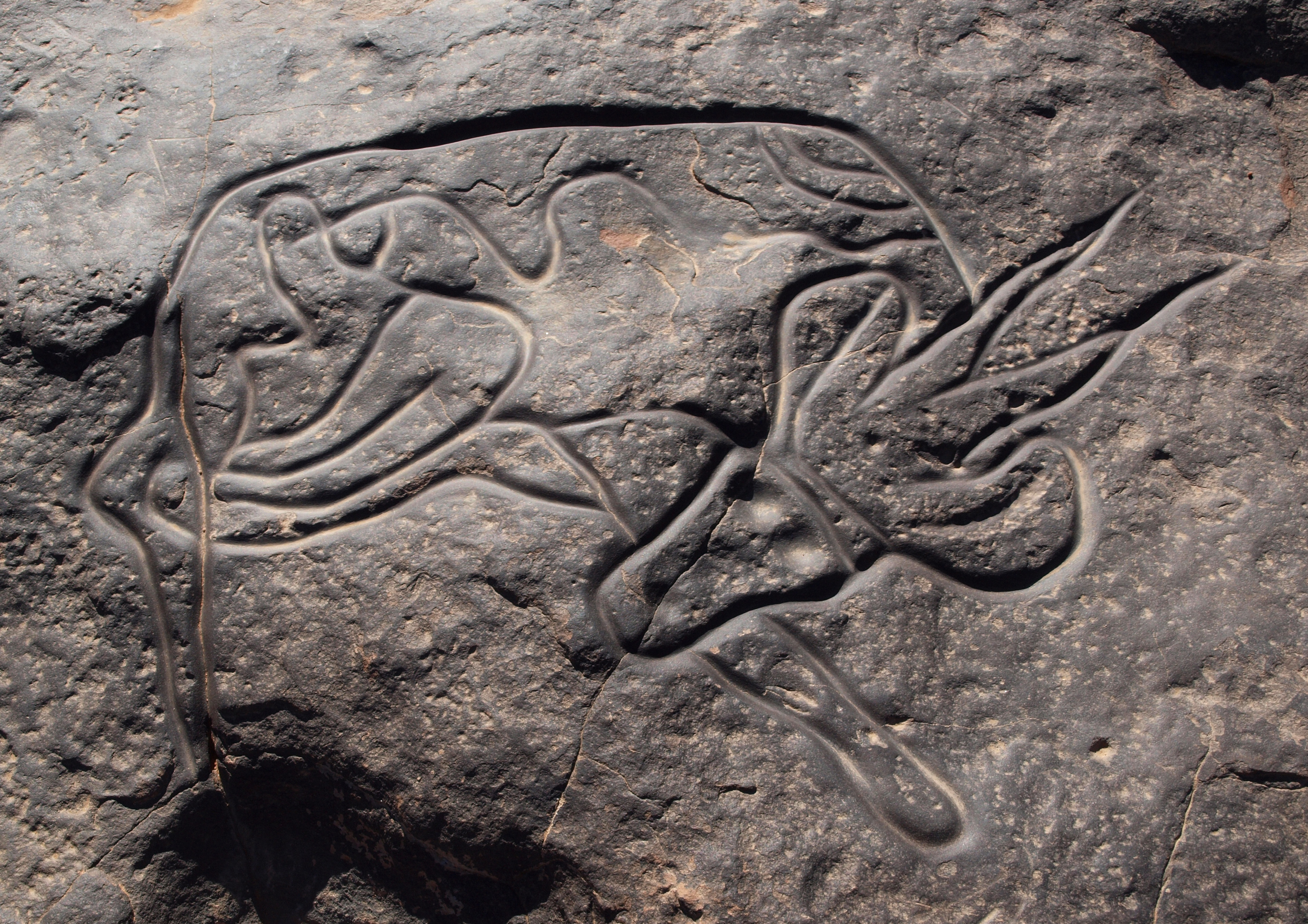
Sleeping antelope - also found on the reverse of the 1000 Algerian dinar banknote

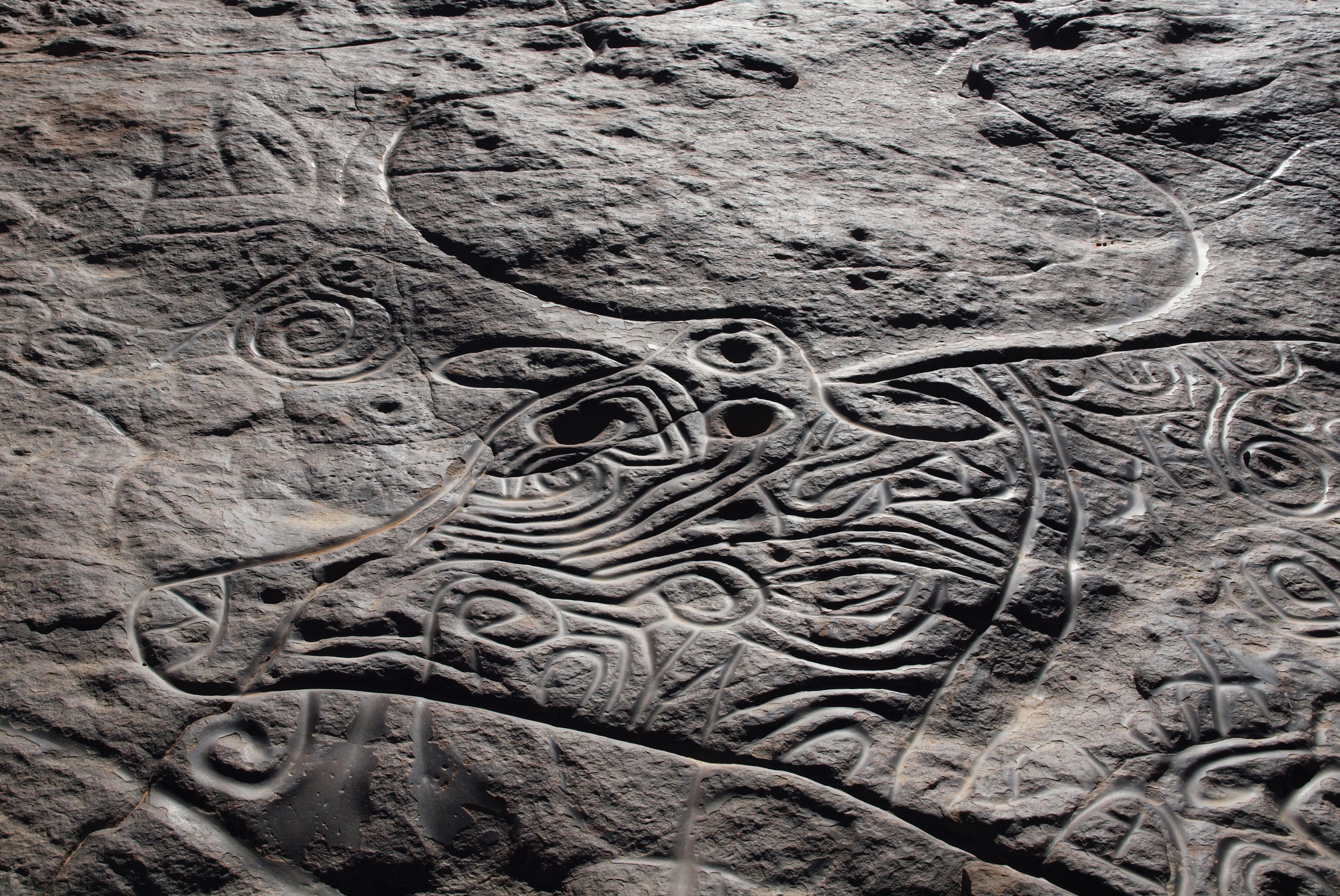
Bubalus antiquus

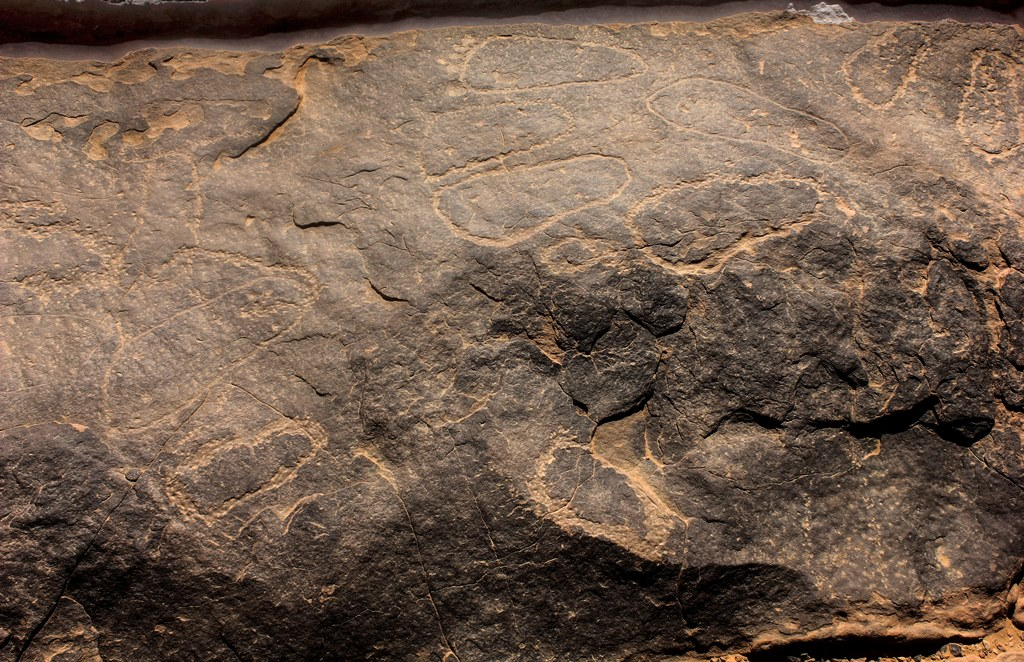
Footprints

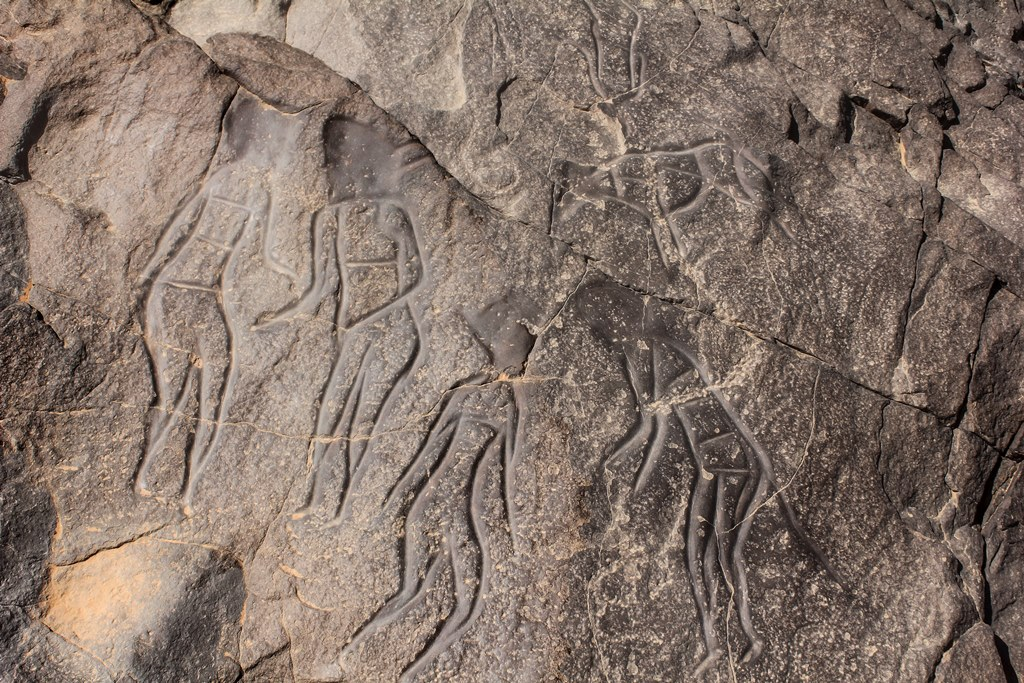
Human beings

== See also ==
- List of Stone Age art
- List of cultural assets of Algeria
- Sebiba
