= Giorgio Samorini =

Italian ethnobotanist (born 1957)

- Born: 1957 (age 68–69); Bologna, Italy
- Known for: Work with psychedelic drugs

Giorgio Samorini (born 1957 in Bologna, Italy) is a psychedelic drug researcher. He has published many essays and monographs regarding the use of psychoactive compounds and sacred plants. He was a frequent contributor to, and sometimes editor of Eleusis the Journal of Psychoactive Plants & Compounds.

== Bibliography ==
=== Books ===
- Animals and Psychedelics: The Natural World and the Instinct to Alter Consciousness (2000). Giorgio Samorini. Park Street Press. ISBN 978-0-89281-986-7
- Samorini G., 1995, Gli Allucinogeni Nel Mito. Racconti sull'origine delle piante psicoattive. Nautilus Press, Torino.
- Samorini G., 1996, L'erba di Carlo Erba. Per una storia della canapa indiana in Italia (1845–1948), Nautilus, Torino.
- Samorini G., 2001, Funghi allucinogeni. Studi etnomicologici, Telesterion, Dozza BO. ISBN 978-88-87999-01-3.
- Samorini G., 2002, Animals and Drugs. The Natural World and the Instinct to Alter Consciousness, Rochester, Vermont. ISBN 978-0892819867.
- Samorini G., 2012, Droghe tribali, Shake Edizioni, Milano. ISBN 978-88-97109-26-6
- Samorini G., 2016, Jurema, la pianta della visione. Dai culti del Brasile alla Psiconautica di frontiera, Shake Edizioni, Milano. ISBN 978-88-97109-43-3
- D'Arienzo A. & Samorini G., 2019, Terapie psichedeliche. Dal paradigma psicotomimetico all´approccio neurofenomenologico, vol. 1&2, Milano, Shake, ISBN 978-88-97109-79-2

=== Publications ===
- Selected archives of: Eleusis: the Journal of Psychoactive Plants & Compounds.
- Samorini G. & F. Festi, 1989, "Le micotossicosi psicotrope volontarie in Europa: osservazioni sui casi clinici", in Atti I Convegno Nazionale sugli Avvelenamenti da Funghi, Rovereto 22-23 Ottobre 1988, Annali Museo Civico Rovereto, Suppl. vol. 4: 251-257.
- Samorini G., 1993, "Funghi allucinogeni italiani", in Atti II Convegno Nazionale Avvelenamenti da Funghi, Rovereto 3-4 aprile 1992, Annali Museo Civico Rovereto, Suppl. vol. 8: 125-149.
- Gartz Jochen, Giorgio Samorini & Francisco Festivities, 1996, “On the presumed French case of fatality for ingestion of funghetti”, Eleusis, n. 6, pp. 3–13.
- Samorini G., 1995, "Kuda-kallu: umbrella-stones or mushroom-stones? (Kerala, Southern India)", Integration, 6: 33-40.
- Samorini G. & G. Camilla, 1995, "Rappresentazioni fungine nell'arte greca", Annali Museo Civico Rovereto, 10: 307-326.
- Giorgio Samorini, “The ‘Mushroom-Tree’ of Plaincourault”, Eleusis: Journal of Psychoactive Plants and Compounds, n. 8, 1997, pp. 29–37.
- Giorgio Samorini, “The ‘Mushroom-Trees’ in Christian Art”, Eleusis: Journal of Psychoactive Plants and Compounds, n. 1, 1998, pp. 87–108.
- Samorini G., 1998, "The Pharsalus Bas-Relief and the Eleusinian Mysteries", The Entheogen Review, 7(2): 60-63.
- Samorini Giorgio, 2001, “Fungi hallucinogens. Etnomicologici studies”, Telesterion, Dozza BO, pag. 248
- Samorini G., 2001, "New Data from the Ethnomycology of Psychoactive Mushrooms", International Journal of Medicinal Mushrooms, vol. 3, pp. 257–278.
- Samorini G., 1992, "The oldest representations of hallucinogenic mushrooms in the world (Sahara Desert, 9000-7000 BP)", Integration, 2/3: 69-78.
- Samorini G., 1996, "Colliri visionari", Eleusis, 5: 27-32.
- Samorini G., 1997–98, "The Initiation Rite in the Bwiti Religion (Ndea Narizanga Sect, Gabon)", Jahrbuch für Ethnomedizine, vol. 6-7, pp. 39–55.
- Samorini G., 2002, "A contribution to the ethnomycology and ethnobotany of Alpine psychoactive vegetals", Acta Phytotherapeutica, 3° s., 2: 59-65.
- Samorini G., 2002–2003, The ancestor cult Byeri and the psychoactive plant alan (Alchornea floribunda) among the Fang of Western Equatorial Africa", Eleusis, n.s., vol. 6/7, pp. 29–55.
- Samorini G., 2003–04, "Il dio egiziano Min e la lattuga. Un contributo etnobotanico a un enigma dell'egittologia", Archeologia Africana, Centro Studi Archeologia Africana, Museo Civico di Milano, vol. 9-10, pp. 73–84.
- Samorini G., 2006, "Lattuga e lattucario. Storia di equivoci ed enigmi insoluti", Erboristeria Domani, n. 299, gennaio, pp. 49–55.
