= Rock art in the Iheren-Tahilahi style =

Rock painting shelters in Algeria

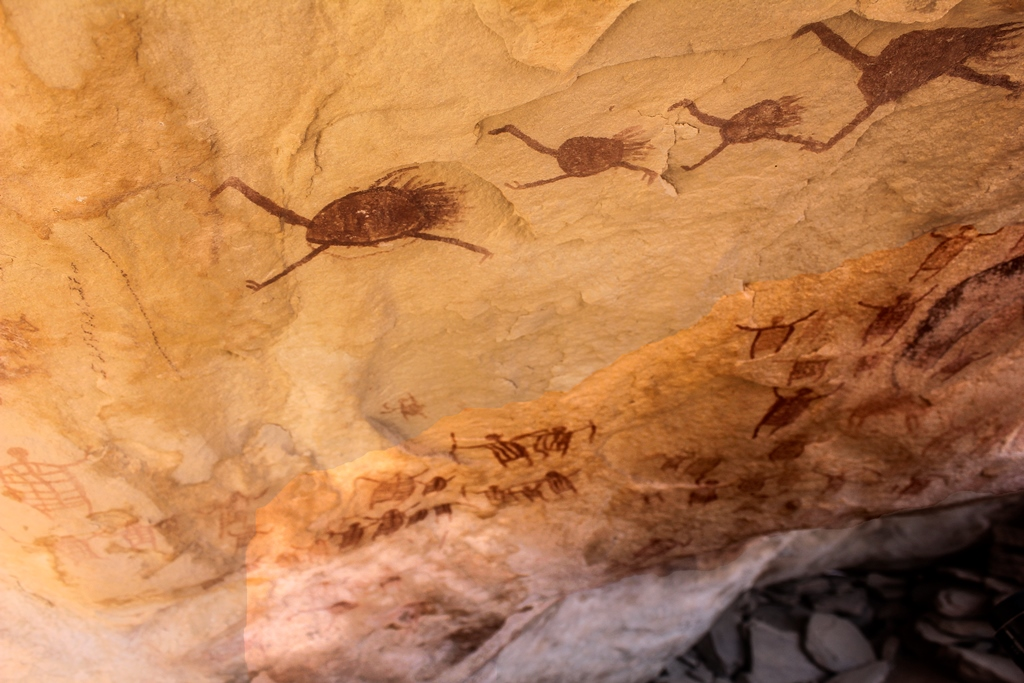
Iheren: A family of ostriches on the run. Below them are human figures, probably from a different era

Iheren (or Eheren) and Tahilahi are rock painting shelters, located near Iherir in the Tassili n'Ajjer mountains in southeastern Algeria. They gave their name to the Iheren-Tahilahi style of painting of Saharan rock art. They are characterized by their naturalistic depictions, featuring many motifs and details from everyday life. They paint an informative picture of the world of nomadic herders and hunters in the Sahara during the 3rd millennium BCE.

== Distribution ==
The two painted rock shelters, Iheren and Tahilahi, are located about 50 km north of Bordj El Haouas in the central part of the Tassili n'Ajjer, about 20 km west of the Iherir oasis. Other sites featuring this type of rock art can be found in the same region: Tassakarot, Abanora, Oued Tikadiouine, and Ikadnouchère. Another major concentration is located in the southeastern part of the Tassili n’Ajjer, in the region northeast of Djanet, and in the northwestern part, east of Amguid. Additional rock overhangs featuring paintings in this style have been found in the neighboring Acacus Mountains, in the Tadrart Acacus, Tadrart Rouge and in the Immidir Mountains. Single depictions have also been found in the Djado Plateau and Hoggar Mountains.

== Dating ==
Since there are sites where drawings of different styles overlap, the relative chronology of the styles can be well documented. Absolute dating, on the other hand, is rare, since, for example, charcoal was rarely used for drawing, and finds of organic matter in the soil at the base of the rock overhangs do not necessarily date from the same period. However, there is one C-14 dating result from the Iheren site. It yielded an age of 4,850 ± 110 years, which corresponds to approximately 3,000 BCE. Researchers assume that the images were created about 4,000 to 5,000 years ago, during the Neolithic period.

== Painting techniques ==
The images are small in size, usually no larger than 50 cm. A characteristic feature is the effort to depict subjects as realistically as possible and with great detail. Their depictions often demonstrate aesthetic quality. The combination of line drawings and flat areas of color is a particularly distinctive feature of this style. It allows the many details to be highlighted. The line drawings are rendered in ochre, drawn with a mineral stick used like a pencil or with a very narrow brush. Spots and areas are also often rendered in lighter ochre, with light areas—for example, on cows—depicted in white. There are depictions of livestock in which a large herd of animals can be recognized within a confined space; the animals at the edges are drawn in full, while the inner part of the group is filled only with the animals’ heads.

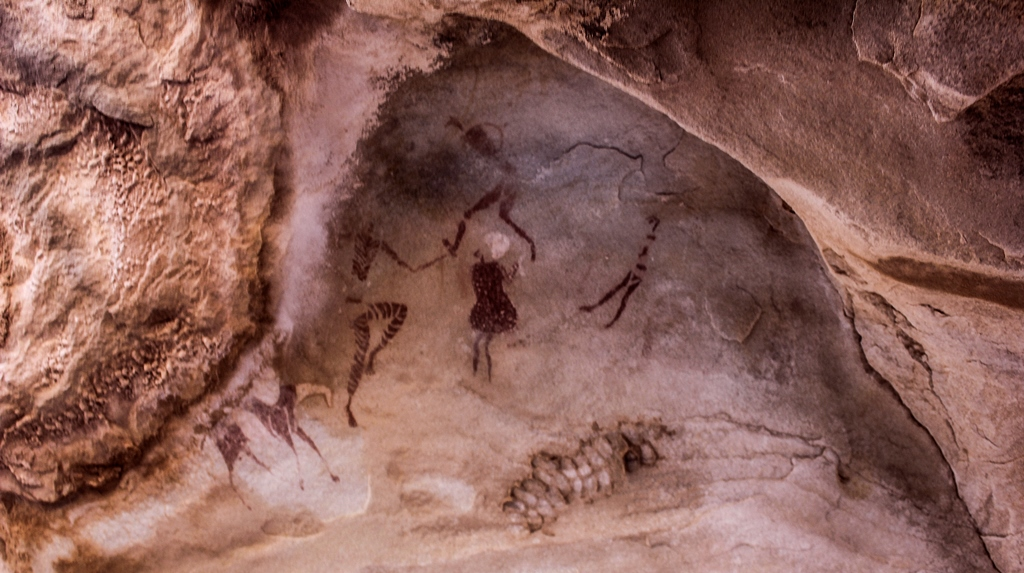
Iheren: Dance scene, men with body paint, woman in a skirt

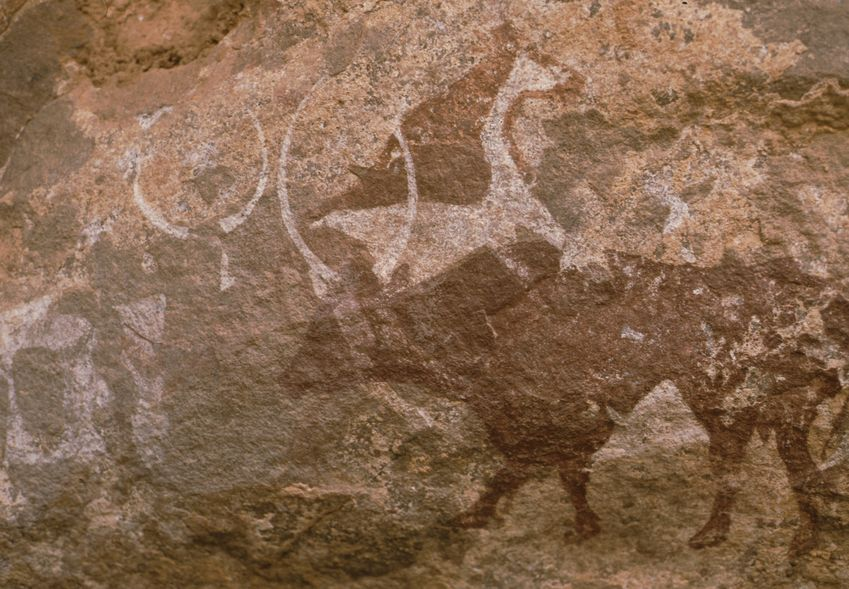
Tassili n'Ajjer (?): cattle herd
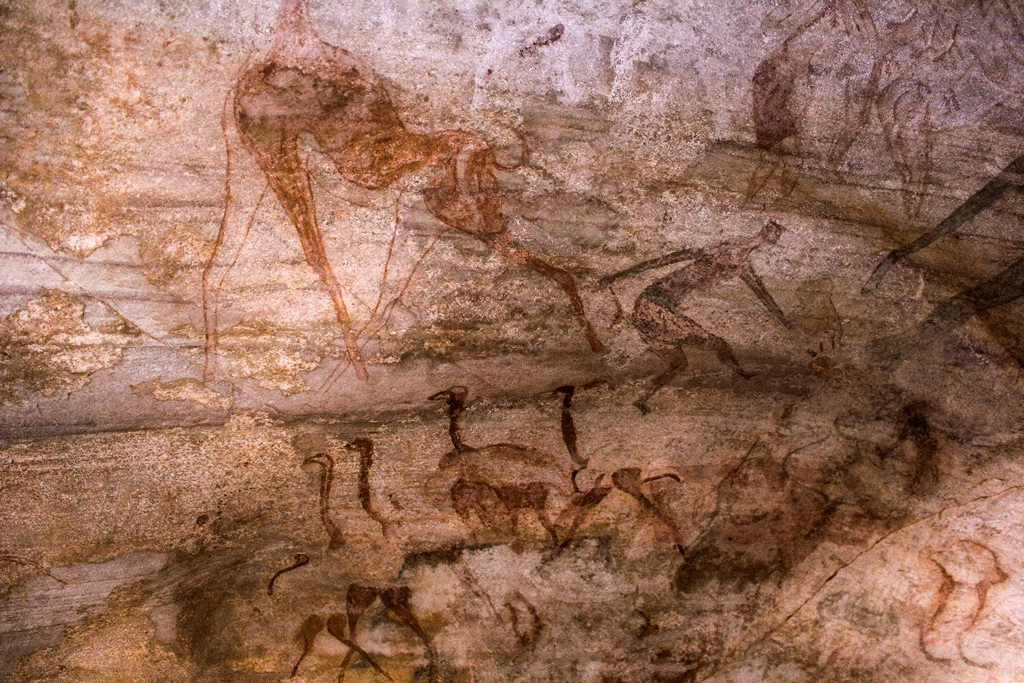
Iheren: Hoofed animal, man in motion, ostriches below

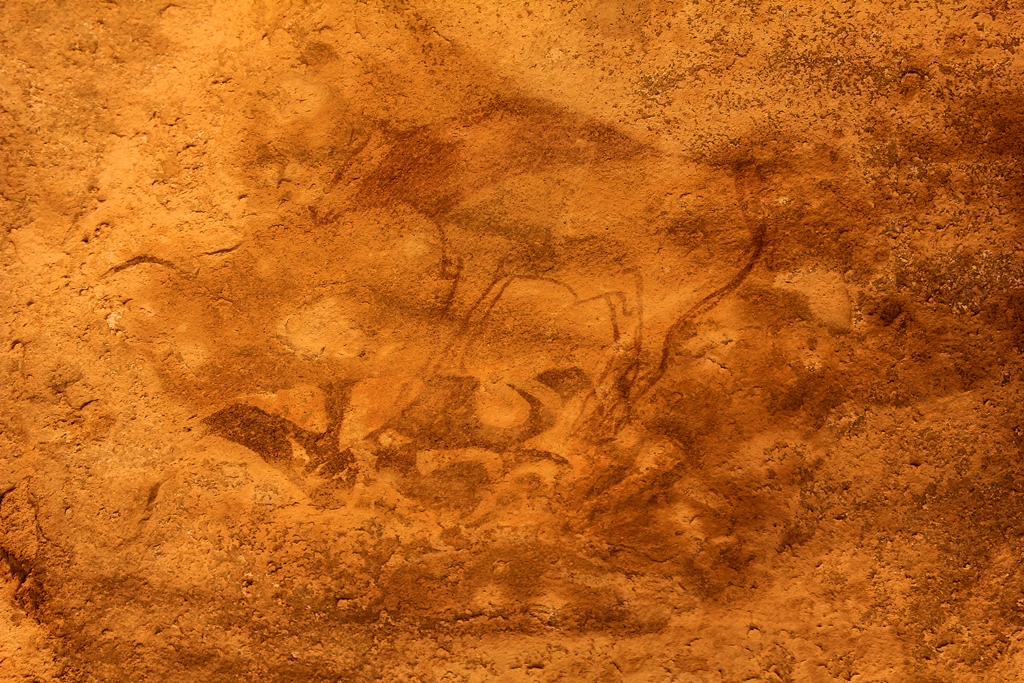
Iheren: Ox

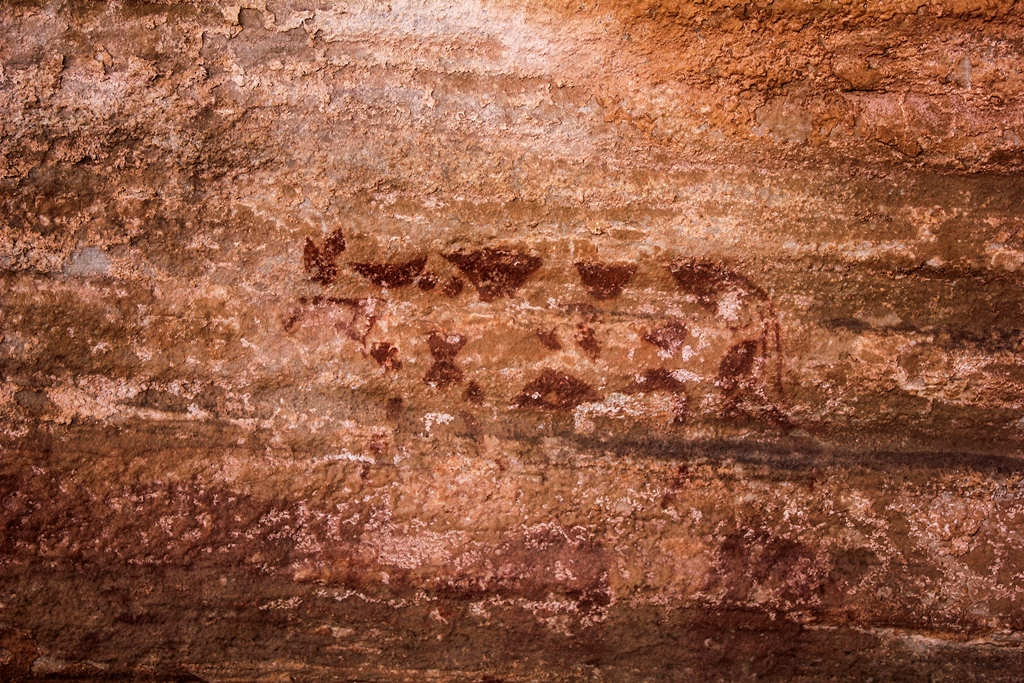
Iheren: A spotted, cow-like animal
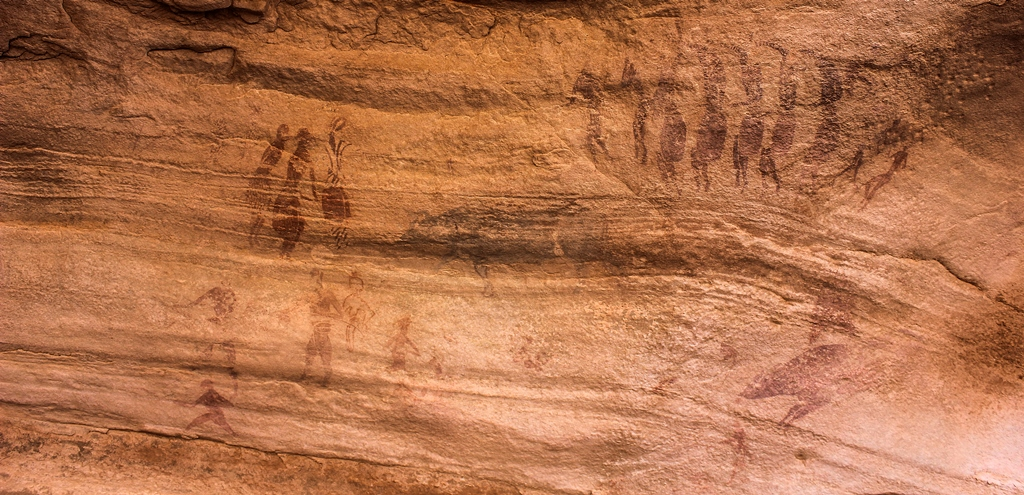
Iheren: human figures, groups of women

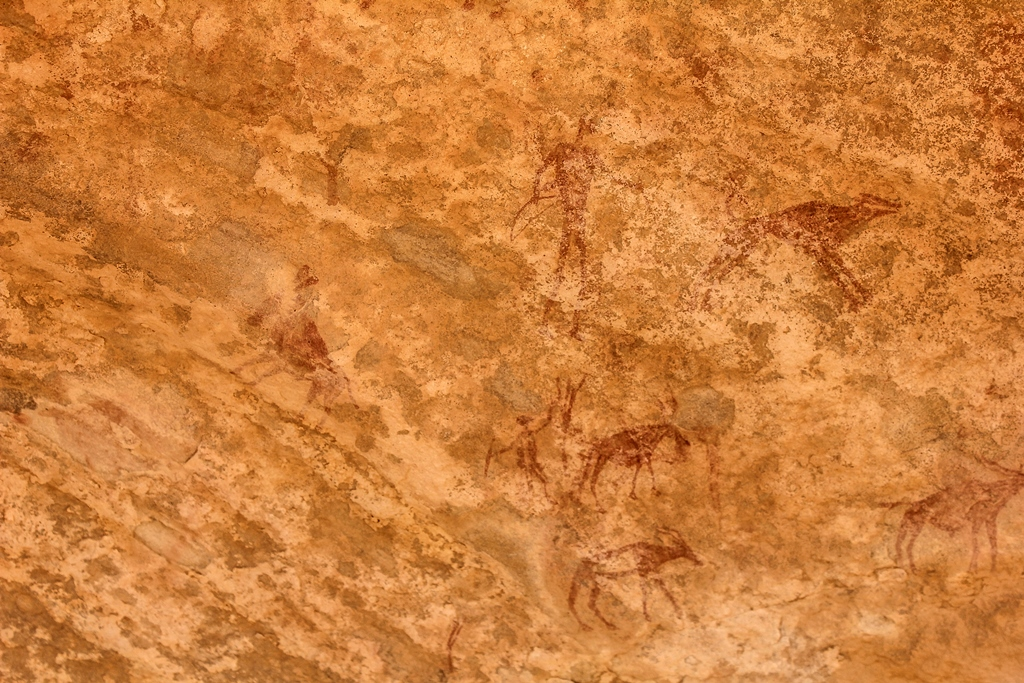
Iheren: Men with bows, antelopes (?)

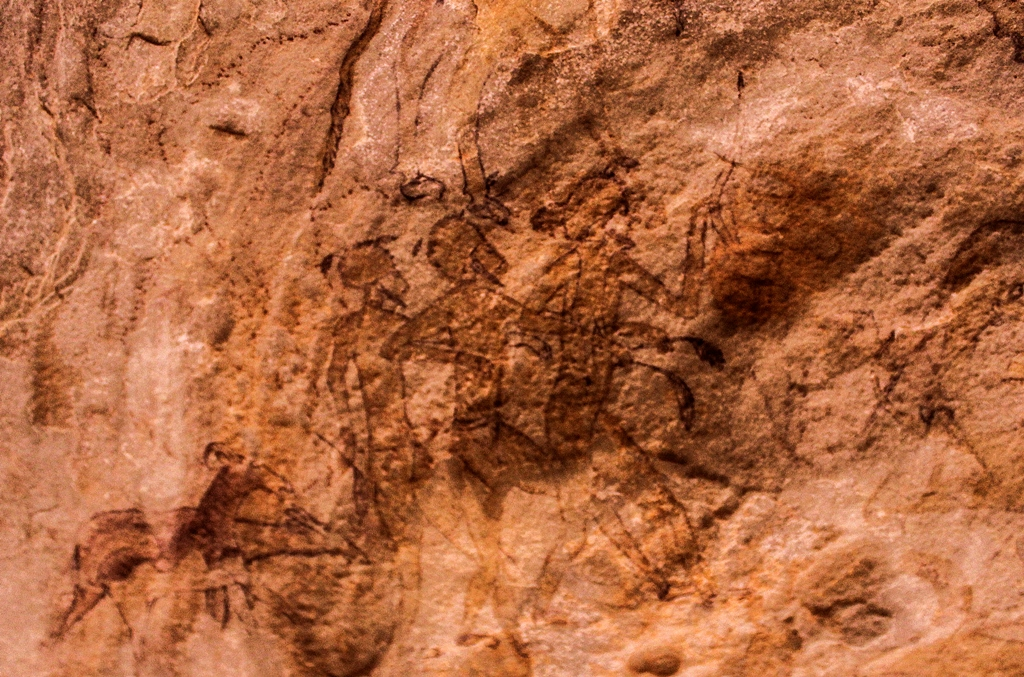
Iheren: three men, followed by two domestic animals

== Subject matter ==
=== Animal depictions ===
Among wild animals, various antelope species are depicted and can be easily distinguished, such as bushbucks, dama gazelles, or oryx antelopes. Giraffes and ostriches appear frequently, reflecting the increasingly arid climate; other large game animals appear only in isolated depictions: elephants, as well as a few lions in hunting scenes.

Sheep are the most common domestic animals depicted. They belong to the breed of the Ancient Egyptian corkscrew-horned sheep (Ovis longipes palaeoaegyptiacus), in which both females and males have horns. This breed of wool-less sheep is still raised in the central and southern Sahara. In the large encampment scene at Iheren, the returning herd is led by goats. They can be recognized by their beards and longer, slightly curved horns. The third domesticated animal is the ox (Bos africanus) with long, rather slender horns, often shaped like a lyre. It is also depicted as a pack and riding animal. No saddle is used for riding; instead, a rounded, sometimes decorated sack containing the necessary padding is often placed on top of the animal. Dogs are very rare in this pastoral culture. Only four depictions are known.

=== Depictions of humans and cultural elements ===
Most, but not all, depictions show people of Mediterranean appearance, with delicate facial features and slender, non-muscular bodies with light skin. It is believed that these were Paleo-Berbers who migrated from the northeast into the Central Sahara and quickly became the dominant ethnic group. The men often wear a short, triangular beard, similar to that still found today among the Berbers of North Africa. Body painting is characteristic of this style and is found primarily on the arms and legs; in men, it also appears on the face. It usually consists of a black stripe drawn vertically across the forehead and the bridge of the nose. Instead of body paint, however, it could also be a tattoo. Women are often depicted with voluminous hairstyles adorned with white veils. Their dresses consist of woven panels of fabric, sometimes decorated with leather appliqués. These are long skirts that reach to the middle of the calf. A type of loincloth made of goatskin, which sometimes appears and is worn in various ways, is painted not with lines but as a solid, dark area. Men also wear such a loincloth, which is cut more tightly and can also cover the chest, serving as a kind of vest. Children and adolescents are usually naked.

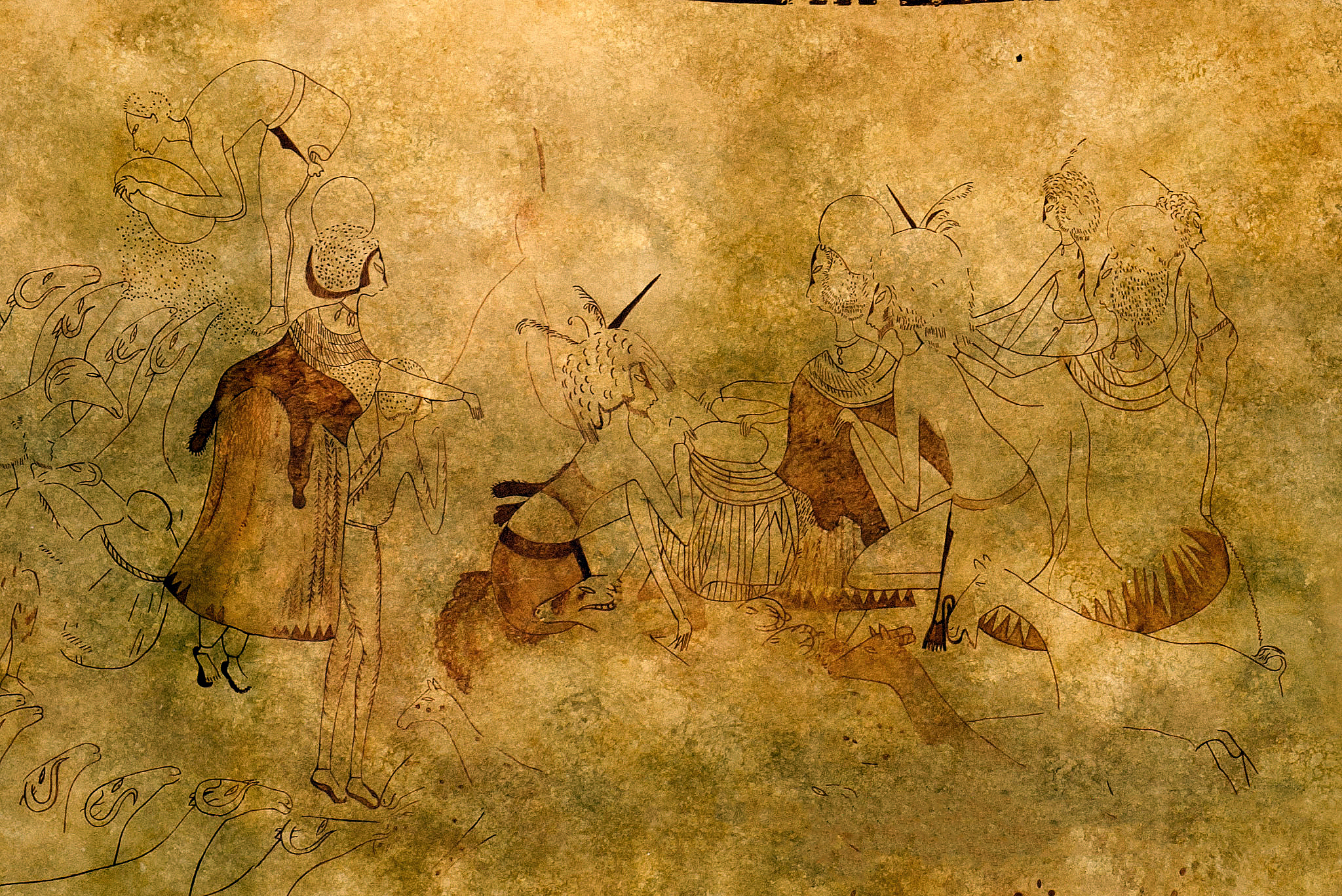
Women have gathered around a decorated ceramic pot (or calabash) surrounded by sheep and goats. Copy of a rock painting in the Iheren-Tahilahy style

Many scenes from their daily life are depicted, such as setting up tents, breaking camp, traveling, activities at the camp, herding livestock, slaughtering, hunting, dancing, celebrating, caring for children, people conversing, and resting. In a painting measuring 85 by 110 cm from the Irekam Aharhar site, northeast of Bordj El Houas, a herd of cattle, calves, and goats is grouped around a family scene. In the center of the group sits a man holding a small child whom he has just lifted out of a basket. It may be his firstborn child, whom he is now introducing to his neighbors or relatives on the left. In the foreground on the right, a woman is crouching—probably the mother of the child. She holds out a hand to catch the child should it slip from the father’s grasp. She wears her hair neatly styled and a loose-fitting robe with a ruffled border. Like her neighbor, she wears sandals; even the laces have not been forgotten.

In the camps of these nomads stand tents made of sewn-together strips of leather, supported by a framework of bent poles. The depictions also suggest that liquids with herbal additives were fermented in calabashes. Straws were used for drinking. A common dance scene depicts men or women following one another, with one hand raised and resting on the shoulder of the person in front of them. The Tuareg have adopted this dance style.

Hunting scenes are common. Often, the hunters have an animal with them—a fellow species to lure the game, or, in the case of predators, another animal as bait. Another ruse was for the hunters to clothe themselves in animal skins. There are also depictions of warriors. In a roughly 40-cm-tall depiction from the Iheren II site, four male figures are shown in dynamic motion, armed with stabbing weapons (or pointed throwing sticks). They appear to be fighting each other, though it could also be a war dance. In the Immidir Mountains, there is a depiction of 14 archers standing opposite one another in two groups, ready to shoot. The scene may depict a conflict between two clans. However, the fact that some archers are seated could indicate that this is a ritual confrontation.

== Connection to burial monuments ==
Researchers believe with a certain degree of probability that the rock art in the Iheren-Tahilahi style was created by the same ethnic group that built the keyhole monuments.

== Bibliography ==
- Ulrich & Brigitte Hallier (2012): The People of Iheren and Tahilahi. The World of Petroglyphs, Part 39.

== Notes and References ==
Part of this edit is taken from the existing English Wikipedia article at Rock art of Iheren and Tahilahi; see its history for attribution.
