= Adjahil =

- Village
- Location within Algeria
- Coordinates: 24°31′47″N 9°29′30″E
- Country: Algeria
- Province: Djanet Province
- District: Djanet District
- Commune: Djanet
- Elevation: 1,025 m (3,363 ft)
- Time zone: UTC+1 (CET)

Adjahil (also written Ajahil) is a village in the commune of Djanet, in Djanet District, Djanet Province, Algeria. It is in the same valley as the district capital Djanet, which is 3 kilometres (1.9 mi) to the north. Along with the other localities near Djanet it lies on the south-western edge of the Tassili n'Ajjer mountain range.
