= Azelouaz =

- Village
- Location within Algeria
- Coordinates: 24°34′15″N 9°28′18″E
- Country: Algeria
- Province: Djanet Province
- District: Djanet District
- Commune: Djanet
- Elevation: 1,044 m (3,425 ft)
- Time zone: UTC+1 (CET)

Azelouaz is a village in the commune of Djanet, in Djanet District, Djanet Province, Algeria. It is in the same valley as the district capital Djanet, which is 2.5 kilometres (1.6 mi) to the south. Along with the other localities near Djanet it lies on the south-western edge of the Tassili n'Ajjer mountain range.
