= El Mihan =

- Village
- Location within Algeria
- Coordinates: 24°32′53″N 9°29′8″E
- Country: Algeria
- Province: Djanet Province
- District: Djanet District
- Commune: Djanet
- Elevation: 1,056 m (3,465 ft)
- Time zone: UTC+1 (CET)

El Mihan is a village in the commune of Djanet, in Djanet District, Djanet Province, Algeria. It is in the same valley as the district capital Djanet, which is 1 kilometre (0.62 mi) to the north. Along with the other localities near Djanet it lies on the south-western edge of the Tassili n'Ajjer mountain range.
