= Eferi =

- Village
- Location within Algeria
- Coordinates: 24°28′36″N 9°30′47″E
- Country: Algeria
- Province: Djanet Province
- District: Djanet District
- Commune: Djanet
- Elevation: 1,027 m (3,369 ft)
- Time zone: UTC+1 (CET)

Eferi is a village in the commune of Djanet, in Djanet District, Djanet Province, Algeria. Along with the other localities near Djanet it lies at the south-western edge of the Tassili n'Ajjer mountain range.
