= Tin El Koum =

Tin El Koum تين الكوم
- Village
- Location within Algeria
- Coordinates: 24°35′26″N 10°11′40″E
- Country: Algeria
- Province: Djanet Province
- District: Djanet District
- Commune: Djanet
- Elevation: 735 m (2,411 ft)
- Time zone: UTC+1 (CET)

Tin El Koum (also written Tin Alkoum; Arabic: تين الكوم) is a village in the commune of Djanet, in Djanet District, Djanet Province, Algeria. It is located in the same valley as Ghat in Libya, deep within the south-eastern Tassili N'Ajjer mountain range, east of Djanet. It is the location of a border crossing into Libya which is controlled by independent Tuareg militias in the Libyan civil war.

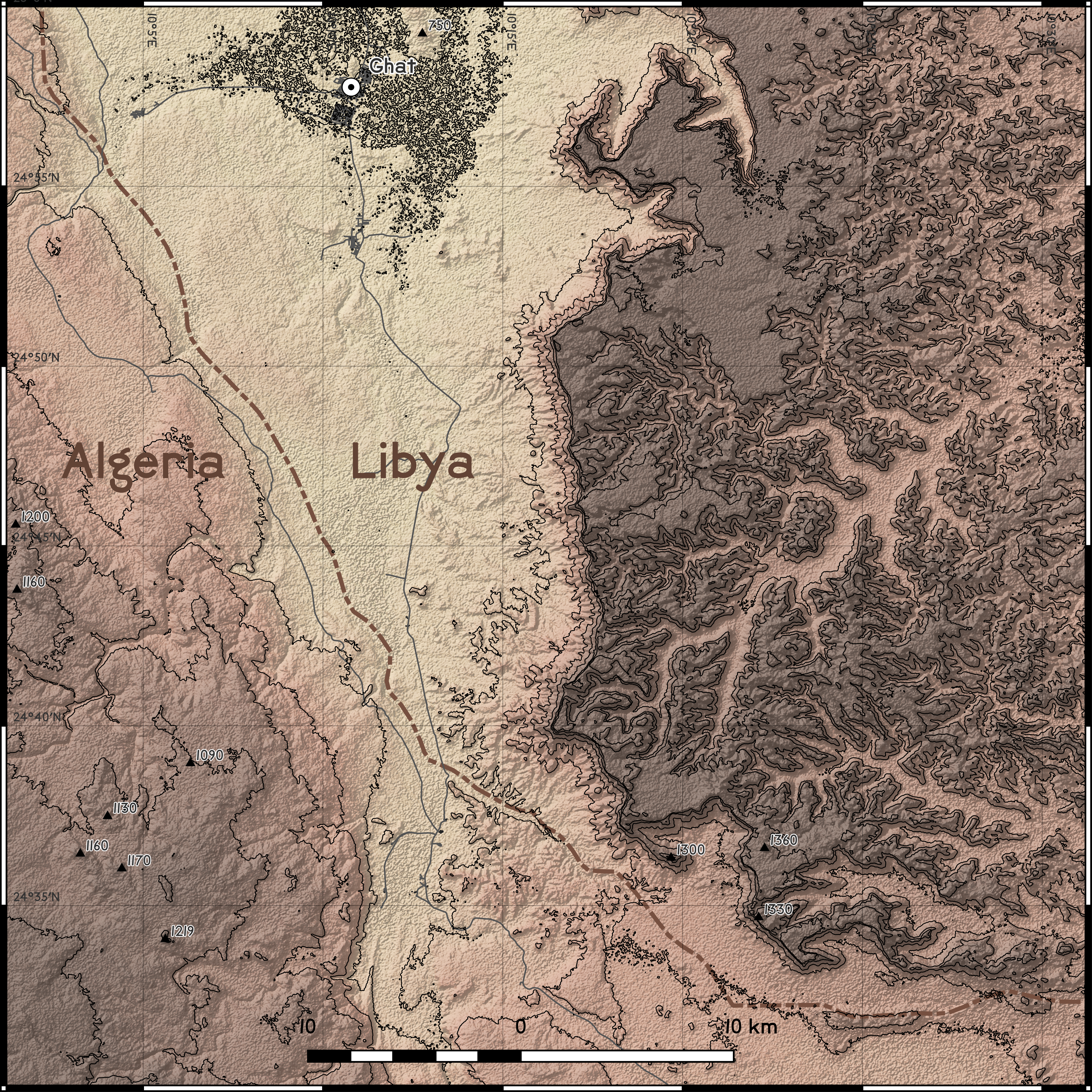
Topographic map of the Algerian-Libyan border at Tin-Alkoum
