= La vache qui pleure =

La vache qui pleure may refer to:

- La vache qui pleure (rock engravings), in Algeria
- La vache qui pleure (album) by Kate & Anna McGarrigle, 2003
