= Erg Admer =

Coordinates: 24°13′N 9°14′E

- Erg
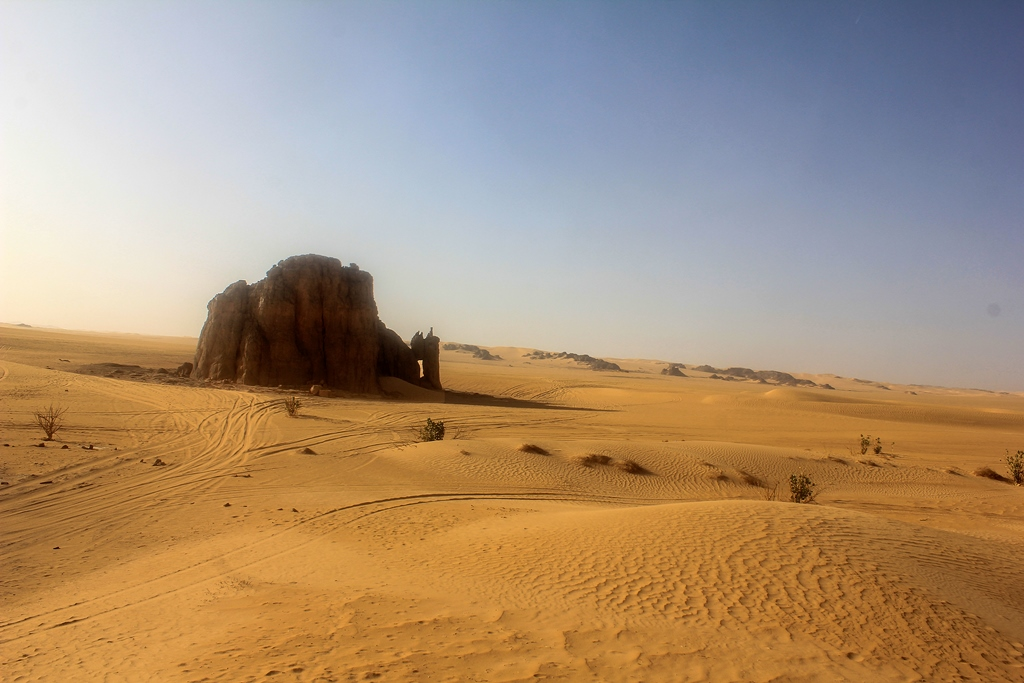
- Erg Admer with rock containing gravings of La vache qui pleure
- Interactive map of Erg Admer
- Country: Algeria
- Elevation: 730 m (2,400 ft)

The Erg Admer is a large erg or field of sand dunes in the Sahara Desert. Situated in the Illizi Province west of the oasis town of Djanet in south-eastern Algeria, the erg covers an area some 20 km wide by some 100 km large north to south. It originates in the centre of Tassili n'Ajjer, towards Essendilène and extends southwards to reach Ténéré at the Niger border.

Assemblages of lithic industry have been discovered, such as Acheulean and Aterian hand axes. To the east of Erg Admer there is the Tighaghart, which is famous for La vache qui pleure rock engravings.
