= Iherir =

- Village
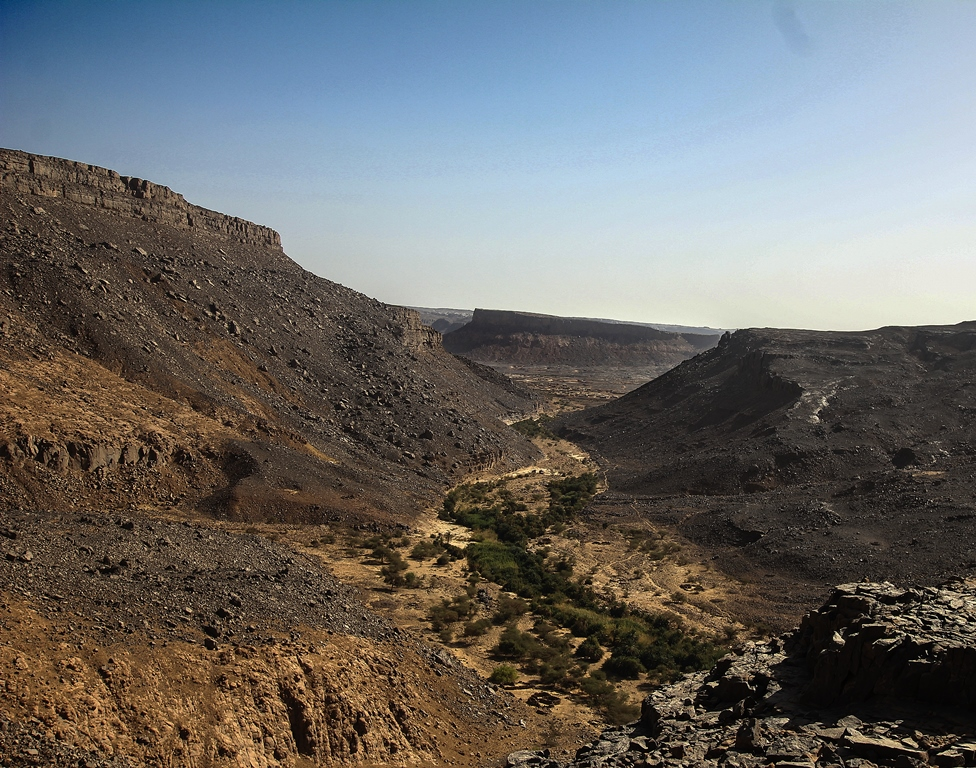
- The valley of Iherir

- Location within Algeria
- Coordinates: 25°24′43″N 8°24′47″E
- Country: Algeria
- Province: Djanet Province
- Commune: Bordj El Houasse
- Elevation: 1,070 m (3,510 ft)

Population (2020)
  - Total: 1,500
- Time zone: UTC+1 (CET)

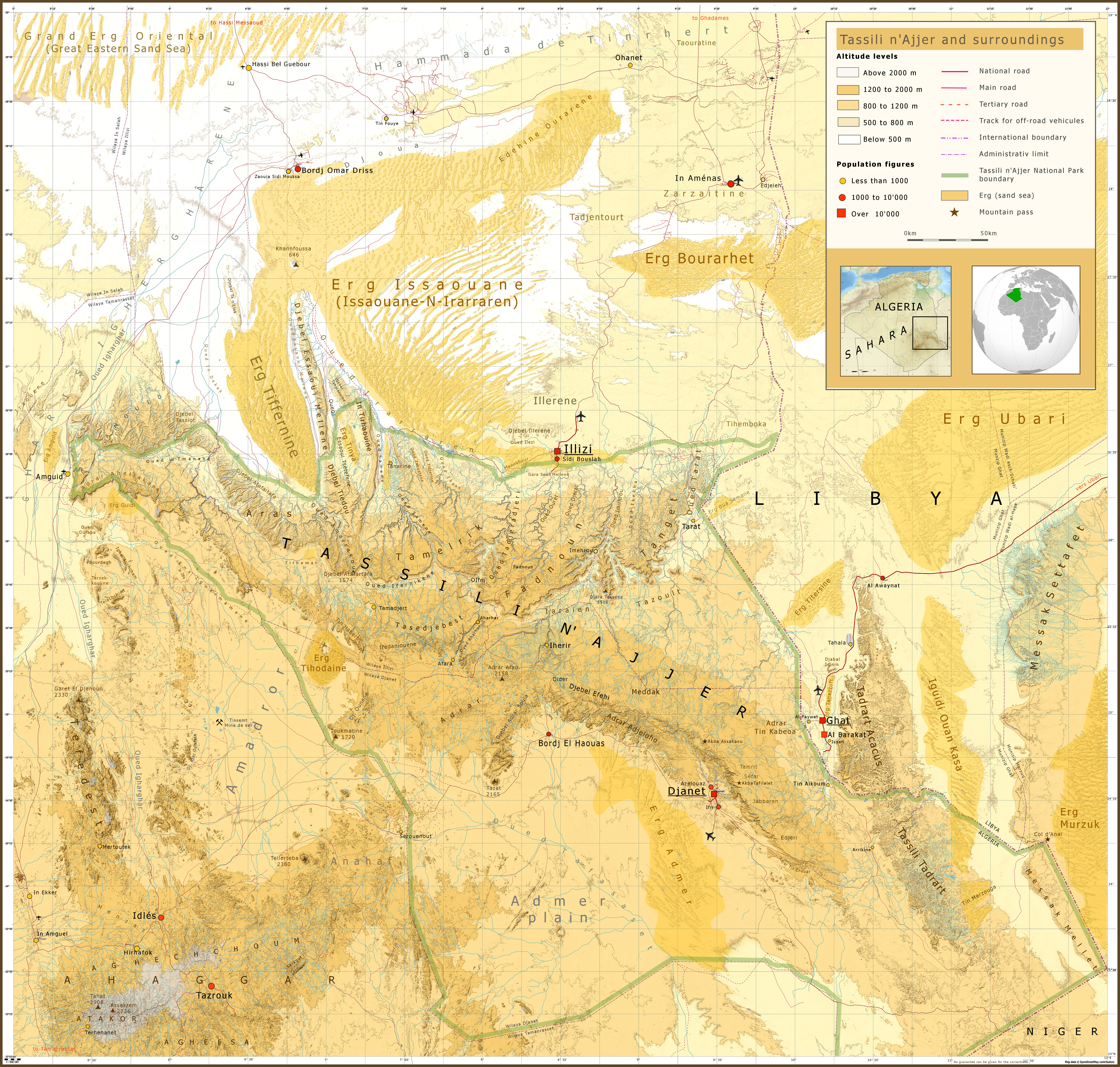
Map of Tassili n'Ajjer with Iherir close to the N of TASSILI N'AJJER

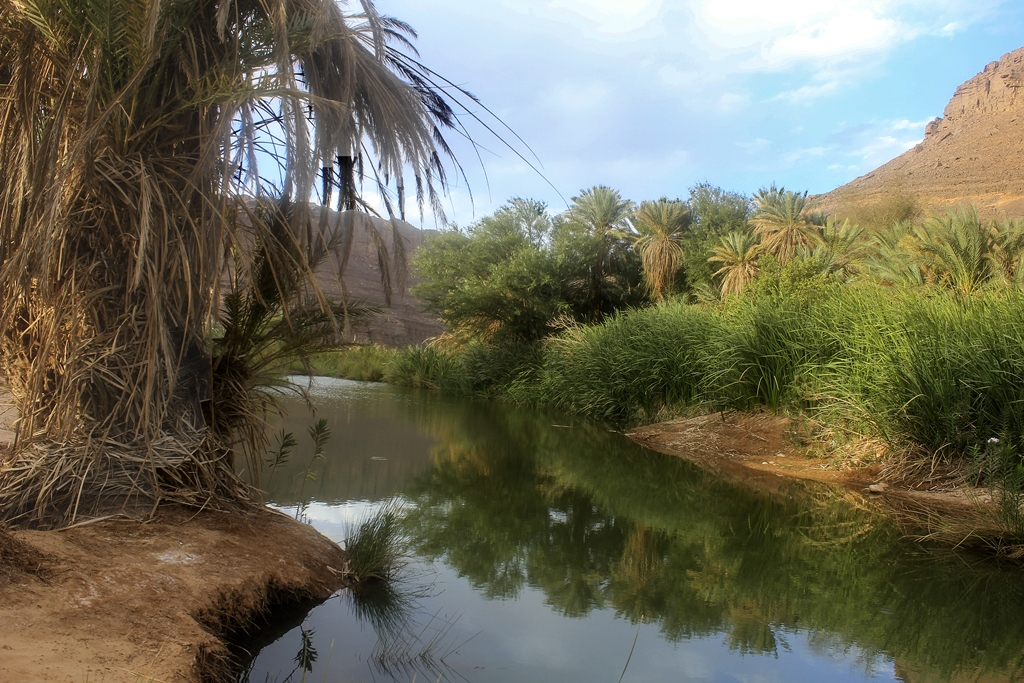
A guelta in Iherir

Iherir (also written Ihrir) is a village in the commune of Bordj El Houasse, in Djanet Province, Algeria. It is in a river valley (wadi) named Oued Iherir near the center of the Tassili n'Ajjer mountain range, 121 kilometres (75 mi) south of the provincial capital Illizi. The area has been populated since Neolithic times; the population living in the valley (including a village to the southeast called Idarane) has continuously been over 1,000 during the 20th century.

== Geography ==
Iherir is located at an elevation of 1,070 metres (3,510 ft) above sea level. Its valley is an oasis containing gueltas and numerous date palms. The town is notable for the dramatic rocky mountain ranges that rise as much as 300 metres (980 ft) on all sides. Prehistoric art dated to 9000 BC is found in the Iheren sites on the nearby Tadjelahine plateau. The valley is protected as a nature park, but protection applies only to the frescoes, not to the fauna or flora. It is also considered a "wetland of global interest" by the Ramsar Convention (2001).

The gueltas near Iherir are flanked by Cape bulrush (Typha capensis), with oleanders (Nerium oleander) and French Tamarisks (Tamarix gallica) abundant along the river bed. Notable animals include jungle cats (Felis chaus) and sand cats (Felis margarita).

== Climate ==
Iherir has a hot desert climate (Köppen climate classification BWh), with very hot summers and mild winters, and very little precipitation throughout the year. Rainfall is very erratic, with as much as 150 millimetres (5.9 in) falling locally in some years due storms resulting from the temporary extension of the Intertropical Convergence Zone into the area. When rain does fall, water may flow continuously in Oued Iherir for as long as six months. Snow has been recorded several times on the highest nearby mountains.

Climate data for Iherir
Month	Jan	Feb	Mar	Apr	May	Jun	Jul	Aug	Sep	Oct	Nov	Dec	Year
Mean daily maximum °C (°F)	19.1 (66.4)	22.2 (72.0)	26.5 (79.7)	31.3 (88.3)	35.7 (96.3)	39 (102)	38.8 (101.8)	38.1 (100.6)	36.4 (97.5)	32.0 (89.6)	26.2 (79.2)	20.8 (69.4)	30.5 (86.9)
Daily mean °C (°F)	11.7 (53.1)	14.5 (58.1)	18.9 (66.0)	23.6 (74.5)	28.3 (82.9)	31.8 (89.2)	31.6 (88.9)	31.1 (88.0)	29.1 (84.4)	24.5 (76.1)	18.9 (66.0)	13.6 (56.5)	23.1 (73.6)
Mean daily minimum °C (°F)	4.3 (39.7)	6.8 (44.2)	11.3 (52.3)	16.0 (60.8)	20.9 (69.6)	24.6 (76.3)	24.5 (76.1)	24.1 (75.4)	21.8 (71.2)	17.0 (62.6)	11.7 (53.1)	6.5 (43.7)	15.8 (60.4)
Average precipitation mm (inches)	2 (0.1)	1 (0.0)	5 (0.2)	1 (0.0)	2 (0.1)	3 (0.1)	0 (0)	1 (0.0)	2 (0.1)	3 (0.1)	1 (0.0)	3 (0.1)	24 (0.8)
Source: climate-data.org

== Economy ==
The local economy is centered on agriculture, with production of wheat, dates, figs, grapes, and root crops. Camels, cattle and goats are grazed, and fishing from the gueltas is also significant. There is also some tourism associated mainly with the nearby frescoes.

== Transportation ==
There are no paved roads to the town, which is accessible only by rough tracks. The main track leads south to the N3 national highway between Illizi and Bordj El Houasse.
