= Bordj El Houasse =

Bordj El Houas ﺑﺮ ج اﻟﺤﻮاس
- Town and Commune
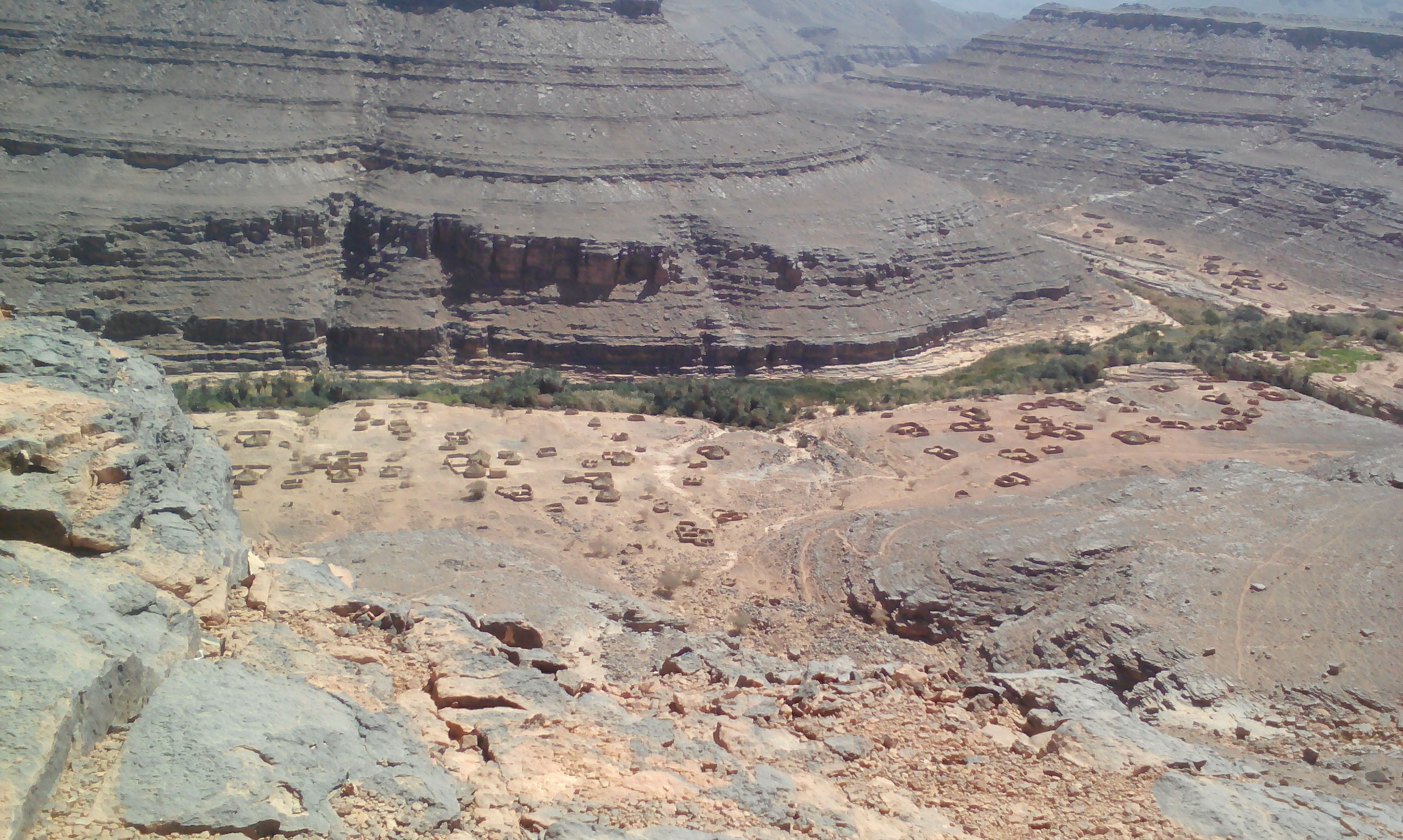

- Location of Bordj El Houas Commune within Djanet Province

- Location of Bordj El Houas within Algeria
- Coordinates: 24°52′44″N 8°26′35″E
- Country: Algeria
- Province: Djanet
- District: Djanet

Government
  - PMA Seats: 7

Area
  - Total: 28,725 km^{2} (11,091 sq mi)

Population (2008)
  - Total: 2,963
  - Density: 0.1032/km^{2} (0.2672/sq mi)
- Time zone: UTC+01 (CET)
- ONS code: 3305

Bordj El Houas (also written Bordj El Haouas or Bordj El Haouès) is a town and commune in Djanet District, Djanet Province, Algeria. It is part of Djanet District. According to the 2008 census it has a population of 2,963, up from 2,185 in 1998, and an annual population growth rate of 3.2%. Its municipal code is 3305.

== Geography ==
Bordj El Houasse lies at an elevation of 1,094 metres (3,589 ft) on a flat rocky plateau, beneath the Tassili n'Ajjer mountain range that rises 15 kilometres (9.3 mi) to the north and northwest. An intermittent river (wadi) passes by the town to the southwest, flowing from northwest to southeast out of the mountains.

== Climate ==
Bordj El Houasse has a hot desert climate (Köppen climate classification BWh), with very hot summers and mild winters, and very little precipitation throughout the year.

Climate data for Bordj El Houasse
Month	Jan	Feb	Mar	Apr	May	Jun	Jul	Aug	Sep	Oct	Nov	Dec	Year
Mean daily maximum °C (°F)	19.1 (66.4)	22.1 (71.8)	26.4 (79.5)	31.3 (88.3)	35.6 (96.1)	38.5 (101.3)	38.2 (100.8)	37.4 (99.3)	35.8 (96.4)	31.7 (89.1)	26.3 (79.3)	20.9 (69.6)	30.3 (86.5)
Daily mean °C (°F)	11.9 (53.4)	14.6 (58.3)	19 (66)	23.8 (74.8)	28.4 (83.1)	31.6 (88.9)	31.4 (88.5)	30.7 (87.3)	28.8 (83.8)	24.5 (76.1)	19.2 (66.6)	13.9 (57.0)	23.1 (73.6)
Mean daily minimum °C (°F)	4.8 (40.6)	7.1 (44.8)	11.7 (53.1)	16.4 (61.5)	21.2 (70.2)	24.7 (76.5)	24.6 (76.3)	24.1 (75.4)	21.9 (71.4)	17.3 (63.1)	12.1 (53.8)	7.0 (44.6)	16.1 (60.9)
Average precipitation mm (inches)	1 (0.0)	2 (0.1)	4 (0.2)	1 (0.0)	2 (0.1)	2 (0.1)	0 (0)	1 (0.0)	2 (0.1)	2 (0.1)	2 (0.1)	2 (0.1)	21 (0.9)
Source: climate-data.org

== Transportation ==
The town of Bordj El Houas lies at the intersection between the N3 highway (to Illizi in the north and Djanet to the east) and the N55 highway to the south (to Idlès and, via the N1, Tamanrasset). A local road also leads west to the village of Tabakat to the west. The nearest airport is Djanet Inedbirene Airport.

== Education ==
2.2% of the population has a tertiary education (the lowest rate in the province), and another 7.7% has completed secondary education. The overall literacy rate is 60.9%, and is 77.6% among males and 40.5% among females; all three rates are the lowest in the province.

== Localities ==
The commune is composed of two localities:

- Bordj El Houas
- Iherir
