= La vache qui pleure (rock engravings) =

Rock engravings in Algeria

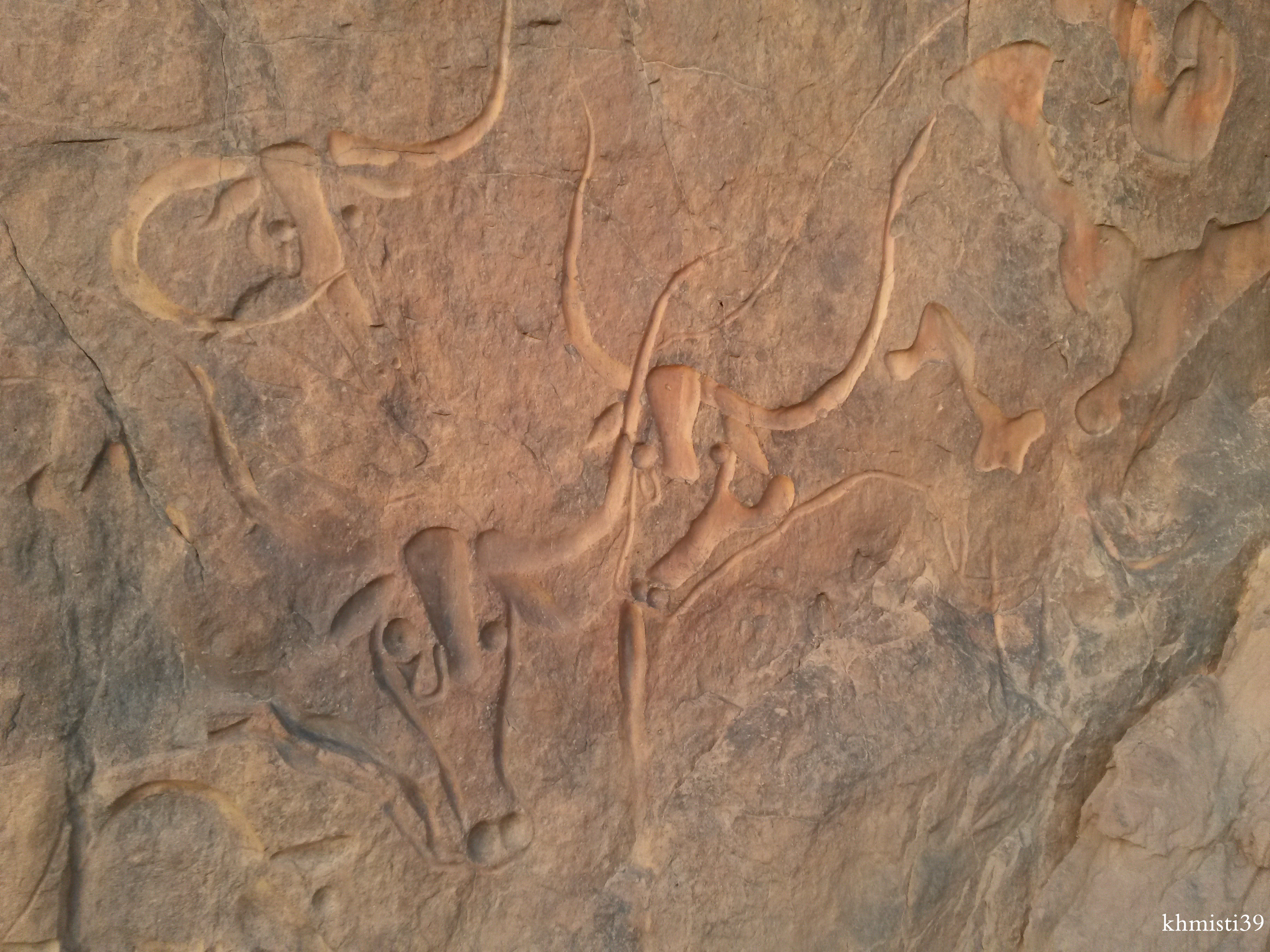
- Type: Petroglyphs
- Location: Algeria

History
- Built: c. 5000 BC

About 25 km from the oasis of Djanet in southeast Algeria, on the eastern border of erg Admer towards Tassili n'Ajjer in the Tigharghart region, stands a large sand monolith. On one side of the rocks of the monolith are the rock engravings of La vache qui pleure (the crying cow), dated more than 7,000 years ago.

The rock engravings of La vache qui pleure are a masterpiece of Neolithic sculpture. Carried out in bas-relief, the engravings are of extraordinary workmanship and harmony, made of deep grooves carved into the rock. Leaning towards a small depression at the foot of the rock, the engravings represent a small herd of bovidae. The cows seem to be waiting for the water to arrive to drink from it. The tears shed by a number of these cows have given rise to many interpretations and legends.

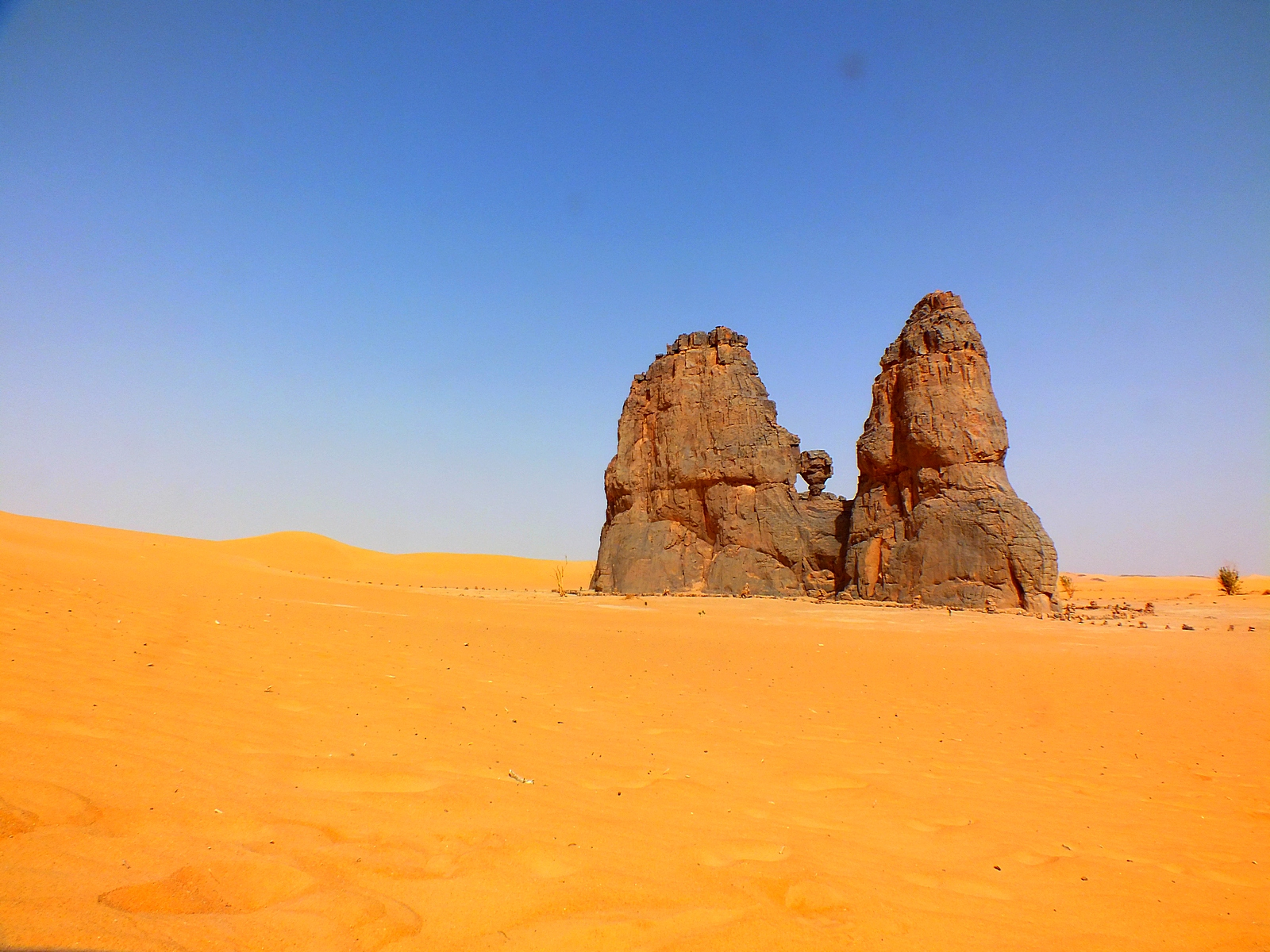
Monolith containing the rock engravings of La vache qui pleure

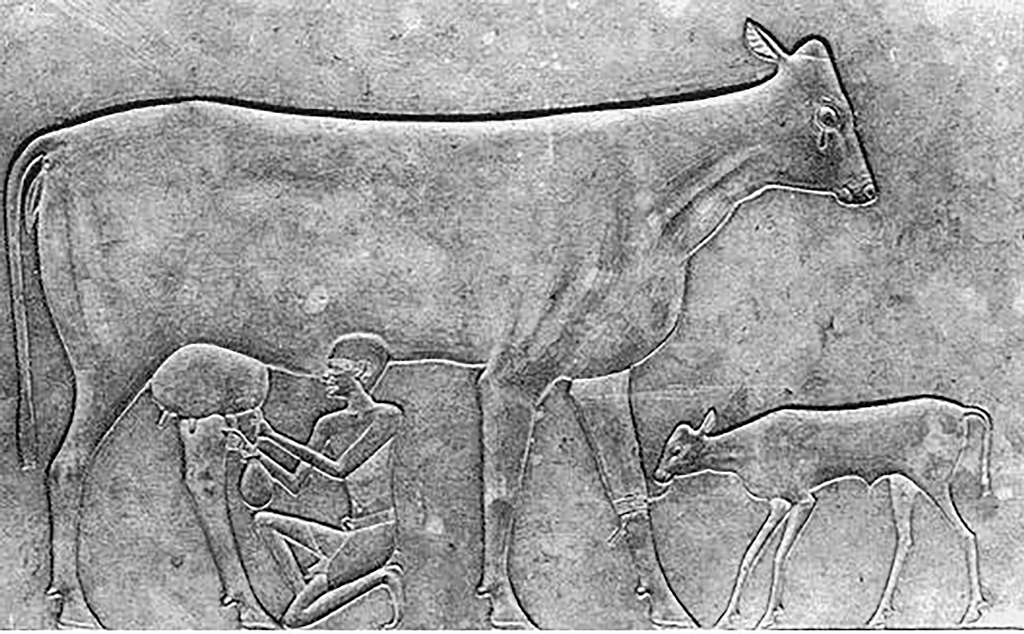
Sarcophagus of queen Kawit showing a tear falling from a cow's eye

A bas-relief in the sarcophagus of queen Kawit, wife of King Mentuhotep II of the 11th Dynasty, also shows a tear falling from a cow's eye while it is being milked.
