= Rock art of Iheren and Tahilahi =

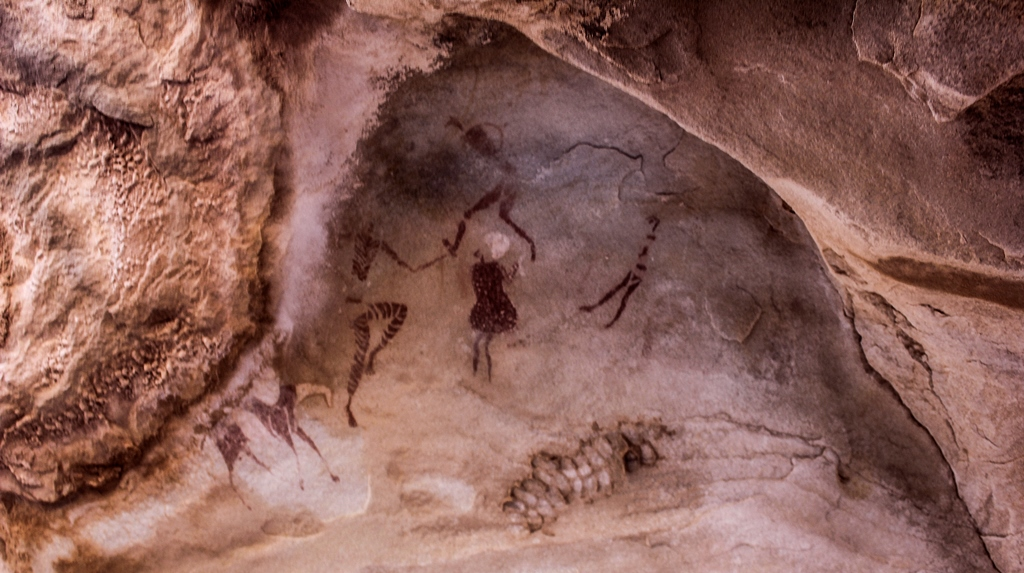
Rock paintings of Iheren

Map of rock art in the Sahara

Iheren (or Eheren) and Tahilahi are rock painting shelters at the Tadjelahine sandstone plateau some 20 km west of Iherir in the Tassili n'Ajjer mountains in southeast Algeria.

== Description ==
The two shelters, situated 8 km from each other, show small-sized rock pictures executed in the Iheren–Tahilahi style of painting of Saharan rock art, a naturalist style of the Bovidian Period chronologically located around 4500 BCE to 2200 BCE.

The frescoes, painted in light ochre tones, represent pastoral Neolithic every-day-life activities of human beings of Mediterranean look with full hair and clear-cut faces. The fauna comprises wild and domestic animals. The long-horned cattle is the most commonly depicted animal. Frequently, sheep and goats appear, suggesting the ongoing aridification of the Saharan climate. Pastoral scenes predominate. The figures, herdsmen or hunters, are represented with a remarkable sense of detail: headdress, clothing and weapons. Wildlife is represented by antelopes, giraffes and ostriches.

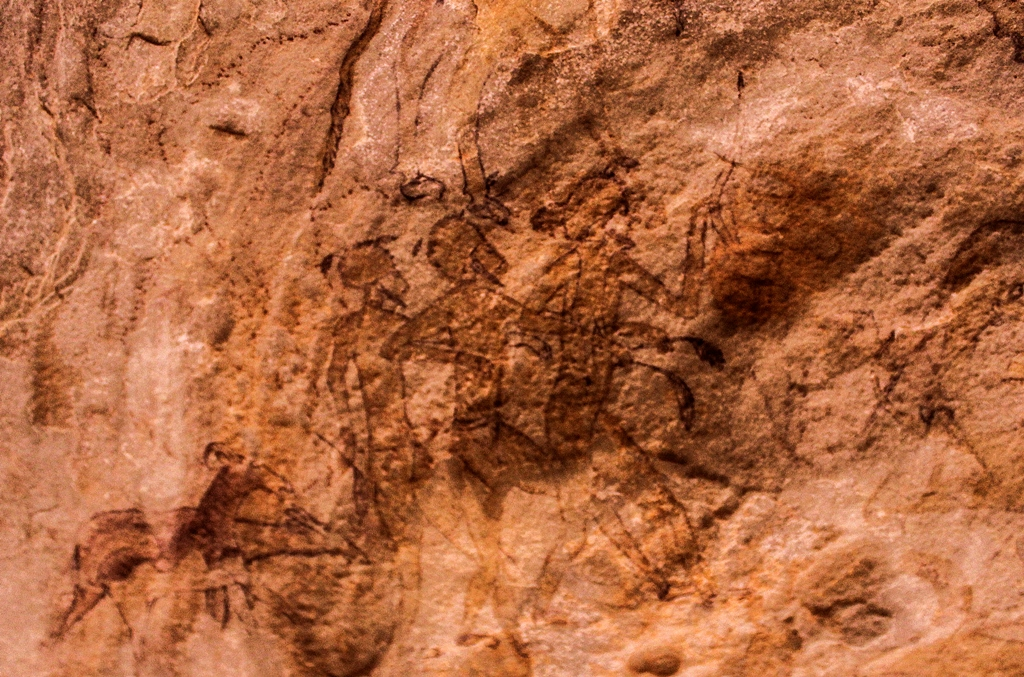
Rock paintings of Iheren

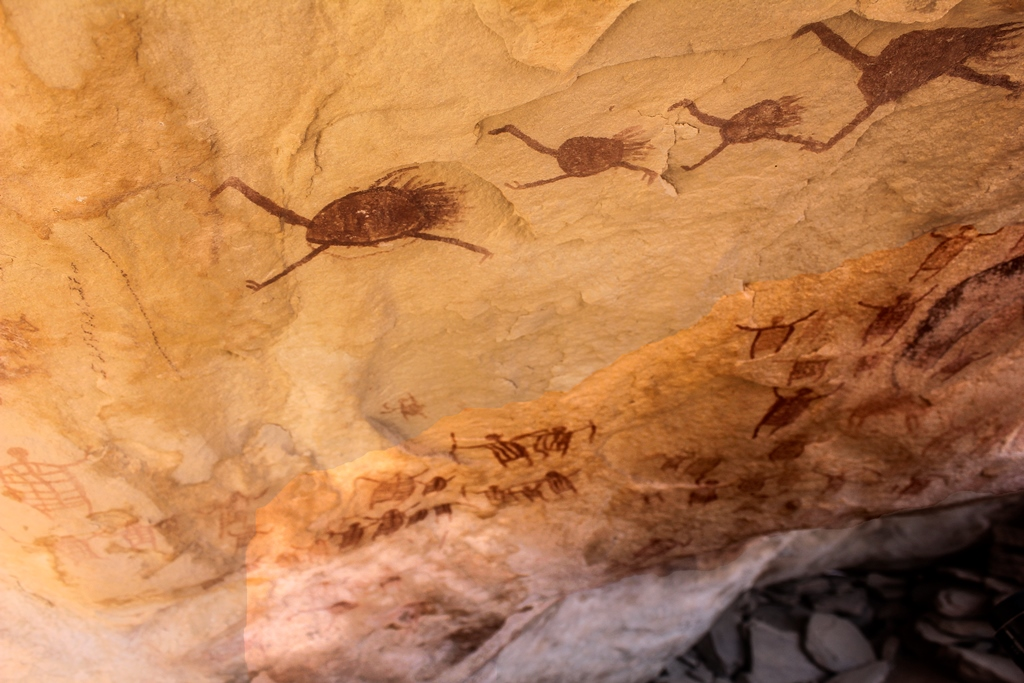
Rock paintings of Iheren

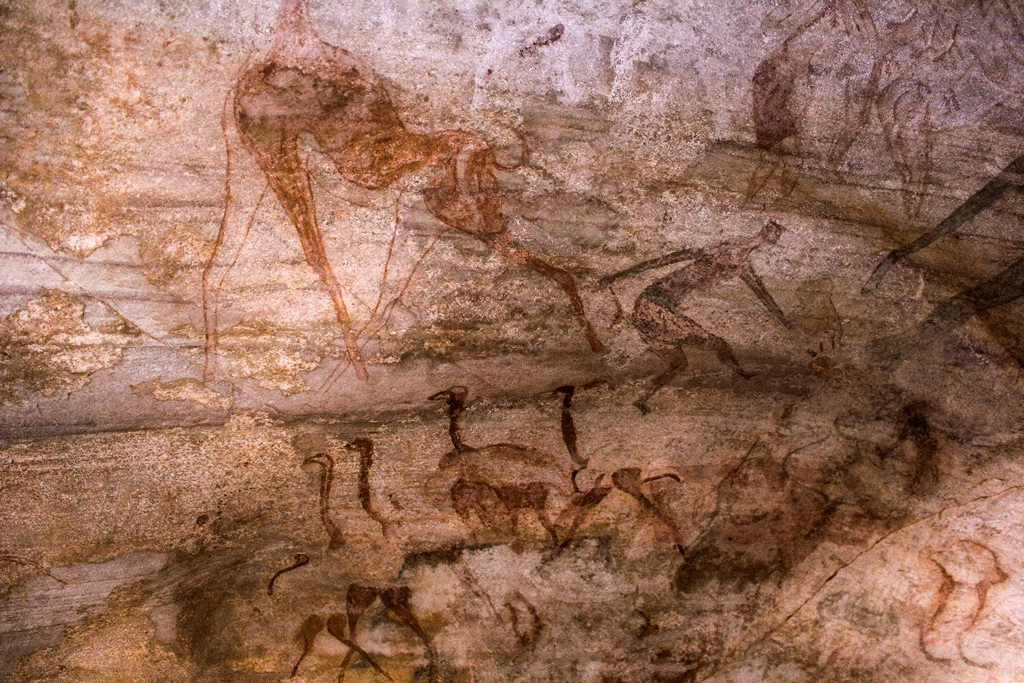
Rock paintings of Iheren
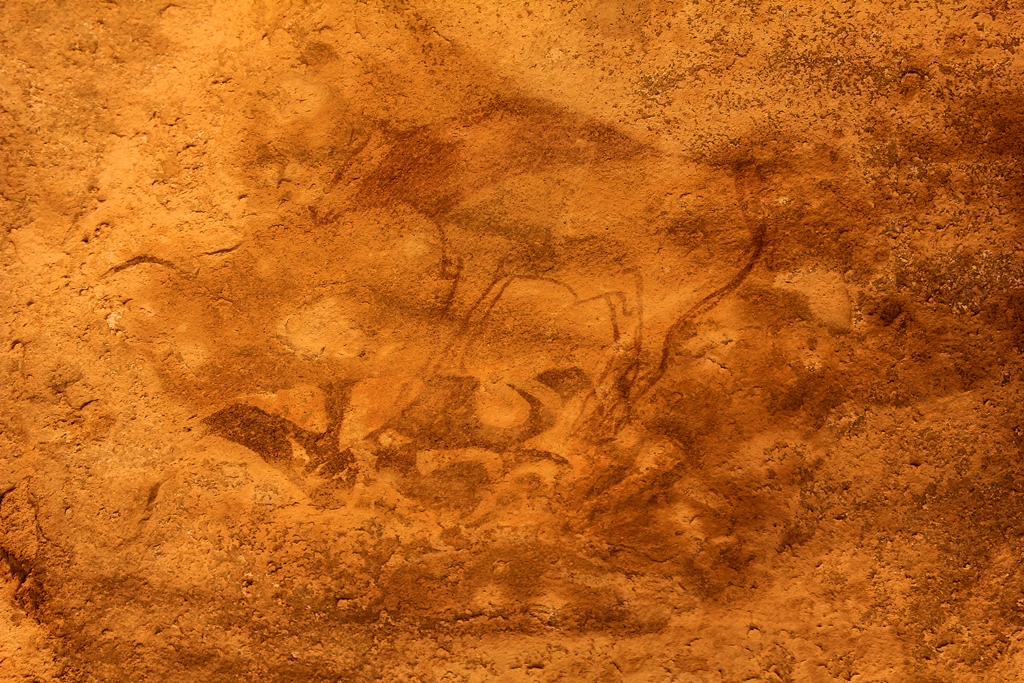
Rock paintings of Iheren

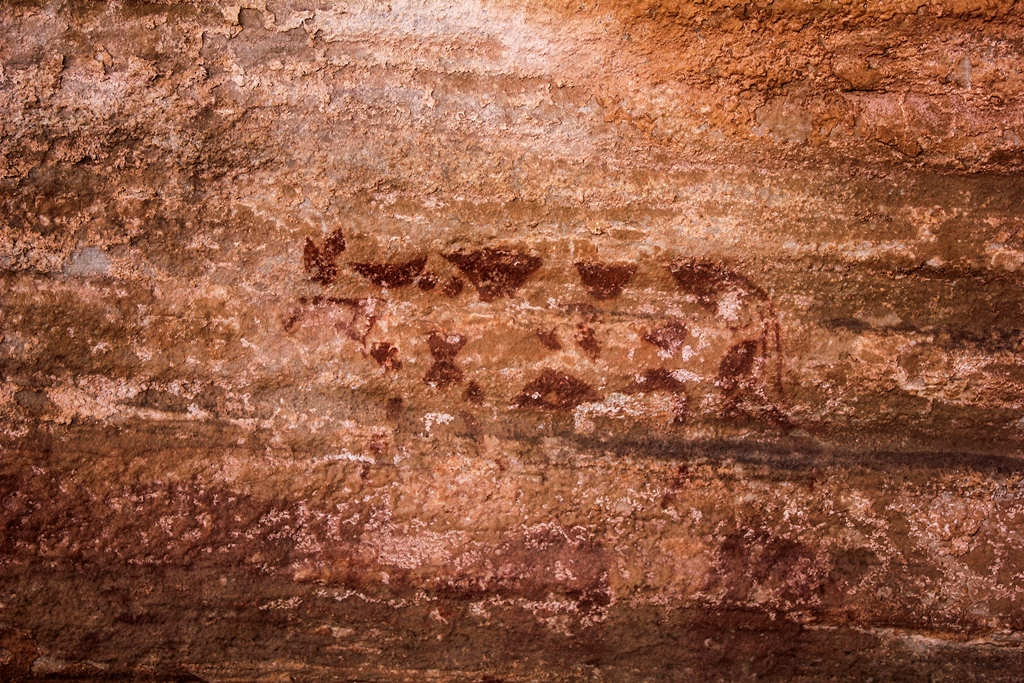
Rock paintings of Iheren

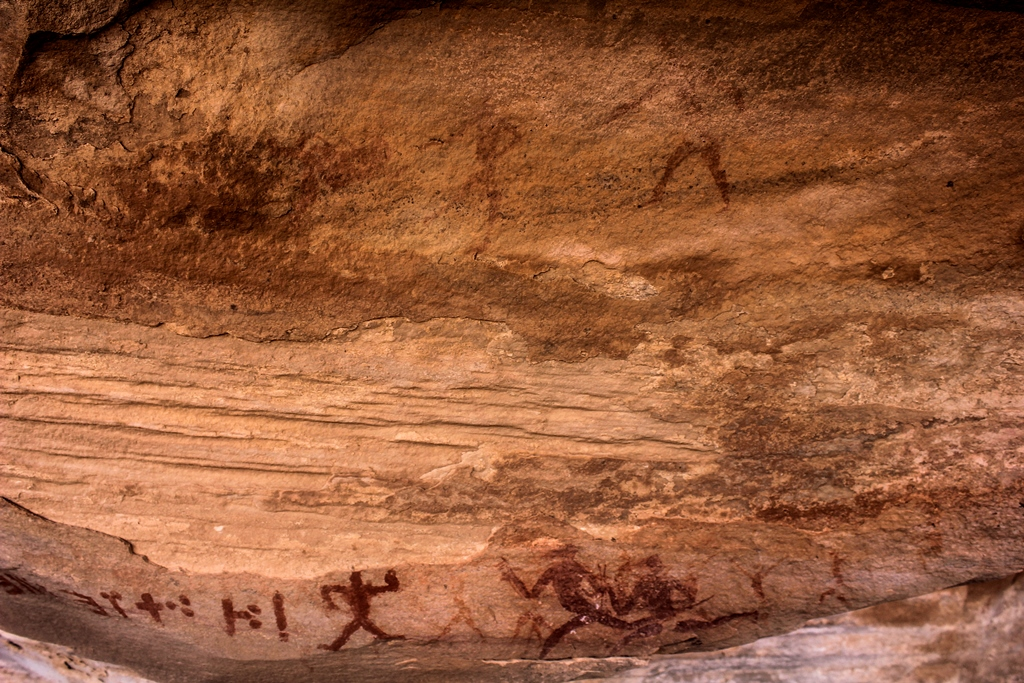
Rock paintings of Iheren: Camel period, the final period of rock art in the Sahara. with inscriptions in Tifinagh
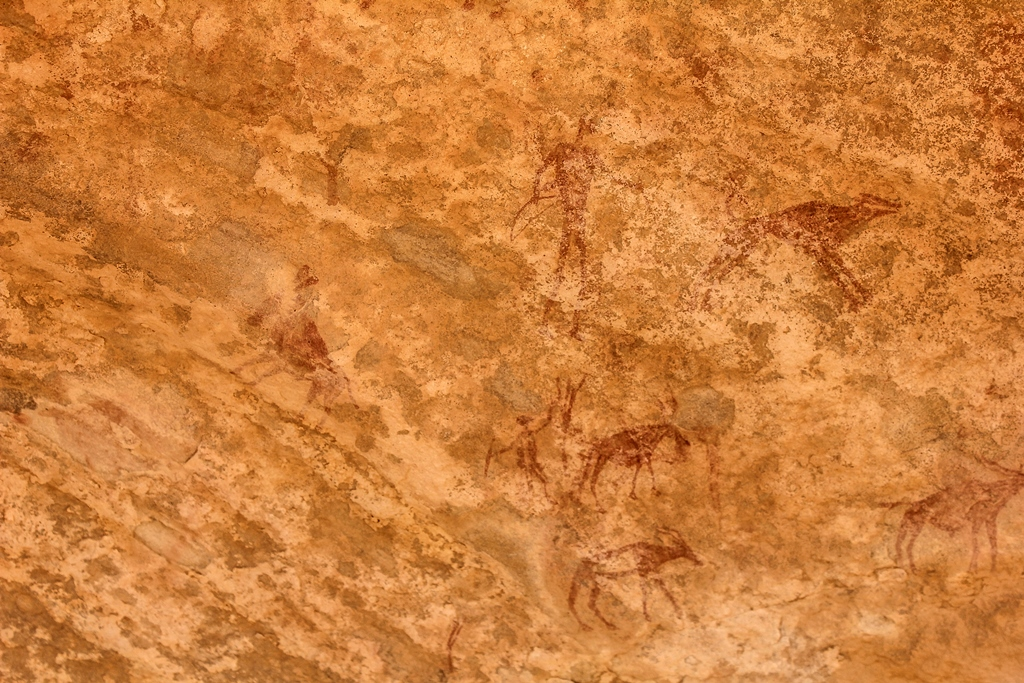
Rock paintings of Iheren

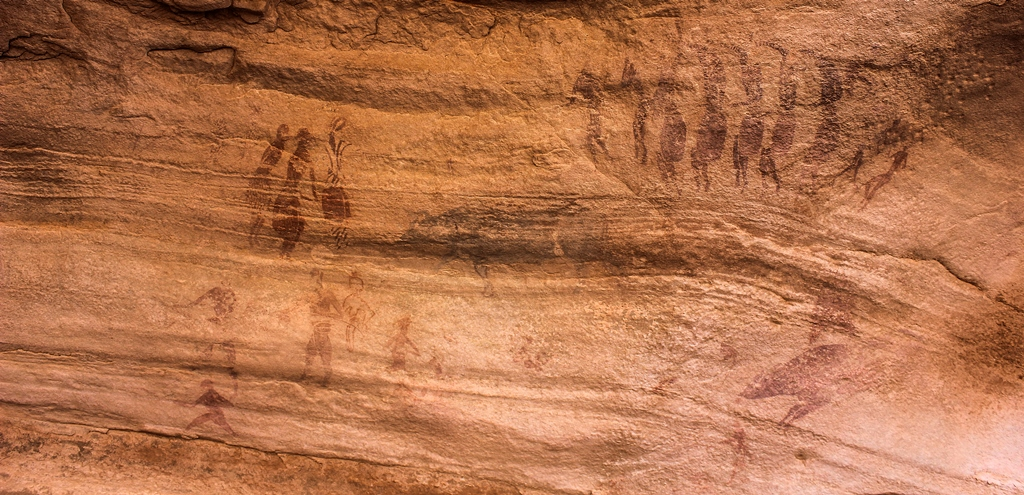
Rock paintings of Iheren
