= Djanet =

Djanet ﺟﺎﻧﺖ
- Town and commune
- A view of Djanet

- Location of Djanet Commune within Djanet Province
- Interactive map of Djanet
- Location of Djanet within Algeria
- Coordinates: 24°33′18″N 9°29′7″E
- Country: Algeria
- Province: Djanet
- District: Djanet (seat)

Government
  - PMA Seats: 7

Area
  - Total: 57,460 km^{2} (22,190 sq mi)
- Elevation: 1,035 m (3,396 ft)

Population (2008)
  - Total: 14,655
  - Density: 0.2550/km^{2} (0.6606/sq mi)
- Time zone: UTC+01 (CET)
- Postal code: 33100
- ONS code: 3302

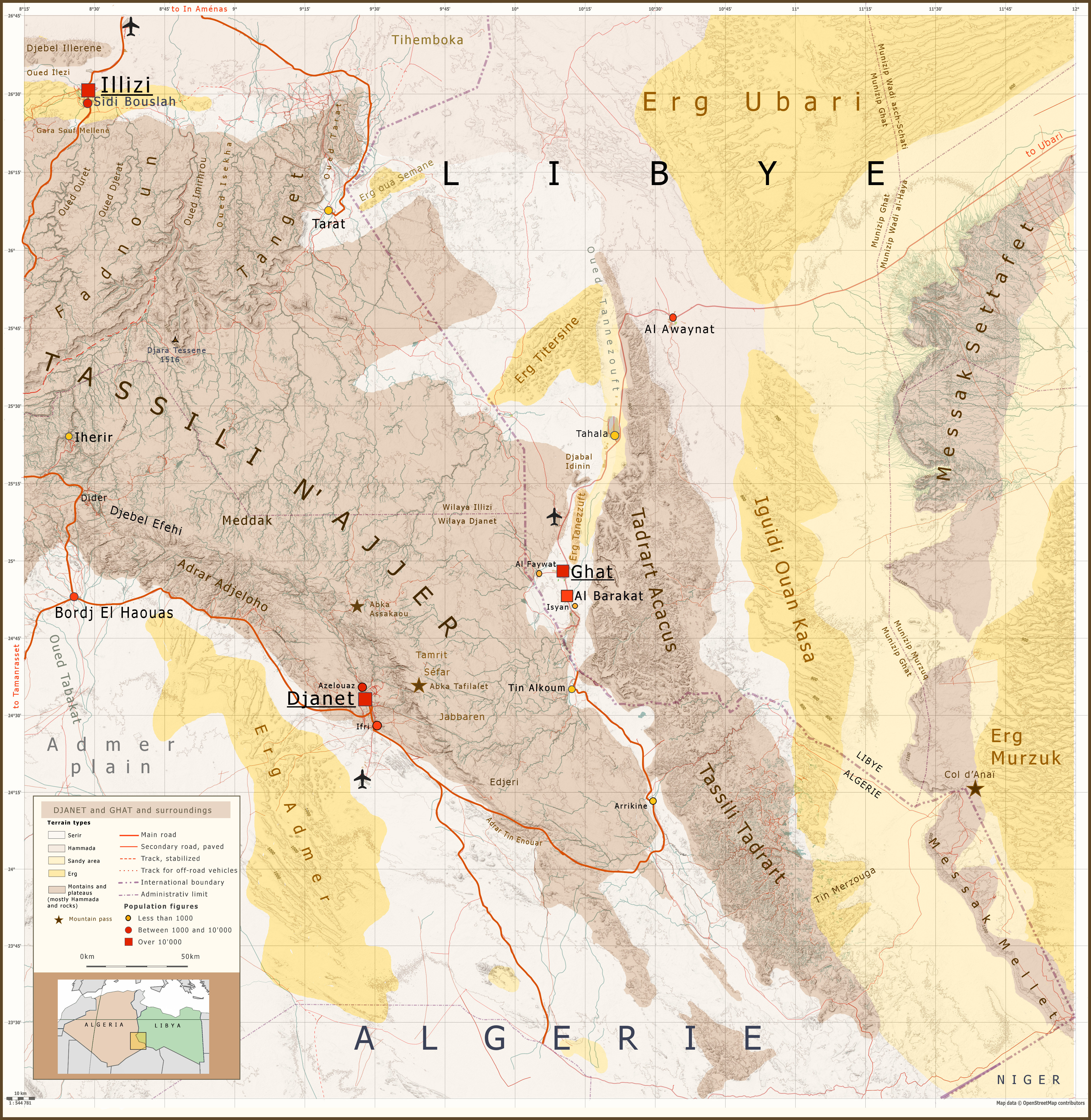
Topographic map with Djanet and the surrounding area

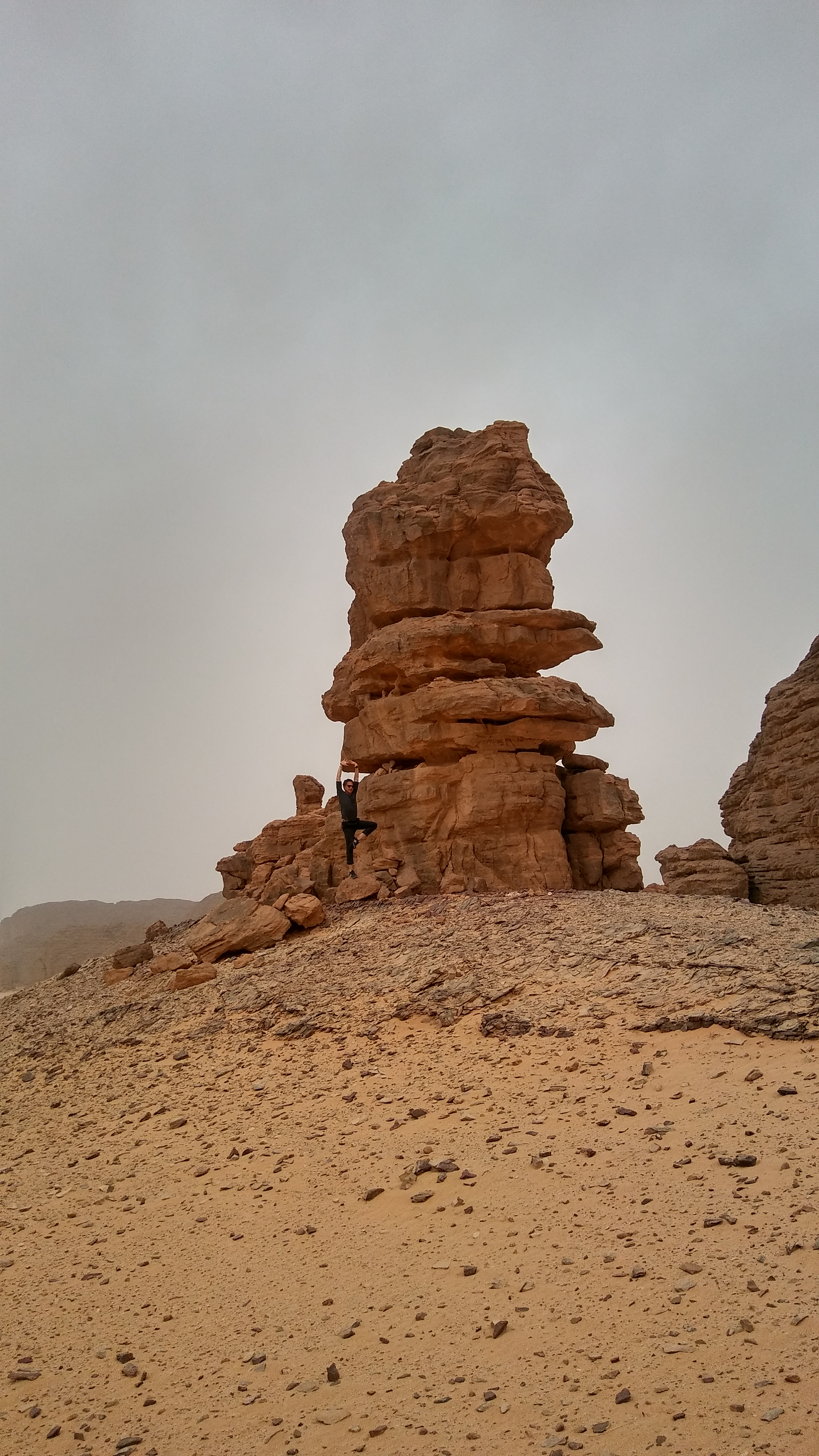

Djanet (Arabic: جانت; Berber: ⵊⴰⵏⴻⵜ, Janet) is an oasis city, and capital of Djanet District as well as of Djanet Province, southeast Algeria. It is located 412 km (256 mi) south of Illizi. According to the 2008 census it has a population of 14,655, up from 9,699 in 1998, and an annual population growth rate of 4.3%. It is inhabited by the Kel Ajjer Tuareg people.

== History ==
The region of Djanet has been inhabited since Neolithic times. There were periods of ten thousand years at a time that the area was not desert. The flora and fauna were luxuriant as is seen in the numerous rock paintings of Tassili n'Ajjer around Djanet. Populations of hunter-gatherers lived there.

Djanet was founded in the Middle Ages by the Tuareg. The Ottoman Empire, which had a nominal authority over the Fezzan region, reinforced their presence in the area at the beginning of the 20th century in reaction to the colonization of Africa by the Europeans.

== Geography ==
Djanet, and the nearby towns of Azelouaz, El Mihan, Adjahil and Eferi, lie in a valley carved by the intermittent river (wadi) Oued Idjeriou through the southwest edge of the Tassili n'Ajjer mountain range and east of the Erg Admer sand dunes. The Tadrart Rouge is located to the southeast and is a southern prolongation of the Libyan Tadrart Acacus.

Due to the somewhat cooler air, higher humidity and somewhat higher rainfall in these areas, the nearby mountains support a greater amount and variety of wildlife than lower-lying areas in the Sahara, and forms part of the West Saharan montane xeric woodlands ecosystem. Djanet itself lies at an altitude of 1,035 metres (3,396 ft), but the mountains to the east and north reach as high as 1,905 metres (6,250 ft).

== Climate ==
Djanet has a hot desert climate (Köppen climate classification BWh), with very hot summers and mild winters. The city is extremely dry throughout the year, with an annual average rainfall of just 14.6 millimetres (0.57 in) and no month with an average of more than 3 millimetres (0.12 in).

Climate data for Djanet (1991–2020)
Month	Jan	Feb	Mar	Apr	May	Jun	Jul	Aug	Sep	Oct	Nov	Dec	Year
Record high °C (°F)	31.4 (88.5)	34.4 (93.9)	36.2 (97.2)	41.0 (105.8)	49.0 (120.2)	44.0 (111.2)	48.5 (119.3)	46.4 (115.5)	42.0 (107.6)	39.7 (103.5)	33.4 (92.1)	33.4 (92.1)	49.0 (120.2)
Mean daily maximum °C (°F)	19.7 (67.5)	22.6 (72.7)	27.2 (81.0)	32.7 (90.9)	36.3 (97.3)	38.5 (101.3)	38.4 (101.1)	37.9 (100.2)	36.6 (97.9)	31.9 (89.4)	26.1 (79.0)	21.3 (70.3)	30.8 (87.4)
Daily mean °C (°F)	11.6 (52.9)	14.4 (57.9)	19.3 (66.7)	25.0 (77.0)	29.0 (84.2)	31.5 (88.7)	31.2 (88.2)	30.9 (87.6)	29.4 (84.9)	24.4 (75.9)	18.2 (64.8)	13.4 (56.1)	23.2 (73.8)
Mean daily minimum °C (°F)	3.5 (38.3)	6.3 (43.3)	11.5 (52.7)	17.2 (63.0)	21.7 (71.1)	24.4 (75.9)	23.9 (75.0)	23.9 (75.0)	22.2 (72.0)	17.0 (62.6)	10.2 (50.4)	5.4 (41.7)	15.6 (60.1)
Record low °C (°F)	−7.6 (18.3)	−3.6 (25.5)	0.8 (33.4)	5.7 (42.3)	10.4 (50.7)	17.0 (62.6)	18.0 (64.4)	14.0 (57.2)	11.0 (51.8)	5.4 (41.7)	0.5 (32.9)	−3.2 (26.2)	−7.6 (18.3)
Average precipitation mm (inches)	1.5 (0.06)	0.8 (0.03)	2.1 (0.08)	0.8 (0.03)	2.9 (0.11)	2.9 (0.11)	0.7 (0.03)	1.0 (0.04)	1.7 (0.07)	2.0 (0.08)	0.1 (0.00)	0.2 (0.01)	16.7 (0.66)
Average precipitation days (≥ 1.0 mm)	0.3	0.2	0.3	0.2	0.6	0.5	0.1	0.2	0.4	0.6	0.0	0.0	3.4
Average relative humidity (%)	35.3	29.3	22.7	18.7	18.0	18.2	16.6	18.4	20.4	26.6	28.1	33.2	23.8
Mean monthly sunshine hours	281.8	265.7	—	288.2	—	303.7	362.1	—	304.0	—	—	—	—
Source 1: NOAA
Source 2: climatebase.ru (extremes, humidity)

== Transport ==
Djanet Inedbirene Airport is located about 30 kilometers south of the city center.

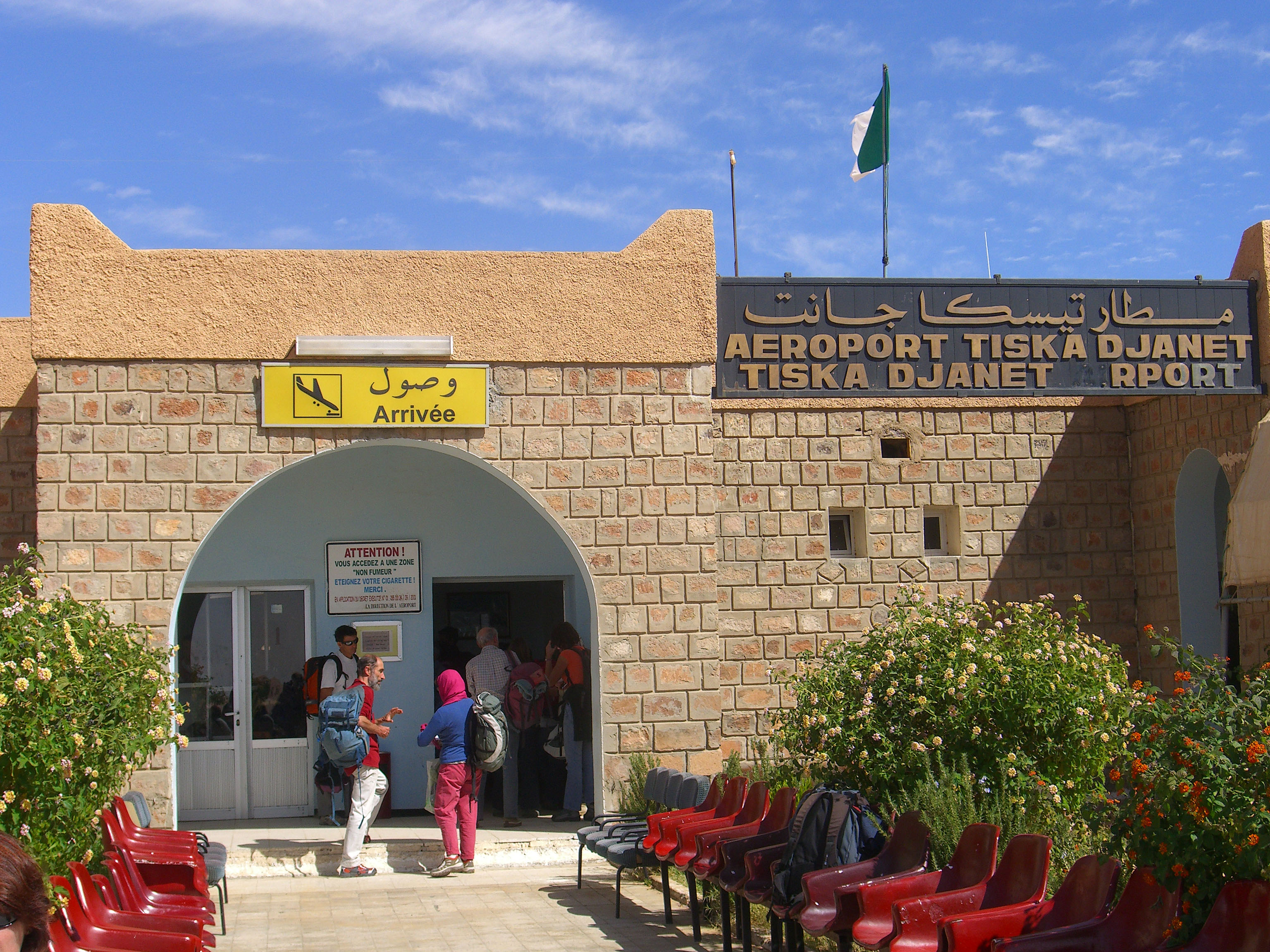
Djanet airport entrance

== Education ==
4.1% of the population has a tertiary education, and another 19.8% has completed secondary education. The overall literacy rate is 85.6%, and is 92.1% among males and 78.0% among females, all three rates being the highest for any commune in the province.

== Localities ==
The commune is composed of 12 localities:

- Centre Ville
- Azelouaz
- Tin Katma
- El Mihan
- Aghoum
- Adjahil
- Eferi
- In Abarbar
- Medak
- Arikin
- Tin El Koum
- Anijir

== See also ==
- Sebiba
