= Djanet District =

Djanet District دائرة جانت
- District
- Map of Algeria highlighting Djanet Province

- Location of Djanet District within Djanet Province
- Coordinates: 24°33′N 9°29′E
- Country: Algeria
- Province: Djanet
- District seat: Djanet

Area
  - Total: 86,185 km^{2} (33,276 sq mi)

Population (2008)
  - Total: 17,618
  - Density: 0.20442/km^{2} (0.52945/sq mi)
- Time zone: UTC+01 (CET)
- Communes: 2

Djanet is a district in Djanet Province, Algeria. It includes the easternmost point of the country. It was named after its capital, Djanet. It is the largest district of the province in population and in area.

== Municipalities ==
The district is further divided into 2 municipalities:

- Djanet
- Bordj El Houasse

== See also ==
- Sebiba
