= Djanet Province =

Province of Algeria

Djanet Province ولاية جانت
- Province
- Map of Algeria highlighting Djanet
- Coordinates: 24°33′15″N 9°29′05″E
- Country: Algeria
- Founded: 26 November 2019
- Capital: Djanet

Government
  - Wāli: M’Hamed Moumen

Area
  - Total: 86,185 km^{2} (33,276 sq mi)
- Elevation: 276 m (906 ft)

Population (2008)
  - Total: 17,618
  - Density: 0.20442/km^{2} (0.52945/sq mi)
- Time zone: UTC+01 (CET)
- Area code: +213 (0) 49
- ISO 3166 code: DZ-56
- Districts: 2
- Municipalities: 3

The wilaya of Djanet (Arabic: ولاية جانت) is an Algerian province created in 2019, previously, a delegated wilaya created in 2015. It is located in the Algerian Sahara.

== Geography ==
The wilaya of Djanet is in the Algerian Sahara; its area is 131,220 km² .

It is delimited by:

- to the north by the Illizi Province;
- to the east by Libya;
- to the west by the Tamanrasset Province;
- and to the south by the Tamanrasset Province and Niger.

== History ==
The wilaya of Djanet was created on November 26, 2019 .

Previously, it was a delegated wilaya, created according to the law n° 15–140 of May 27, 2015, creating administrative districts in certain wilayas and fixing the specific rules related to them, as well as the list of municipalities that are attached to it. Before 2019, it was attached to the Illizi Province.

== Organization of the wilaya ==
During the administrative breakdown of 2015, the delegated wilaya of Djanet is made up of 1 district and 2 communes.

=== List of walis ===
District	Commune	Arabic
Djanet District	Bordj El Houasse	ﺑﺮ ج اﻟﺤﻮاس
Djanet District	Djanet	ﺟﺎﻧﺖ
