= Forensic mycology =

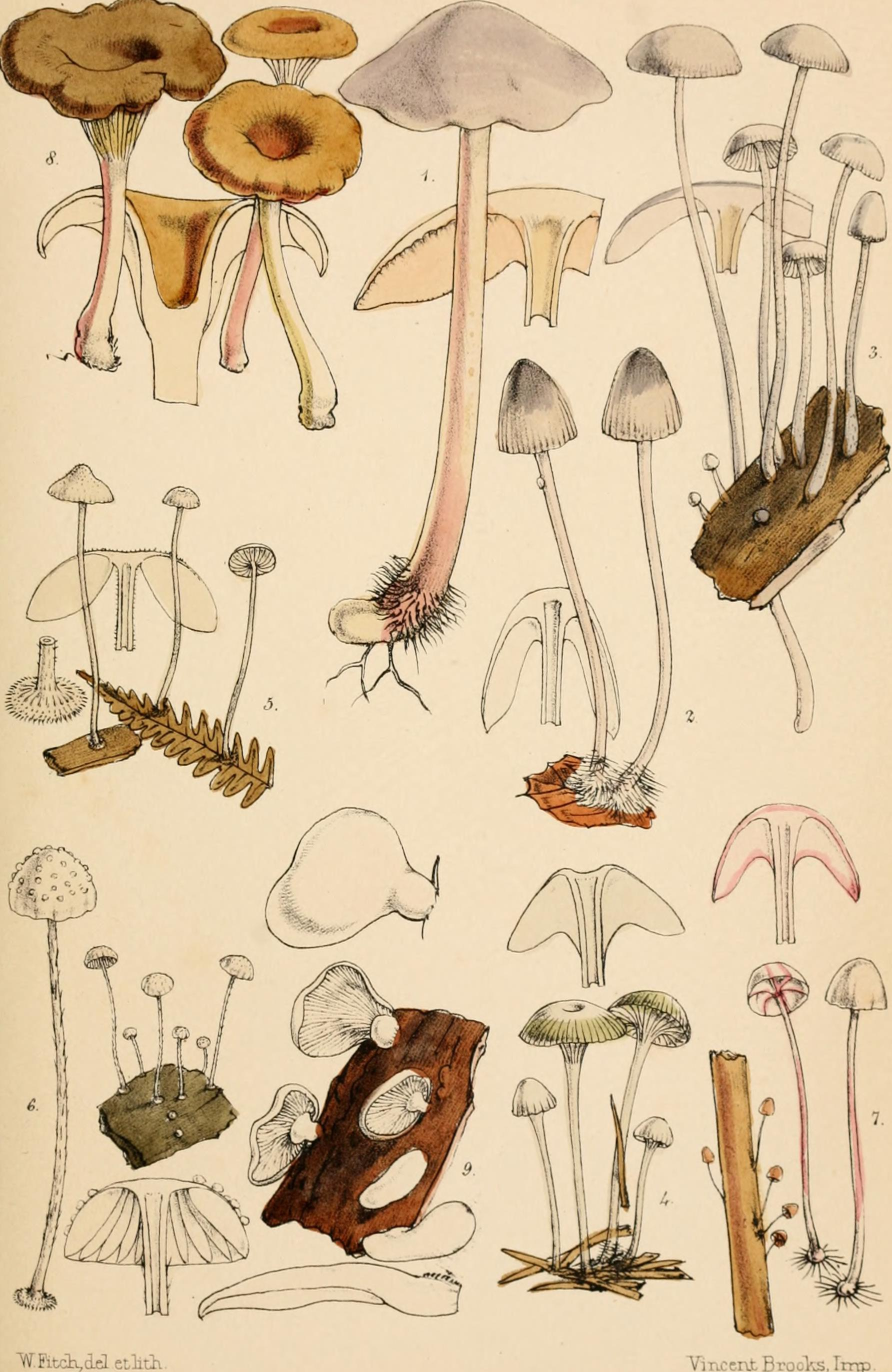
Illustrations of fungi commonly found in the British Isles

Forensic mycology is the use of mycology in criminal investigations. Mycology is used in estimating times of death or events by using known growth rates of fungi, in providing trace evidence, and in locating corpses. It also includes tracking mold growth in buildings, the use of fungi in biological warfare, and the use of psychotropic and toxic fungus varieties as illicit drugs or causes of death.

== Postmortem interval ==
The constant growth rate of fungi is used to determine post-mortem interval, and help investigators pinpoint time of death. Traditionally, medical examiners rely on body cooling, level of decomposition, and/or insect succession. Fungi have been noted to be present on dead bodies but, until recently, they were thought be little more than another organism aiding in decomposition. There is no limit to which species of fungi (or which parts of the body) can be used in this process, as long as conditions at the scene can be experimentally recreated.

H. van de Voorde and P. J. Van Dijck of the Catholic University of Leuven had the first noted use of recreating fungal growth to determine post-mortem interval in 1980. In this, a woman, living alone, was found dead in a temperature-controlled house with stab wounds in her chest and fungal growth on her face and lower abdomen. The body had already cooled to 12 °C, the ambient temperature, and showed no signs of insect colonization which made accurate post-mortem interval determination difficult. van de Voorde and Van Dijck recorded the size of the fungal growth on the eye and obtained a sample. This sample was incubated in similar conditions to the corpse and the time needed to grow the colony to the size on the body was used to determine port-mortem interval and, subsequently, the time of death, which was confirmed by the confession of the murderer. In addition to size, distinct phases of fungal growth can be used to aid in post-mortem determination. Chronologically, these include the formation of substrate mycelium, aerial mycelium development, sporulation, and post-sporulation color changes.

Multiple environmental factors, such as humidity and temperature, can affect the growth of these organisms, which should be taken into consideration when attempting to repeat conditions for comparative growth.

== Burial site location ==
The disposal of bodies, often in remote wooded areas, is often used to hide evidence critical to the investigational process. These shallow graves have high nutrient levels obtained from the decomposition of the body, making the surrounding soil high in nitrogen and other compounds attractive to fungal growth. These environments are ideal for postputrefaction and ammonia fungi to colonize and thus these mushrooms are a common indicator of a clandestine burial.

Ammonia fungi are common to environments with a high level of nitrogenous compounds. Studies have found that ammonia, the byproduct of the decomposition of these compounds, is vital for the fruiting of these types of fungi. When fungi are in close proximity to a burial, they are termed postputrefaction fungi. While there is considerable overlap between these two classifications, there are some species that do not fall into both categories. For example, Rhopalomyces strangulatus is found on or around carcasses but does not rely on ammonia for fruiting, while Coprinus echinosporus needs nitrogenous compounds but is found in environments with no remains. Fungi in these categories have only been reported in woodland ecosystems, notably in both mammalian and avian remains as well as in some wasps nests.

The geotropic nature of fungi also makes them an ideal indicator of gravesite disturbance. The stipe, commonly referred to as the 'stalk', always grows vertically while the pileus, or 'cap', grows horizontally. After being disturbed, these mushrooms will reorientate and can subsequently be used by investigators to determine movement of a crime scene.

== Trace evidence ==
Fungal spores and pollen are often used as mycological trace evidence. The transfer of these microscopic particles occurs upon contact between objects or persons, in conjunction with Locard's Exchange Principle. This falls into the subdiscipline of forensic palynology.

Fungal spores are similar to pollen spores as they can be traced back to a certain location, giving them probative value as trace evidence. They also have the distinct ability to grow in places where plants cannot, such as stone, leather, plastic, brick, and tiles, increasing the chances of finding microscopic fungal spores.

== Illicit and poisonous species ==
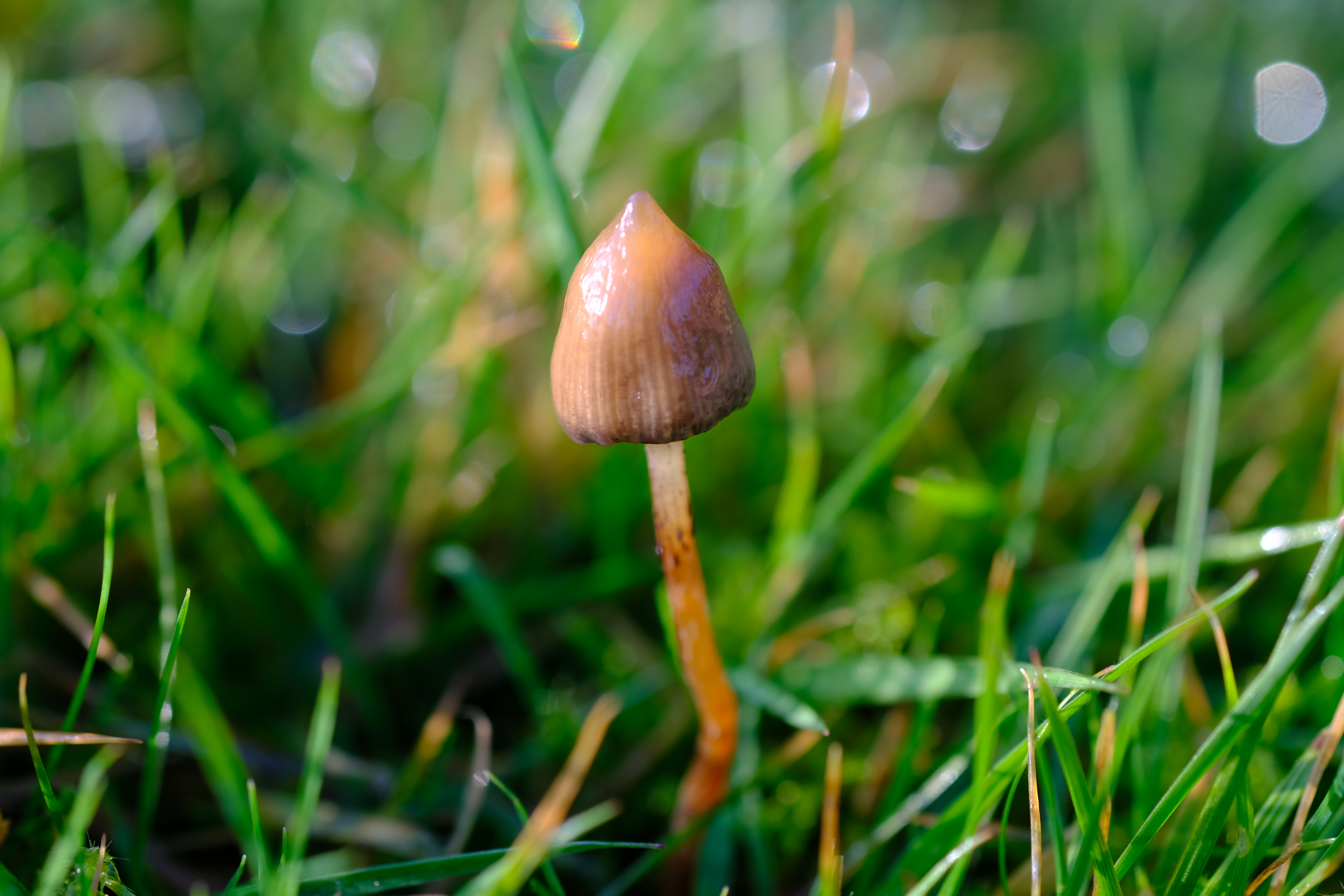
Psilocybe semilanceata (Liberty Cap), a common psilicybin-containing mushroom

Humans have a documented history of ingesting fungi, namely mushrooms, whether they be edible, psychoactive, or poisonous.

The onset and severity of symptoms after consumption of inedible species depends on the species, the person's tolerance, and the amount consumed. Symptoms can range from mild discomfort, to major gastric disorders and sometimes death. Symptoms may also initially seem similar to those produced by other medical conditions (e.g. cerebral infarction). Due to most fungi being consumed and processed though the digestive system, it is common to have cases of poisoning where no intact specimens remain and/or where digestion has already begun. If this is the case, examination of fungal remnants such as partially digested organisms or microscopic spores may be preformed in the stomach and intestinal contents. Further examination into the lower gut may be necessary in instances where the poisoning was slow acting and contents have already been digested.

Certain species of fungi also contain psychoactive qualities when ingested, these are known colloquially as 'magic mushrooms". These qualities come from substances derived from the fungi such as psilocybin, psilocin, and amanitin. The concentrations of psychoactive chemicals in these fungi vary, even within species, due to ecological and biological factors. As of the 1971 UN Convention, the possession and use of these substances and the fungi which they are derived from is strictly controlled, with psilocybin and psilocin being banned completely.

== Biological warfare ==
The use of fungi in bioterrorism dates back to 600 B.C., when the Assyrians used the rye ergot fungus (claviceps purpurea) to contaminate enemy wells. Currently, the fungi that have the greatest risk to the public are a specific set of molds that create a range of different mycotoxins, depending on the species. These toxins are most often present on food products, such as nuts, dried fruit, and grains. They can also occur in soil, decaying vegetation, and animal feed. Effects range from short-term severe illness to chronic conditions, with some resulting in death.

The greatest limitation to using these as a biological weapon is the difficulty of dispersal and human to human transmission. As of April 2022, The CDC currently does not currently list any fungal agents in their A or B categories for biological agents, which are reserved for pathogens presently at highest risk to society.

The WHO classifies multiple species as Risk Level 3 Pathogens, which have a high risk to those affected but do not easily transmit between people.

These species include:

- Blastomyces dermatitidis
- Cladophialophora bantiana
- Coccidioides immitis
- Coccidioides posadasii
- Histoplasma capsulatum
- Paracoccidioides brasiliensis
- Penicillium marneffei
- Rhinocladiella mackenziei

== Mold growth in buildings ==
Mold growth commonly occurs in damp, humid environments and is often found in buildings. These growths can affect those who are immunocompromised or have allergies to these organisms and should be investigated when a fungus-related death has occurred. Evidence of these growths can also be used in civil lawsuits or water damage insurance claims. Some common species found in buildings are Aspergillus glaucus, Aspergillus niger, Cladosporium cladosporioides, Cladosporium herbarum, and Stachybotrys chartarum.
