= Animal latrine =

Dedicated site where wild animals urinate and defecate

Animal latrines (latrine areas, animal toilets, defecation sites) are places where wildlife animals habitually defecate and urinate. Many kinds of animals are highly specific in this respect and have stereotyped routines, including approach and departure. Many of them have communal, i.e., shared, latrines.

A regularly used toilet area or dunghill, created by many mammals, such as moles or hyraxes, is also called a midden.

== Animals with dedicated defecation sites ==
Animals with communal latrines include raccoons, Eurasian badgers, elephants, deer, antelopes, horses, and (prehistorically) dicynodonts (a 240-million-year-old site was called the "world's oldest public toilet").

Some lizards, such as yakka skinks (Egernia rugosa) and thorny devils use dedicated defecation sites.

European rabbits may deposit their pellets both randomly over the range and at communal latrine sites.

== Function and impact ==
=== Territoriality ===
Middens and other types of defecation sites may serve as territorial markers. Elaborate "dungpile rituals" are reported for adult stallions, and deer bucks, which are thought to serve for confrontation avoidance. In contrast, female and young animals exhibit no such behavior.

=== Sanitation ===
Dedicated defecation sites are thought to be the result of sanitation-driven behavior. For example, the spider mite Stigmaeopsis miscanthi constructs woven nests, and nest members defecate at only one site inside the nest. Dedicated latrine areas observed by free-roaming horses mean that grazing area is kept parasite-free. Even stabled horses seem to have vestiges of such behavior.

Herbivoral livestock is at risk of parasite/pathogen exposure from feces during grazing, therefore there is an interest in research of livestock behavior in the presence of feces both of their own species, and others, including wildlife, including the dependence on defecation patterns.

=== Ecological impact ===
Latrines of herbivores, such as antelopes, play an important role in ecology by providing enrichment of certain areas in nutrients. It is described that duiker and steenbok antelopes tended to defecate in exposed sites, generally on very sandy soil, while klipspringer preferred rocky outcrops, thus enriching the nutrient-deficient areas, as well as depositing plant seed there.

=== Raccoon latrines ===
A common nuisance of raccoons is raccoon latrines (raccoon toilets), which may contain eggs of the roundworm Baylisascaris procyonis. Nuisance raccoon latrines may be found in attics, on flat roofs, on logs, in yards and sandboxes, etc.

== Use in research ==
In addition to immediate research of animal behavior and biology, animal toilets and coprolites are an instrument of research for not directly related purposes in biology, ecology, paleontology climate research, and other areas. They provide various information: plant habitats, historical information about prehistoric life and climate, etc.

== Animal latrine associates ==
Some fungi are animal latrine associates. For example, Hebeloma radicosum is an ammonia fungus which associates with latrines of moles, wood mice, and shrews.

There is a curious association of Cucumis humifructus ("aardvark cucumber" or "aardvark pumpkin") with latrines of aardvarks. C. humifructus produces its fruit underground, the aardvark burrows for them, and then deposits its seeds in dunghills near its habitat. The distribution of C. humifructus tends to match that of aardvark latrines.

Some insects (e.g., termites and dung beetles) feed on animal excrement and hence are natural associates of dung sites.
