= Hebeloma radicosoides =

Scientific classification
- Domain: Eukaryota
- Kingdom: Fungi
- Division: Basidiomycota
- Class: Agaricomycetes
- Order: Agaricales
- Family: Hymenogastraceae
- Genus: Hebeloma
- Species: H. radicosoides

Binomial name
- Hebeloma radicosoides Sagara, Hongo & Y.Murak. (2000)

Species of fungus

Hebeloma radicosoides is a species of agaric fungus in the family Hymenogastraceae. Found in Japan, it was described as new to science in 2000.

The mushroom's long rooting stipe and membranous ring give it an appearance similar to H. radicosum. Like that species, it is also an ammonia fungus, growing on soil containing urea.

== See also ==
- List of Hebeloma species
