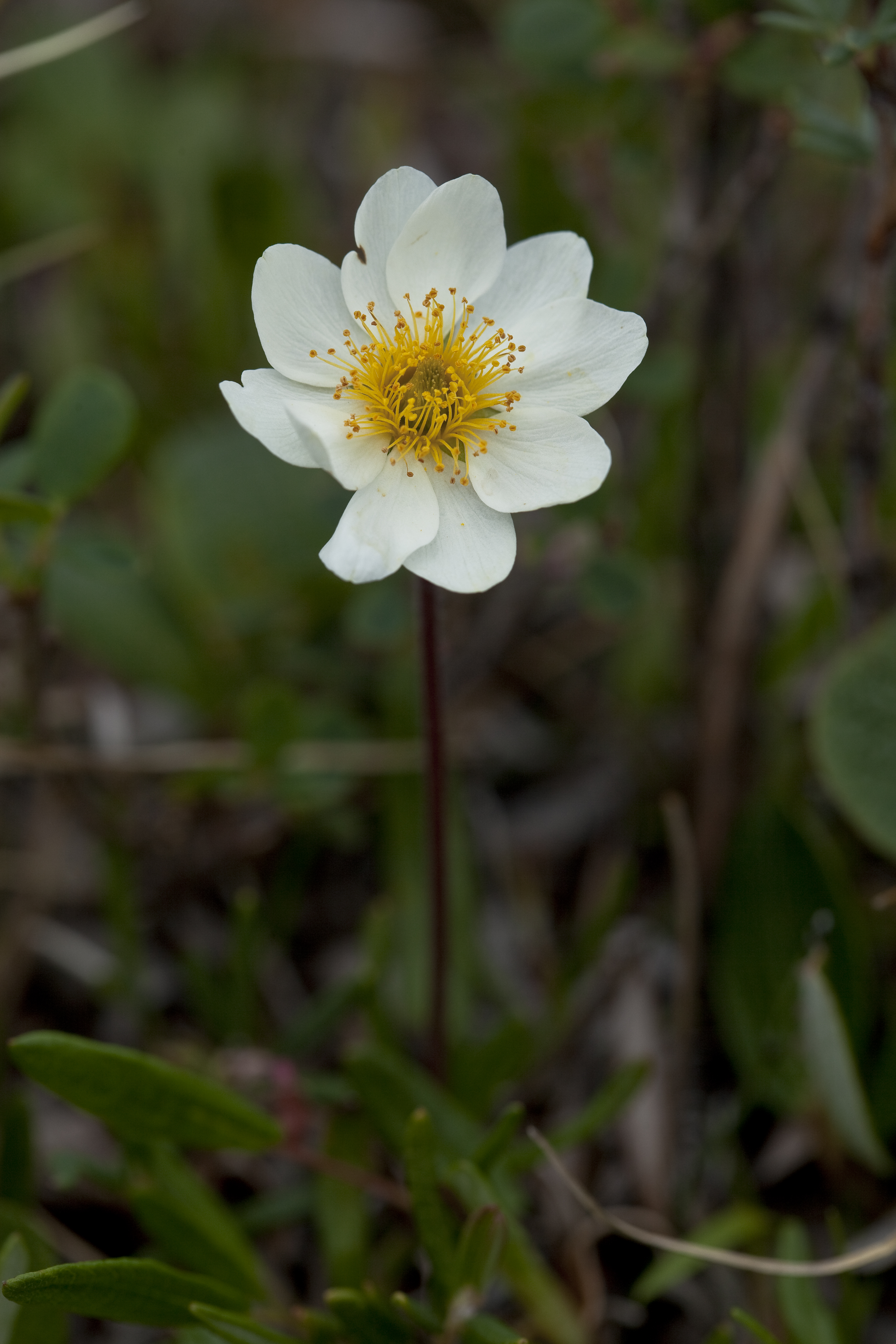

Conservation status
- Secure (NatureServe)

Scientific classification
- Kingdom: Plantae
- Clade: Tracheophytes
- Clade: Angiosperms
- Clade: Eudicots
- Clade: Rosids
- Order: Rosales
- Family: Rosaceae
- Genus: Dryas
- Species: D. integrifolia

Binomial name
- Dryas integrifolia Vahl
- The distribution of Dryas integrifolia

Synonyms
- Dryas chamissonis Spreng. ex Juz.; Dryas crenulata Juz.; Dryas integrifolia f. canescens (Simmons) Fernald; Dryas integrifolia var. canescens Simmons; Dryas integrifolia var. minuta Kozhevn.; Dryas integrifolia var. subintegrifolia Hultén; Dryas octopetala subsp. integrifolia (Vahl) Hartz; Dryas sylvatica (Hultén) A.E.Porsild; Dryas tenella Pursh

= Dryas integrifolia =

Species of flowering plant

Dryas integrifolia is a species of flowering plant in the rose family known by the common names arctic avens, entireleaf mountain-avens, white mountain-avens, northern white mountain avens, and mountain avens. It is native to northern parts of North America, where it occurs from Alaska across Canada to Greenland. It is a common species of the Arctic and it is probably the most common flowering plant on some of the western Arctic islands.

This plant is a shrub, often a dwarf shrub. It forms a prostrate mat up to 10 cm (3.9 in) to 17 cm (6.7 in) tall, the stems branching horizontally along the ground. The leaves are borne on stipulate petioles that are covered in long, silky or woolly hairs. The leaf blades are linear to lance-shaped and measure up to 2.2 cm (0.87 in) long. The blades have smooth upper surfaces and densely haired undersides. The flowering stem (peduncle) has no leaves on it but is covered in long woolly hairs. It bears a single flower with up to 11 obovate petals which are usually white but may be shades of yellow or cream. In the middle are many stamens tipped with yellow anthers. The styles start small and enlarge as the attached fruits mature, becoming up to 2.5 cm (0.98 in) long and sporting a plumelike coat of long, fluffy hairs. These plumes tangle together, and clumps of fruits fall away from the plant to be borne away on the wind. The fruit is an achene.

Some flowers exhibit heliotropism, changing orientation to follow the sun. Others grow toward the position of the sun at noon. As the flower faces the sun it provides a resting spot for a variety of insects, being slightly warmer than surrounding surfaces. Additionally, character expression of the various adjacent floral organs has been seen to demonstrate atavistic character convergence, such that petals may bear the yellow mark of anthers, or a greenish midrib, as sepals do.

This species is actinorhizal, able to live in symbiosis with nitrogen-fixing bacteria. It can also form a symbiosis with the mushroom Hebeloma cylindrosporum via an ectomycorrhiza.

This plant is common in many Arctic regions, growing in several types of cold, wet habitat. It can be found in tundra, meadows, river valleys, and scree slopes. It anchors well in rocky and gravelly substrates, and it thrives in soils with low organic content. It is a pioneer species in rough terrain. It likely colonized wide areas of the Arctic as ice sheets receded. This species dominates several Arctic habitat types, being the first plant to take hold in the scoured substrate and becoming the most abundant species in the area. It dominates a dwarf heath plant community along with sedges such as Carex rupestris in Montana. In parts of northern Alaska it codominates bare, cryoturbated soils with the lichen Ochrolechia frigida, and moist coastal flats with Carex aquatilis, a sedge.

The plant's ability to colonize denuded Arctic landscapes makes it a useful tool in revegetation efforts, particularly in habitat altered by mining. Once the plant takes hold, its dense, matlike form tends to accumulate organic matter. Increasing the organic cover in a barren mining zone is considered an important goal in revegetation efforts.

The Inuit have many names for the species, including malikkaat, isuqtannguat, isurramuat, and piluit. They monitored the status of the plant in order to track the seasons.
