= Hebeloma vinosophyllum =

Scientific classification
- Domain: Eukaryota
- Kingdom: Fungi
- Division: Basidiomycota
- Class: Agaricomycetes
- Order: Agaricales
- Family: Hymenogastraceae
- Genus: Hebeloma
- Species: H. vinosophyllum

Binomial name
- Hebeloma vinosophyllum Hongo (1965)

Species of fungus

Hebeloma vinosophyllum is a toxic species of agaric fungus in the family Hymenogastraceae. The species was described by Japanese mycologist Tsuguo Hongo in 1965. It was recorded from Vietnamese Pinus kesiya forests in 2014, its first record in Southeast Asia.

An ammonia fungus, it tends to grow on the corpses of animals. It contains eleven poisonous compounds collectively known as hebevinosides.

== See also ==
- List of Hebeloma species
