= Coprinopsis neophlyctidospora =

Scientific classification
- Domain: Eukaryota
- Kingdom: Fungi
- Division: Basidiomycota
- Class: Agaricomycetes
- Order: Agaricales
- Family: Psathyrellaceae
- Genus: Coprinopsis
- Species: C. neophlyctidospora

Binomial name
- Coprinopsis neophlyctidospora Raut, Fukiharu & A.Suzuki (2011)

Species of fungus

Coprinopsis neophlyctidospora is a species of mushroom-forming fungus in the family Psathyrellaceae. It was described as new to science in 2011 by Jay Raut, Toshimitsu Fukiharu, and Akira Suzuki. An ammonia fungus, the species is known only from the boreal forest region of Alberta, Canada, where it was found growing on urea-treated soil. The specific epithet neophlyctidospora alludes to its distribution in the New World (neo) and its close resemblance to Coprinellus phlyctidospora.

== See also ==
- List of Coprinopsis species
