= Ammonia fungi =

Fungi that grow quickly in the presence of ammonia

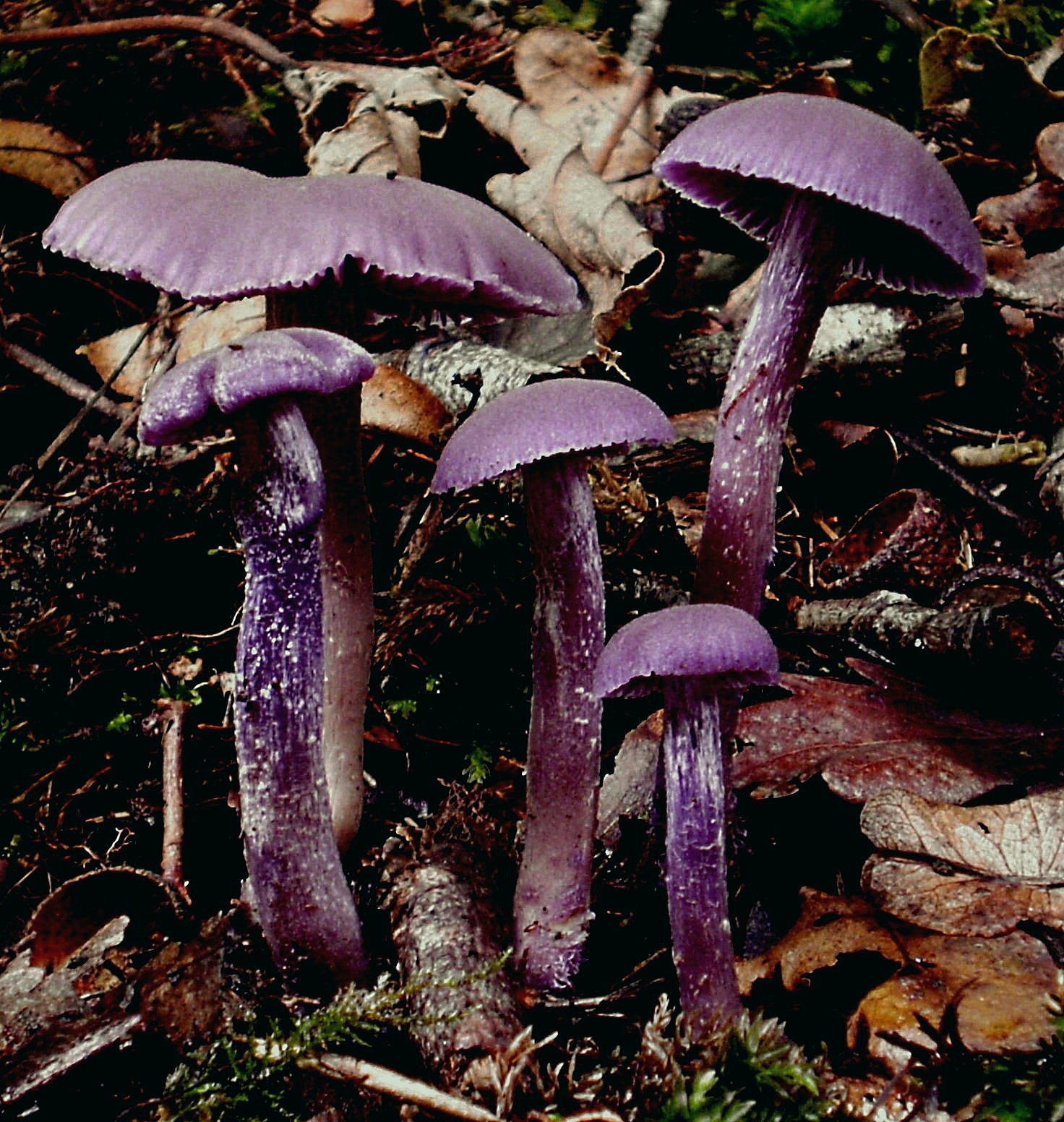
Laccaria amethystina, one of many types of ammonia fungi

Ammonia fungi are characterized by the rapid development and high germination rates of fruiting bodies in the presence of ammonia or other nitrogen-containing materials with alkaline soil conditions. These fungi naturally occur after decomposition events like animal excretion or death. Reproduction can be classified into two categories including early and late phase ammonia fungi. The addition of high amounts of ammonia, urea, or other nitrogen-containing materials can cause ideal soil conditions that the ammonia fungi thrive in and then revert to pre-application conditions. Ammonia fungi that develop sporophores after applications of nitrogen-containing materials are currently being studied in the field and laboratory for their mechanisms of colonization, establishment, and occurrence of fruiting bodies.

== Evolution ==
Fungi naturally need essential bioelements including nitrogen, phosphorus, iron, and other trace elements that would otherwise limit their growth. However, it is believed that the evolution of each species of ammonium transporters/ammonia permeases may have developed in a unique manner. One theory suggests the convergent evolution of nitrate assimilation cluster in green algae could have had a general selective advantage toward nitrate assimilation genes. Fungi may also have a mutualistic relationship towards the surrounding plants in which nitrogen is taken up by the plant in the form of ammonium through a protein transporter of fungal origin, leading to a relationship between plant and fungi. A symbiotic relationship between the arbuscular mycorrhizal fungi networks and plant roots may exist through the provision of nitrogen and phosphate. Evolution for species of ammonia fungi should be treated individually and generalizations may be hard to make for the whole category.

== Environment ==
Ammonia fungi are typically found in temperate forested areas but have been documented in field environments. This is largely dependent on the species of ammonia fungi being referred to but environments with well-rotted wood and plant debris are preferred by many species. Many species prefer to occupy dung including Peziza moravecii, Amblyosporium botrytiis, and Chaetomium globosum. Coprinopsis stercorea specifically grows solely on the dung of sheep, goats, and donkeys. Chaetomium globosum also reside on plants, soils, and straw in forested and mountain soils across a variety of biomes. Coprinopsis echinospora have been found on cotton clothing during decomposition research. Collybia cookei can be found on the decomposing remains of other mushrooms. Hebelome vinosophyllum can be found growing on the remains of animals in Vietnamese forests in Southeast Asia. Most species prefer woodland with nutrient-enriched nitrogen-treated soils.

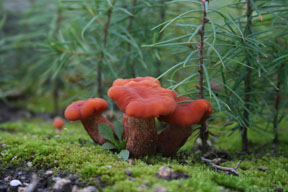
Laccaria bicolor, a type of ammonia fungi found in temperate forests in North America and Northern Europe that is also carnivorous

Species not only have preferences for sites but also more general locations in which to be found. Ascobolus denudatus can be found in Europe. Coprinopsis neophlyctidospora is new to science and has only been found in the boreal forests of Alberta, Canada. Coprinopsis phlyctidospora can be found in the Netherlands, Japan, New Zealand, and Australia. Crucispora rhombisperma has recently been discovered in Taiwan. Laccaria amethystina is mainly found in Northern temperate zones, in deciduous and coniferous forests, though it has been found in Central and South America as well. Anamika lactariolens can be found in China. Hebeloma radicosum can be found in Japan, Europe, and North America. Laccaria bicolor is found in temperate forests in North America and Northern Europe.

=== Symbiotic relationships ===
Ammonia fungi contribute to the nitrogen cycle and play a significant role in maintaining it. This in turn helps soil bacteria, microbes, and the overall soil structure. The relationship between plant roots and mycorrhizal networks can fix nitrogen in the soil and provide symbiosis to other species such as leaf-cutter ants and termites. Ammonia fungi can also be symbiotes on larger scales with people, animals, and plants. Laccaria amethystina and L. bicolor are edible, but may not be considered choice. Coprinopsis cinera is edible when eaten directly after collecting. Ammonia fungi may also contribute to the ecosystem in other ways being more predatory than mutualistic. Laccaria bicolor is a species of carnivorous fungi, that will catch and kill springtails. Ammonia fungi also contribute to the denitrification of soils and reduce greenhouse gas emissions as well, making a symbiotic relationship with many more species and the soil itself.

=== Soil conditions ===
The addition of ammonia or urea causes numerous chemical and biological changes, for example, the pH of soil litter is increased to 8–10 and the high alkaline conditions interrupts the process of nutrient recycling. Water content in soil increases after the application of urea or ammonia and then decreases after the development of early phase fungi. This usually takes about 6 months after a substantial addition of ammonia. Ammonia concentrations in the soil take up to 2 years to return to pre-application levels of ammonia with the assistance of the second round of late phase fungi. Ammonia fungi are most active in the O horizon of soil followed by the A and B horizons.

== Reproduction ==
After ammonia application in forest soils, fungi can be classified into early phase ammonia fungi and late phase ammonia fungi depending on when they develop their fruiting bodies. Ammonia fungi develop in a specific order starting with anamorphic fungi, cup fungi (Ascomycota), and agaric fungi with small basidiomata. These fungi are considered early phase (EP) ammonia fungi. After the development of these fungi, argaric fungi with larger basidiomata develop and are classified as late phase (LP) ammonia fungi. These fungi reproduction cycles can be difficult to replicate in laboratory settings. In the field, successful reproduction cycles come with the colonization of the fungus and ability to produce its reproductive structures.

=== Early phase ammonia fungi ===
Early phase (EP) ammonia fungi include anamorphic fungi, ascomycota, and smaller basidiomycota. These species occupy alkaline to neutral soils that have higher ammonium-nitrogen concentrations. This is due to either a preference or tolerance to the high concentrations of ammonium. They are also saprotrophic. EP ammonia fungi typically only occur in one cycle. Anamorphic fungi develop first, being able to handle pH conditions above 8. Once they are able to reduce the pH to 7, ascomycota fungi develop. After the ascomycota fungi reduce the pH to 6, the smaller basidiomycota develop. This is considered the late part of early phase ammonia fungi. EP fungi can develop anywhere from 20 to 200 days after the application of urea.

=== Late phase ammonia fungi ===
Once the pH is in the range of 3.5–6.0 the late phase ammonia fungi, larger basidiomata, will develop, occupying weaker acidic conditions. Anything that develops after this group of fungi will also be considered a LP ammonia fungus. These species are typically present 2–3 years after urea and ammonium applications. LP fungi use ammonium within the soil to develop and begin to turn it into nitrate-nitrogen gradually over time. Quantity and size of LP fungi are typically larger than EP fungi. LP ammonia fungi can occur over multiple cycles and typically last longer than EP fungi. This is based on the species composition and dominance, along with treatment of urea and time of the year. LP fungi are biotrophic with few being saprobic.

== Conservation efforts ==
Propagation techniques are being developed in order to better understand Ammonia fungi and how they function within ammonium heavy sites. This however is difficult due to numerous abiotic and biotic factors including interactions between ammonia fungi species, interactions with the agar media, and spore longevity. Germination can also be difficult in laboratory settings. Addressing the increasing threat to habitat for ammonia fungi is necessary through these methods to be able to better protect it. This includes not only conservation of the forests in which these fungi can be found but also soil conservation efforts too. Overall, protection of habitat for rare ammonia fungi will be necessary to protecting species in the long run. More research must also be done on fungi in general to discover more species of ammonia fungi and create better conservation management strategies for the fungi that are currently being threatened by human activity or under additional environmental stressors and threats.

=== Threats ===
Ammonia fungi are threatened by the same threats that most fungi experience including mining operations, deforestation, invasive agricultural practices, and land and air pollution. Air pollution in particular can damage mycorrhizal structures. Decomposition of excessive ammonia in the atmosphere may actually cause harm to fine mycorrhizal structures.

== Further research ==
Little is known about many species of ammonia fungi, with new fungi being discovered often. It is necessary to research ammonia fungi given their role in the nitrogen cycle and the role they play in soil conservation. There is also little information about the interactions between ammonia fungi and non-ammonia fungi, leading to gaps in literature which could help us to understand fungi in general. It will be necessary to continue researching ammonia fungi to begin to bridge some of the gaps that currently exist in this field.

== Species ==
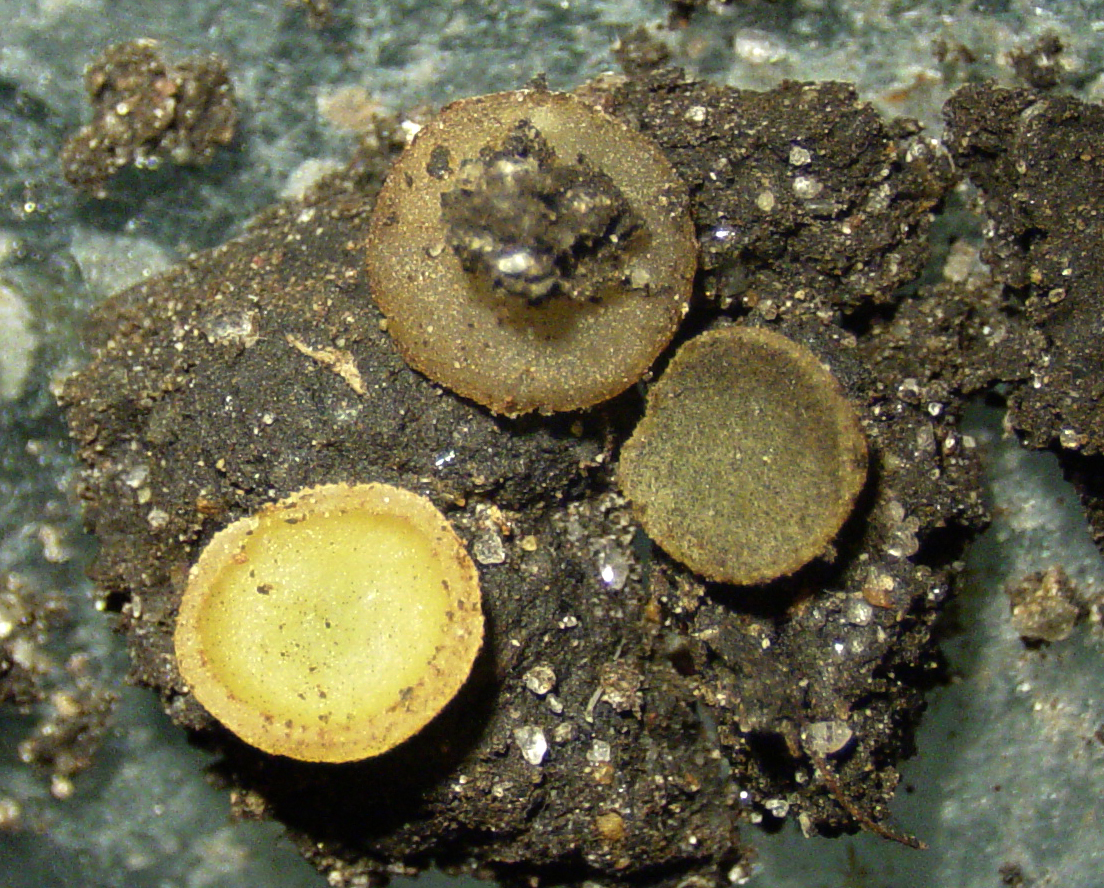
Ascobolus denudatus, one type of Ascomycota fungi

- Anamorphic fungi
  - Amblyosporium botrytis
  - Cladorrhinum foescundissimum
  - Doratomyces purpureofuscus
- Ascomycota
  - Ascobolus denudatus
  - Chaetomium globosum
  - Psuedombrophila petrakii
  - Peziza moravecii
  - Humaria velonovskyi
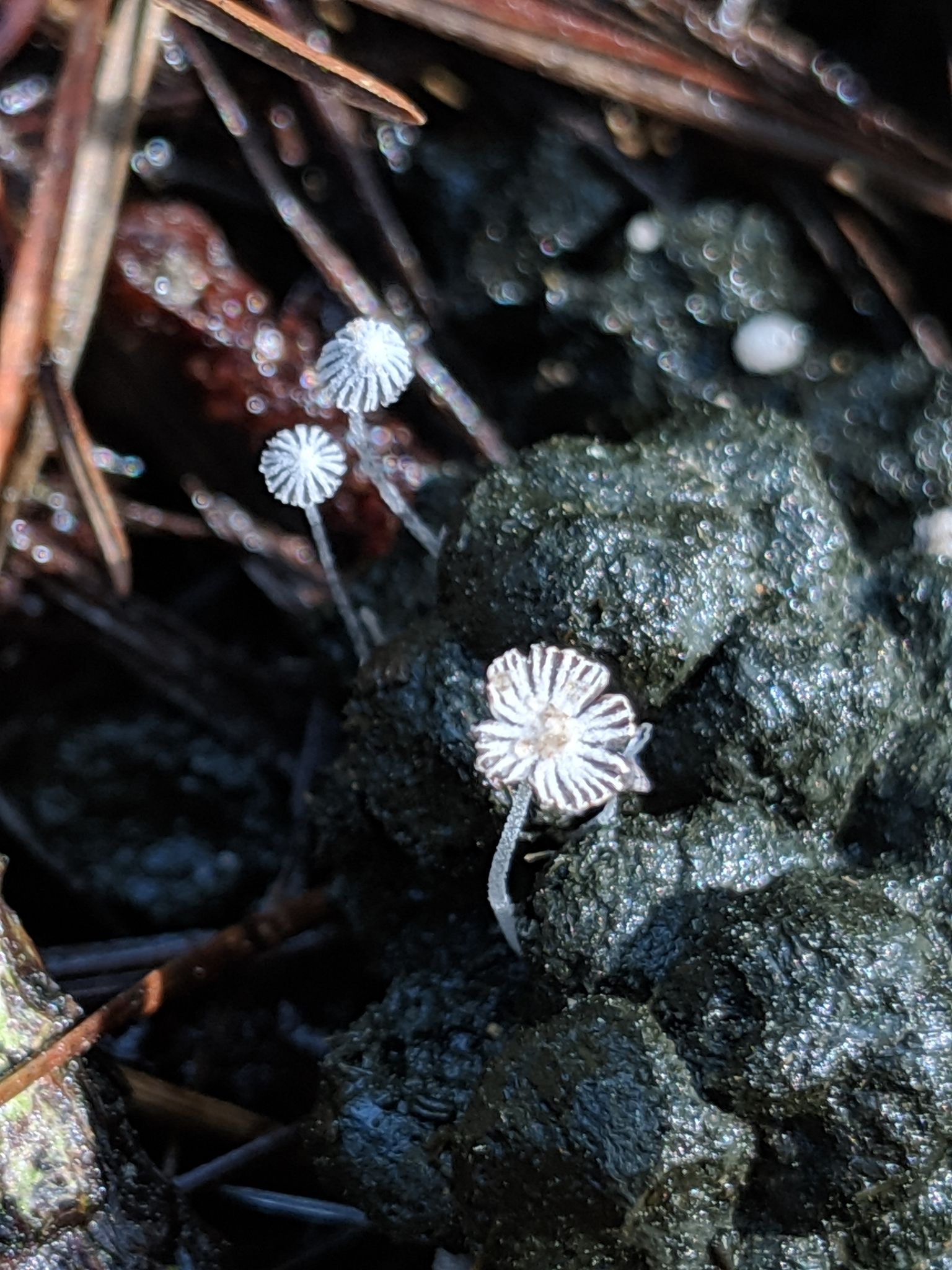
    Coprinopsis stercorea, one type of Basidiomycota fungi
- Basidiomycota
  - Coprinopsis cinera
  - Coprinopsis echinospora
  - Coprinopsis neolagopus
  - Coprinopsis neophlyctidospora
  - Coprinopsis phlycitdospora
  - Coprinopsis stercorea
  - Crucispora rhombisperma
  - Laccaria amethystina
  - Lyophyllum tylicolor
  - Sagaranella tylicolor
- Late Successional Phase
  - Collybia cookei
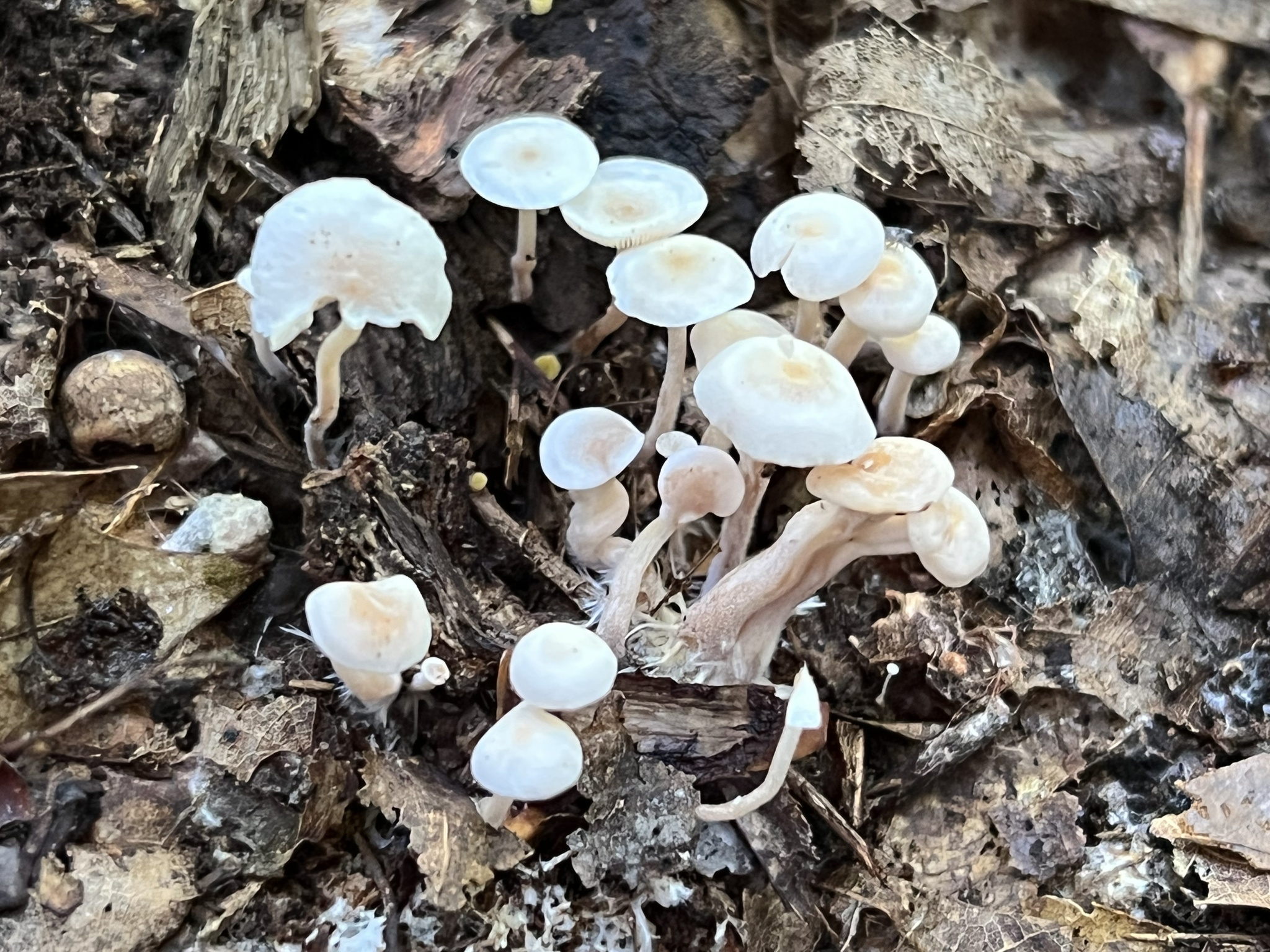
  - Collybia cookei, one type of Late Successional Phase fungi
    Anamika lactariolens
  - Calocybe leucocephela
  - Hebeloma luchuense
  - Hebeloma radicosum
  - Hebeloma spoliatum
  - Hebelome vinosophyllum
  - Laccaria bicolor
