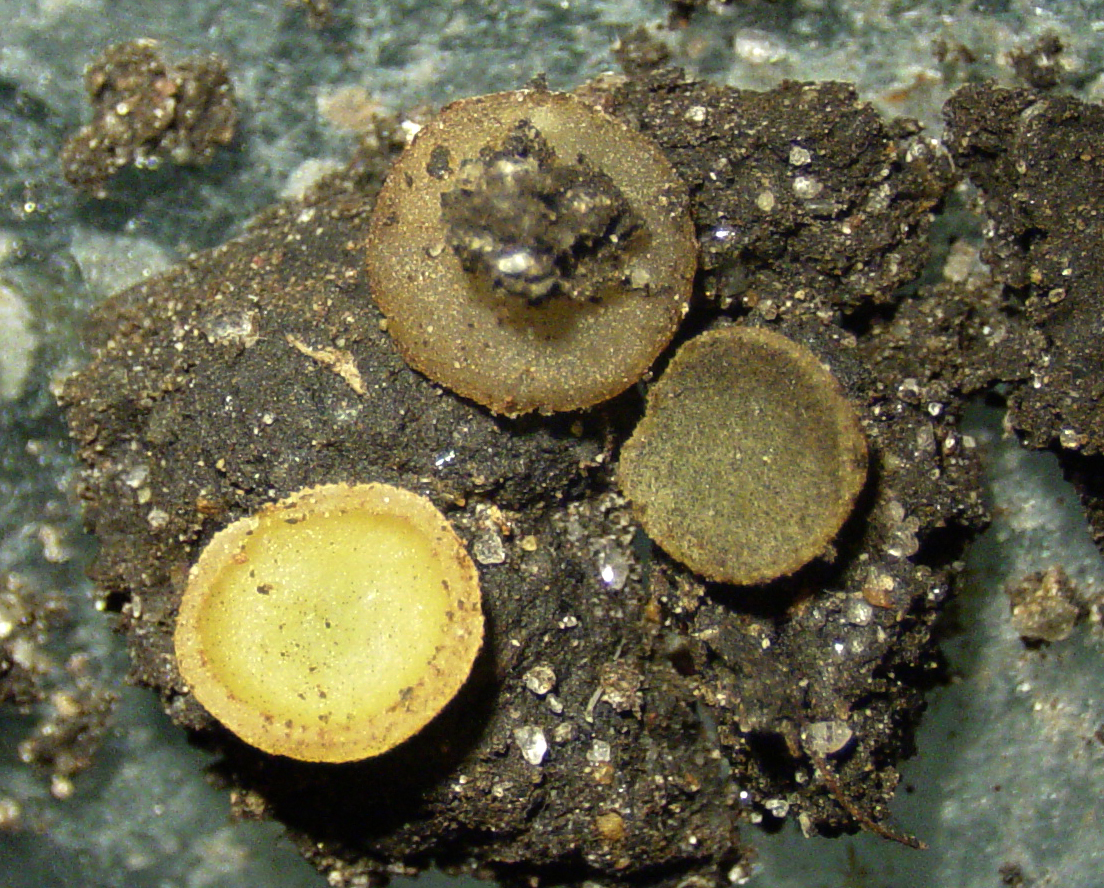

Scientific classification
- Domain: Eukaryota
- Kingdom: Fungi
- Division: Ascomycota
- Class: Pezizomycetes
- Order: Pezizales
- Family: Ascobolaceae
- Genus: Ascobolus
- Species: A. denudatus

Binomial name
- Ascobolus denudatus Fr., 1822

= Ascobolus denudatus =

Species of fungus

Ascobolus denudatus is a species of apothecial fungus belonging to the family Ascobolaceae.

This is an uncommon European species appearing as tiny yellow discs up to 1 mm across on rotting straw. It can be encountered at any time of year but is mainly seen from summer to early autumn.
