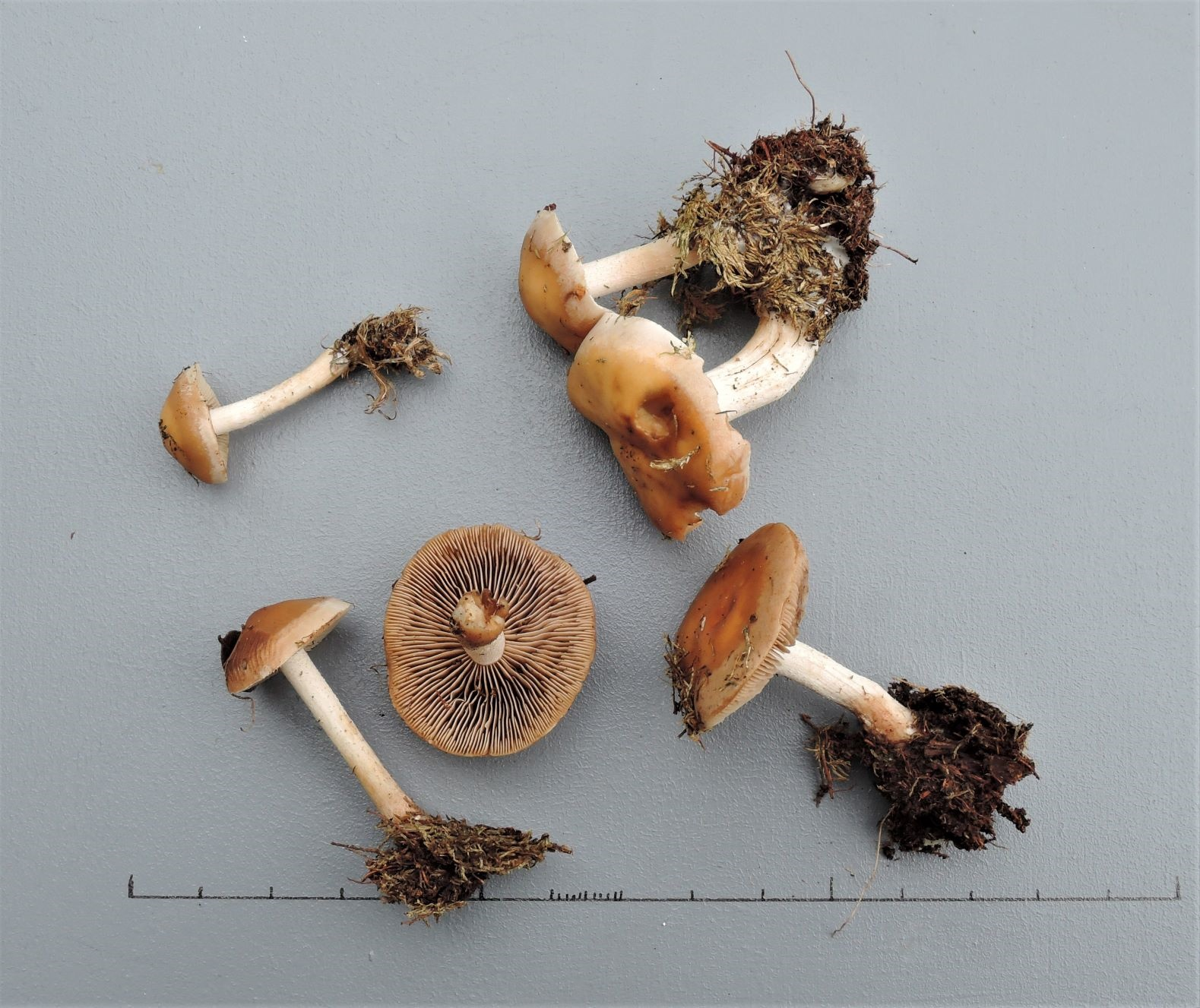

Scientific classification
- Domain: Eukaryota
- Kingdom: Fungi
- Division: Basidiomycota
- Class: Agaricomycetes
- Order: Agaricales
- Family: Hymenogastraceae
- Genus: Hebeloma
- Species: H. birrus

Binomial name
- Hebeloma birrus (Fr.) Gillet

= Hebeloma birrus =

Species of fungus

Hebeloma birrus is a species of mushroom in the family Hymenogastraceae.
