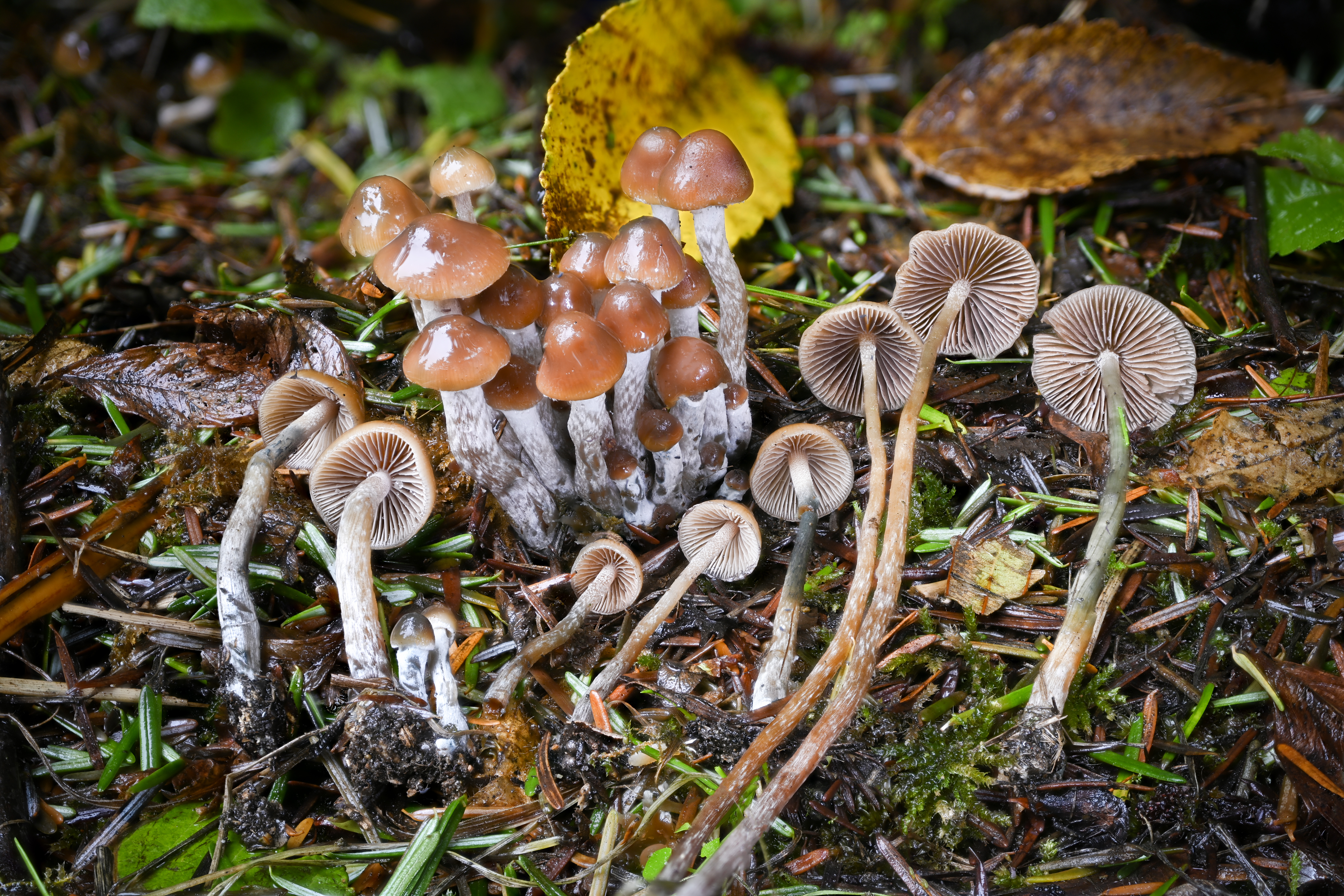

Scientific classification
- Domain: Eukaryota
- Kingdom: Fungi
- Division: Basidiomycota
- Class: Agaricomycetes
- Order: Agaricales
- Family: Hymenogastraceae
- Genus: Psilocybe
- Species: P. pelliculosa

Binomial name
- Psilocybe pelliculosa (A.H.Sm.) Singer & A.H.Sm. (1958)

Synonyms
- Psathyra pelliculosa A.H.Sm. (1937)

= Psilocybe pelliculosa =

Species of fungus

Psilocybe pelliculosa Mycological characteristics
- Gills on hymenium
- Cap is conical or campanulate
- Hymenium is adnate or seceding
- Stipe is bare
- Spore print is purple-brown
- Ecology is saprotrophic
- Edibility is psychoactive

Psilocybe pelliculosa is a species of fungus in the family Hymenogastraceae. The fruit bodies, or mushrooms, have a conical brownish cap up to 2 cm (3/4 in) in diameter atop a slender stem up to 8 cm (3 1/8 in) long. It has a white partial veil that does not leave a ring on the stem. American mycologist Alexander H. Smith first described the species in 1937 as a member of the genus known today as Psathyrella; it was transferred to Psilocybe by Rolf Singer in 1958.

Psilocybe pelliculosa is found in the Pacific Northwest region of the United States and Canada, where it grows on the ground in groups or clusters along trails or forest roads in coniferous woods. A single collection has also been reported from Finland, and also in Norway. The mushrooms contain the psychedelic compounds psilocybin and baeocystin, although at relatively low concentrations. Several mushroom species that are similar in appearance to P. pelliculosa can be distinguished by subtle differences in the form of the fruit body, or by microscopic characteristics.

== Taxonomy ==
The species was first described scientifically by Alexander H. Smith in 1937 as Psathyra pelliculosa, (Note: Depending on the authority consulted, the taxon Psathyra is considered either a subgenus of Psathyrella, or synonymous with Psathyrella.) based on specimens he collected in Washington and Oregon. The type specimen was collected near Tahkenitch Lake, Oregon, in November 1935. In a 1941 publication, Smith revised his opinion, and considered the species to be the same as Hypholoma silvatica (later Psilocybe silvatica), as he thought that the slight differences between the two were of no taxonomic significance. After reevaluating these two species in addition to several others closely related, Rolf Singer and Smith later reestablished the taxon and transferred it to Psilocybe in 1958. Psilocybe authority Gastón Guzmán classified the species in the section Semilanceatae, a grouping of related species characterized by having roughly ellipsoid, usually thick-walled spores, and lacking pleurocystidia.

The specific epithet pelliculosa is derived from the Latin pellicula, meaning "film", and refers to the gelatinous pellicle of the cap. The mushroom is commonly known as the "conifer Psilocybe" or the "striate Psilocybe".

== Description ==
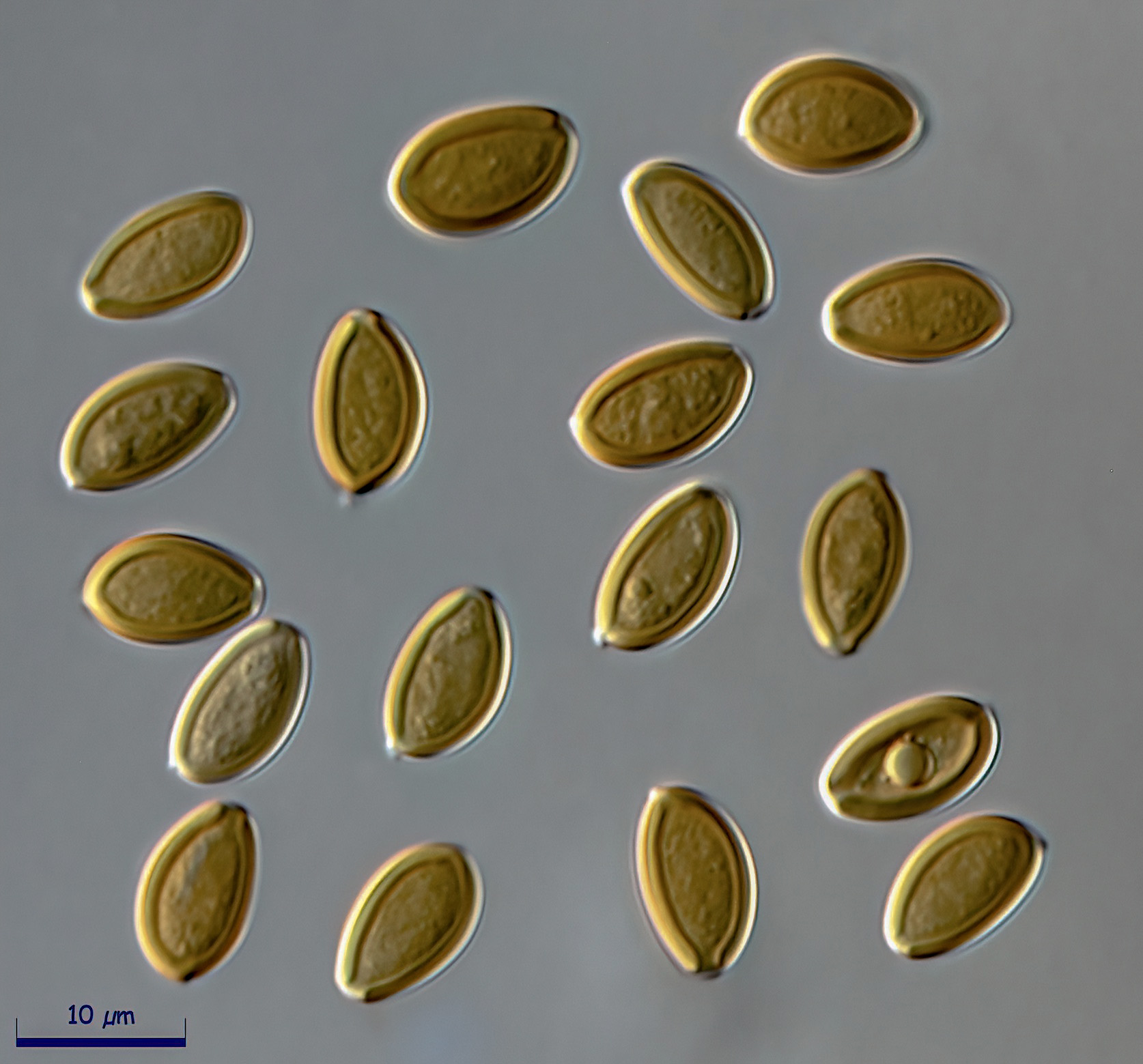
Spores are ellipsoid with an apical germ pore; top: light microscopy; middle: scanning electron microscopy : Gill edge 1000x with cheilocystidia bottom

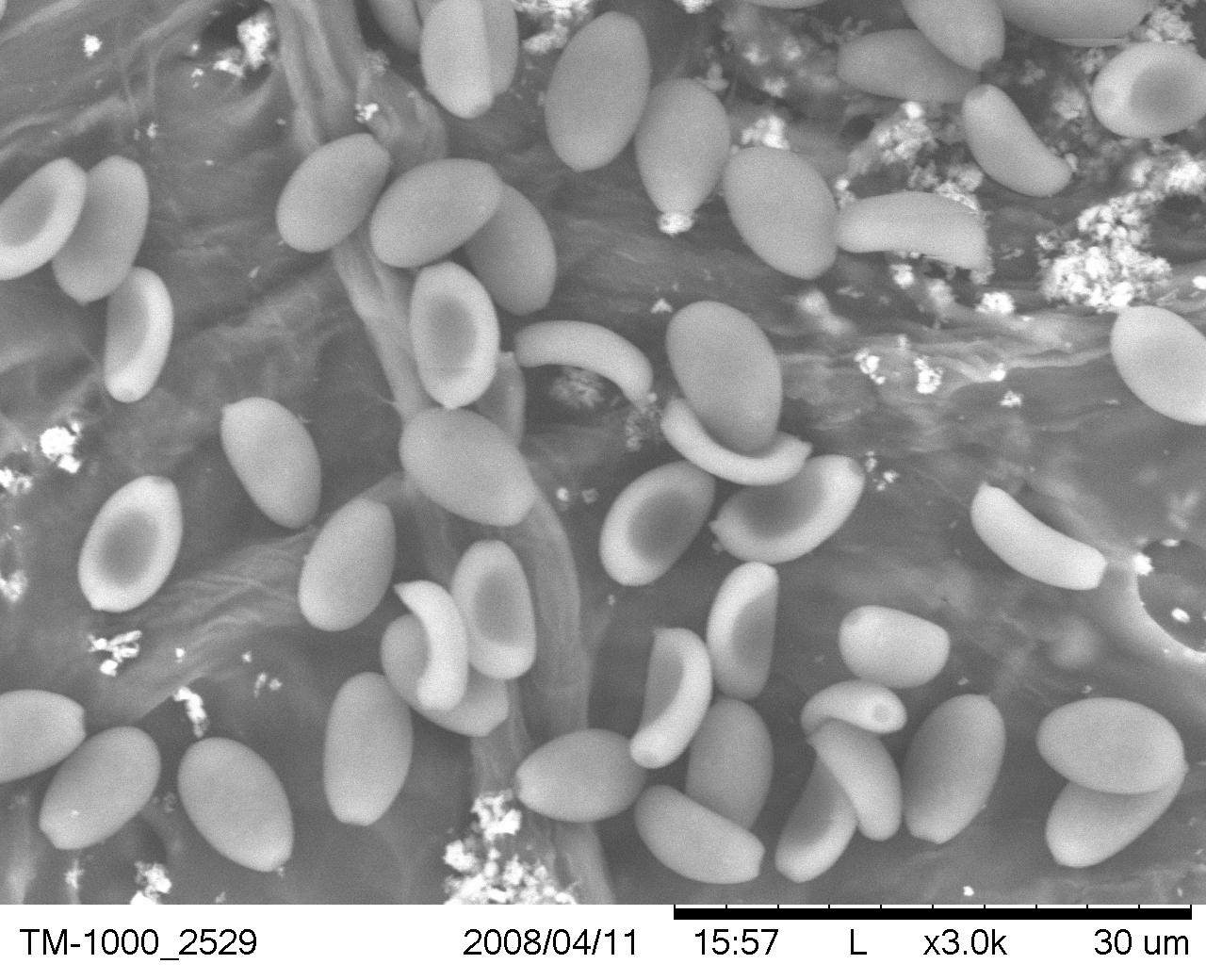
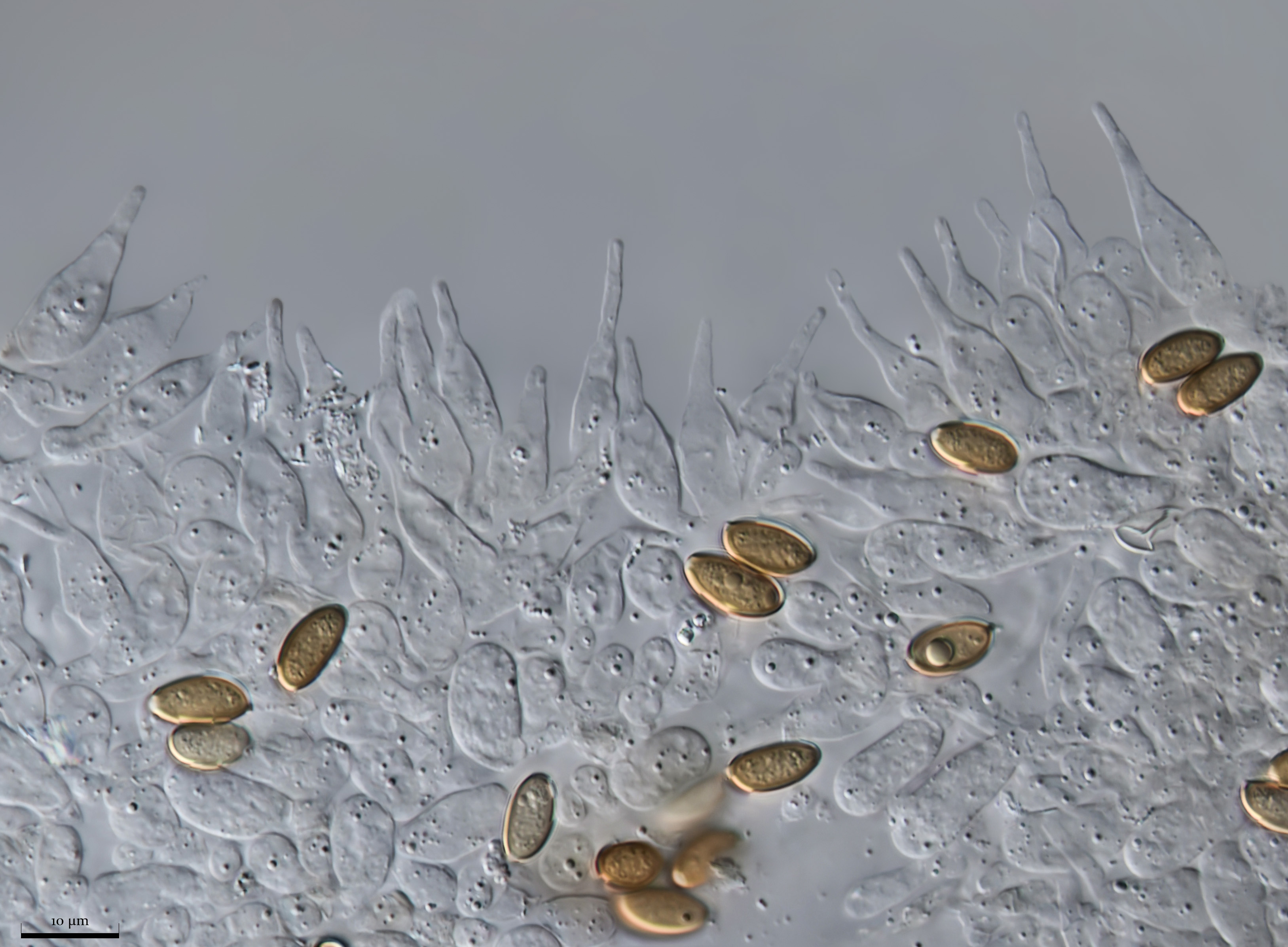

The cap of P. pelliculosa is initially sharply cone-shaped, and expands slightly over time to become broadly bell-shaped, but it never expands to become completely flat. The cap margin is pressed against the stem initially, and for a short time is appendiculate (has partial veil fragments hanging from the margin). The caps of mature specimens are smooth, sticky, and have translucent radial striations that reach dimensions of 0.8 to 2 cm (3/8 to 3/4 in) in diameter. The color ranges from umber to isabella (dark dingy yellow-brown) when the mushroom is moist, and changes to pinkish-buff when dry. The cap margin can have a greenish-gray tinge. The cap cuticle is a thin gelatinous covering that can be peeled off.

The gills have an adnate attachment to the cap, are narrow to moderately broad, closely spaced, and eventually separate from the stem. Young gills are cinnamon-brown in color, with lighter edges, but darken in maturity because they become covered with the dark spores. The stem is 6 to 8 cm (2 3/8 to 3 1/8 in) long by 1.5 to 2 mm (1/16 to 3/32 in) thick, and roughly equal in width throughout except for a slightly enlarged base; rather pliant but rigid. The lower region of the stem is brownish in color and has silky fibrils pressed against the stem; the upper region is grayish and pruinose (lightly dusted with powdery white granules). The flesh turns slightly bluish or greenish where it has been injured. The application of a drop of dilute potassium hydroxide solution on the cap or flesh will cause a color change to pale to dark yellowish to reddish brown; a drop on the stem produces a less intense or no color change.

The spore print is purplish brown. Under the microscope, the spores appear dull purple-brown. They are ellipsoid to somewhat egg-shaped, and, according to Singer's original description, measure 8–10 by 4–5 μm. A later study of specimens collected from British Columbia, Canada, instead reported a larger spore size range of 10–13 by 6–7 μm. The spores have an apical germ pore. The basidia (spore-bearing cells) are four-spored, hyaline (translucent), and measure 22–35 by 7–10 μm. There are abundant cystidia that form a sterile band on the edges of the gills (cheilocystidia); these cystidia are smooth, inflated, and fusoid-ventricose (enlarged in the middle and tapered toward both ends) with a sharp tip, and measure 25–30 by 6–9 μm. The cap cuticle (an ixocutis) is made of a layer of roughly horizontal, gelatinized, wavy, hyaline hyphae that are 0.8–5.5 μm in diameter.

=== Similar species ===
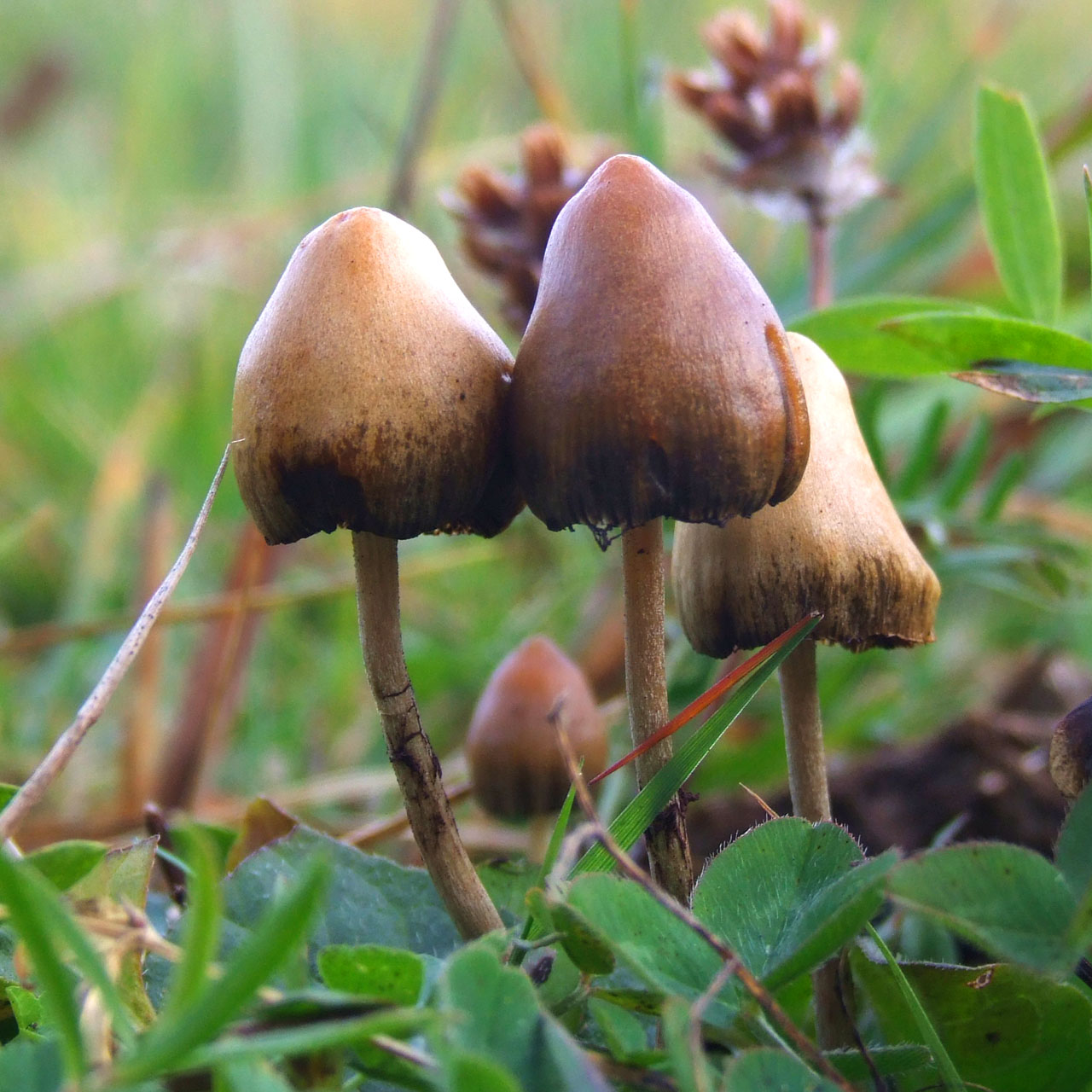
Psilocybe semilanceata

The overall stature of the fruit bodies of P. pelliculosa is generally similar to those of Mycena, Galerina, or Hypholoma. Smith noted a superficial resemblance to Psathyrella fagicola, based on similarities in the nature of the cap cuticle, the coloring, and the stem base covered in silky fibers. Psilocybe pelliculosa may be distinguished from Psathyra fagicola by the presence of a partial veil, firm gills, and smaller fruit bodies. P. pelliculosa is frequently mistaken for the widespread P. semilanceata, but the latter can be distinguished by its larger spores and a conical, papillate cap. Another similar species is Psilocybe silvatica, and a microscope is needed to reliably distinguish between the two species. P. silvatica, found from New York to Michigan and north to Canada, has longer spores. P. pelliculosa has a general resemblance to Hypholoma dispersum, a species found in northern North America and Europe.

== Habitat and distribution ==
The fruit bodies of P. pelliculosa grow in groups or clusters on moss, forest debris, and humus in coniferous forests. The fungus prefers to fruit in disturbed areas such as trails and abandoned forest roads; it is not commonly found in grasslands. It is known from the Pacific Northwest region of North America where it has been collected in California, Idaho, Oregon, Washington, and it is widely distributed in British Columbia, Canada. It is also found in northern Europe, a single collection from Finland. The fungus often fruits along forest paths and abandoned logging roads where alders and firs are growing. Fruit bodies tend to appear in late summer to early winter after cool, wet weather.

== Psychoactivity ==
Psilocybe pelliculosa contains the psychoactive compounds psilocybin and baeocystin, and is used as a recreational drug. In terms of psychoactive potency, Stamets considers the species "relatively weak". Psilocybin levels have been reported to range from 1.2 to 1.7 milligrams per gram of dried mushroom, while baeocystin was measured at 0.04%.

== See also ==
- List of Psilocybe species
- List of Psilocybin mushrooms
- Psilocybin mushrooms
