= Hebeloma cylindrosporum =

Scientific classification
- Kingdom: Fungi
- Division: Basidiomycota
- Class: Agaricomycetes
- Order: Agaricales
- Family: Hymenogastraceae
- Genus: Hebeloma
- Species: H. cylindrosporum

Binomial name
- Hebeloma cylindrosporum Romagn. (1965)

Species of fungus

Hebeloma cylindrosporum is a species of mushroom-forming fungus in the genus Hebeloma and the family Hymenogastraceae. The mushroom is a Basidiomycota, which has many of the mushroom-forming fungi species. It was described as new to science in 1965 by French mycologist Henri Romagnesi.

== Taxonomy and Phylogeny ==
Cylindr- is derived from Greek and means cylindrical, and -sporum is derived from Latin and means it has a spore. Cylindrosporum then means "cylindrical and sporus".

The mushroom was first described by the mycologist Henri Romagnesi, who found the mushroom in France in 1961. However, the mycologist A.A. Pearson had found the mushroom in South Africa in 1948.

The genetic material of H. cylindrosporum has been sequenced. It has been found that the Hebeloma genus phylogenetic data may be "related to saprotrophic species in the genera Agrocybe or Pholiota". The species H. cylindrosporum is "phylogenetically distantly related to H. crustuliniforme, and other Hebeloma species".

== Morphology ==
Image of features of a mushroom with basidium.

The cap of the mushroom is usually convex, and the color of the mushroom is usually a "yellowish brown, occasionally dark brick, rarely cinnamon". H. cylindrosporum has gills that are usually notched before attaching to the stem of the fungi, but the gills are sometimes not notched before attaching to the stem.

H. cylindrosporum spores are cylindrically shaped, which is also where the fungus gets its name. The spores are "often brown, occasionally yellow brown, rarely beige or yellow". The fugus does have a basidia.

== Ecology ==
H. cylindrosporum is an ectomycorrhizal species of fungi. The fungus is "associated with Pinus pinaster". The H. cylindrosporum forms a Hartig net with the roots of the pine tree, and helps the pine tree to take up phosphorus and nitrogen. H. cylindrosporum can also associate with other hosts such as Larix laricina, Dryas integrifolia, and Quercus acutissima in a laboratory.

The fungus has mainly been found in Europe. However, the fungus has been found in Africa and Temperate Asia. H. cylindrosporum has been found in "sandy soils with no or very little organic matter", mostly being found in "costal sand dune ecosystems along the Atlantic south-west coast of France".

== Relevance for Humans ==
There have been several studies done accessing how H. cylindrosporum interacts with different metals.

In one study, it was found that H. cylindrosporum has two genes that are "involved in metal homeostasis and detoxification". The study found that both genes were able to show some sort of response to copper, but only one of the genes was "highly responsive to Cu induction and is likely to be involved in the detoxification of this metal". The gene that was less responsive to copper was found to be the only gene "involved in conferring tolerance to Cd". Another study involving cadmium and H. cylindrosporum found that an enzyme made by the fungus increased the production of "a core component in the mycorrhizal defense system under Cd stress for Cd homeostasis and detoxification".

In another study involving arsenic and H. cylindrosporum, it was found that "when in an As contaminated soil, these ECM fungi forms a symbiotic association with the plant roots, protecting the host plant from As stress". This study found that the fungi "transfer of soil As to plant roots by conjugating it with gluthathione and accumulating inside the vacuoles". The researchers conclude "that H. cylindrosporum is efficient in dealing with As stress and may offer global potential in its bioremediation".

== See also ==
- List of Hebeloma species
