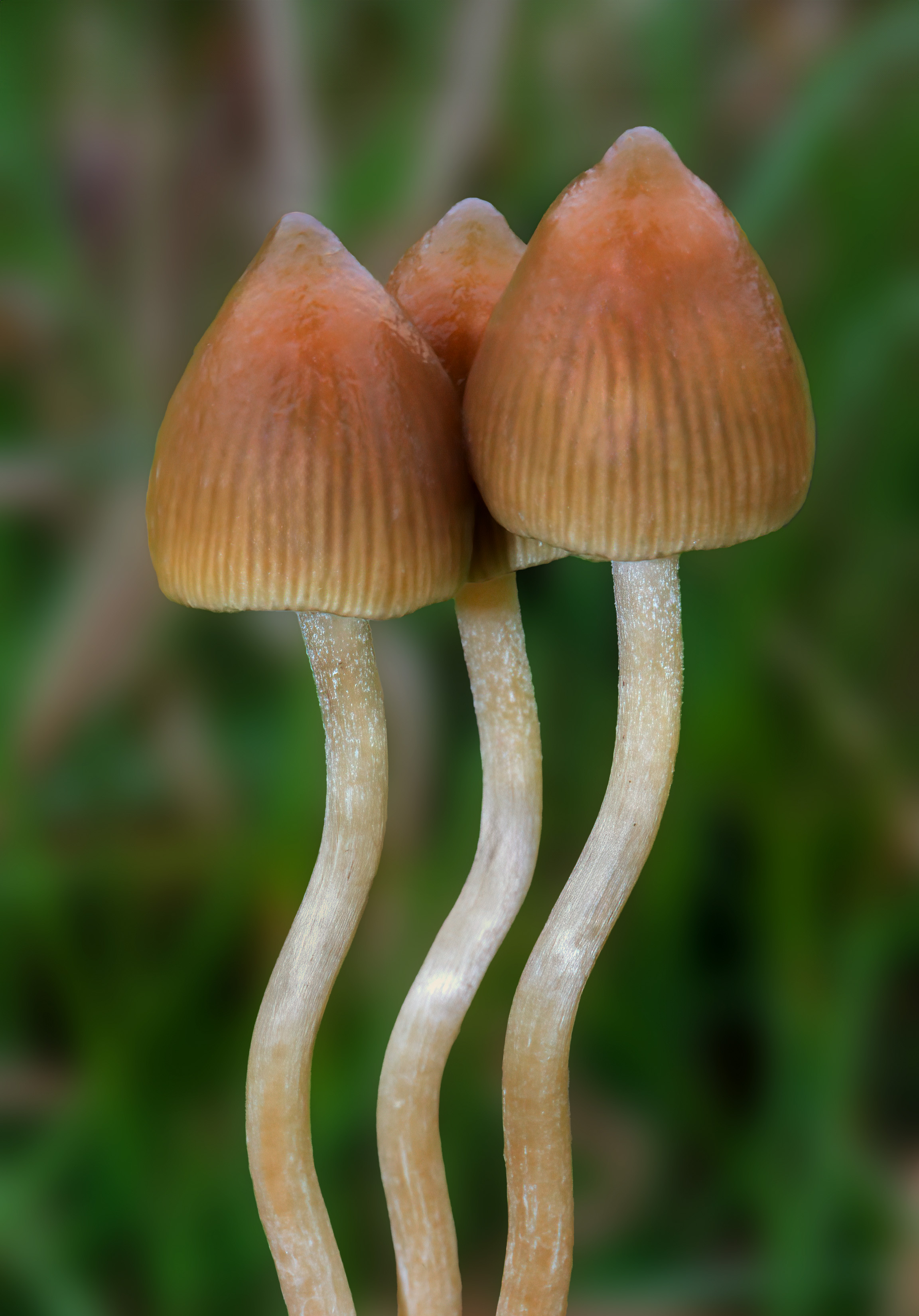

Scientific classification
- Kingdom: Fungi
- Division: Basidiomycota
- Class: Agaricomycetes
- Order: Agaricales
- Family: Hymenogastraceae
- Genus: Psilocybe
- Species: P. semilanceata

Binomial name
- Psilocybe semilanceata (Fr.) P.Kumm. (1871)

Synonyms
- Agaricus semilanceatus Fr. (1838); Geophila semilanceata (Fr.) Quél. (1886); Panaeolus semilanceatus (Fr.) J.E.Lange (1936); Panaeolus semilanceatus (Fr.) J.E.Lange (1939)

= Psilocybe semilanceata =

Species of fungus native to Europe

Psilocybe semilanceata
- Mycological characteristics
- Gills on hymenium
- Cap is conical or umbonate
- Hymenium is adnate or adnexed
- Stipe is bare
- Spore print is brown to purple
- Ecology is saprotrophic
- Edibility is psychoactive

Psilocybe semilanceata, commonly known as the liberty cap, is a species of fungus which produces psilocybin, psilocin and baeocystin. It is one of the most widely distributed psilocybin mushrooms in nature. The mushrooms have a distinctive conical to bell-shaped cap, up to 2.5 cm (1 in) in diameter, with a small nipple-like protrusion on the top. They are yellow to brown, covered with radial grooves when moist, and fade to a lighter color as they mature. Their stipes tend to be slender and long, and the same color or slightly lighter than the cap. The gill attachment to the stipe is adnexed (narrowly attached), and they are initially cream-colored before tinting purple to black as the spores mature. The spores are dark purplish-brown en masse, ellipsoid in shape, and measure 10.5–15 by 6.5–8.5 μm.

The mushroom grows in grassland habitats, especially wetter areas. Unlike P. cubensis, the fungus does not grow directly on dung; rather, it is a saprobic species that feeds off decaying grass roots. It is widely distributed in the temperate areas of the Northern Hemisphere, particularly in Europe, and has been reported occasionally in temperate areas of the Southern Hemisphere as well. The earliest reliable history of P. semilanceata intoxication dates back to 1799 in London, and in the 1960s the mushroom was the first European species confirmed to contain psilocybin. The possession or sale of psilocybin mushrooms is illegal in many countries.

== Taxonomy ==
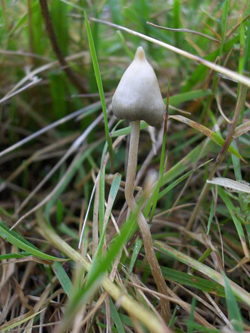
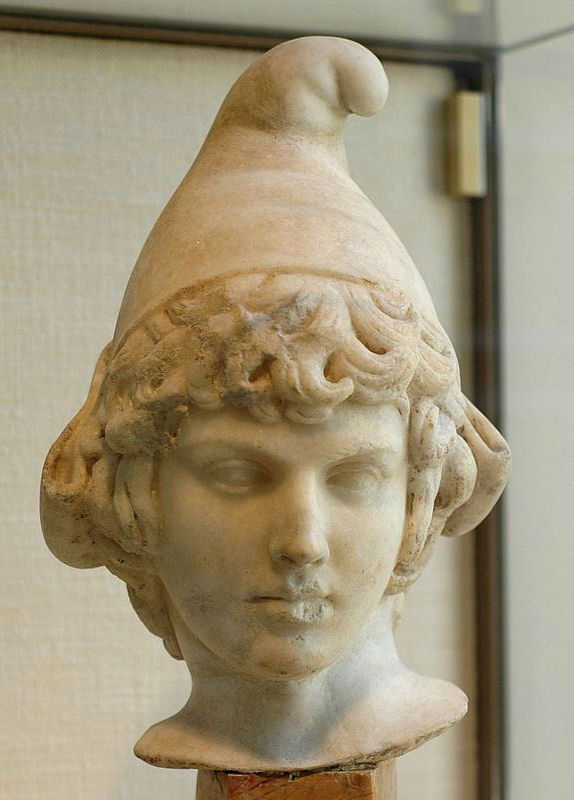
The mushroom gets its common name from its resemblance to the Phrygian cap.

The species was first described by Elias Magnus Fries as Agaricus semilanceatus in his 1838 work Epicrisis Systematis Mycologici. Paul Kummer transferred it to Psilocybe in 1871 when he raised many of Fries's sub-groupings of Agaricus to the level of genus. Panaeolus semilanceatus, named by Jakob Emanuel Lange in both 1936 and 1939 publications, is a synonym. According to the taxonomical database MycoBank, several taxa once considered varieties of P. semilanceata to be synonymous with the species now known as Psilocybe strictipes: the caerulescens variety described by Pier Andrea Saccardo in 1887 (originally named Agaricus semilanceatus var. coerulescens by Mordecai Cubitt Cooke in 1881), the microspora variety described by Rolf Singer in 1969, and the obtusata variety described by Marcel Bon in 1985.

Several molecular studies published in the 2000s demonstrated that Psilocybe, as it was defined then, was polyphyletic. The studies supported the idea of dividing the genus into two clades, one consisting of the bluing, hallucinogenic species in the family Hymenogastraceae, and the other the non-bluing, non-hallucinogenic species in the family Strophariaceae. However, the generally accepted lectotype (a specimen later selected when the original author of a taxon name did not designate a type) of the genus as a whole was Psilocybe montana, which is a non-bluing, non-hallucinogenic species. If the non-bluing, non-hallucinogenic species in the study were to be segregated, it would have left the hallucinogenic clade without a valid name. To resolve this dilemma, several mycologists proposed in a 2005 publication to conserve the name Psilocybe, with P. semilanceata as the type. As they explained, conserving the name Psilocybe in this way would prevent nomenclatural changes to a well-known group of fungi, many species of which are "linked to archaeology, anthropology, religion, alternate life styles, forensic science, law enforcement, laws and regulation". Further, the name P. semilanceata had historically been accepted as the lectotype by many authors in the period 1938–68. The proposal to conserve the name Psilocybe, with P. semilanceata as the type was accepted unanimously by the Nomenclature Committee for Fungi in 2009.

The mushroom takes its common name from the Phrygian cap, also known as the "liberty cap", which it resembles; P. semilanceata shares its common name with P. pelliculosa, a species from which it is more or less indistinguishable in appearance. The Latin word for Phrygian cap is pileus, nowadays the technical name for what is commonly known as the "cap" of a fungal fruit body. In the 18th century, Phrygian caps were placed on Liberty poles, which resemble the stipe of the mushroom. The generic name is derived from Ancient Greek psilos (ψιλός) 'smooth, bare' and Byzantine Greek kubê (κύβη) 'head'. The specific epithet comes from Latin semi 'half, somewhat' and lanceata, from lanceolatus 'spear-shaped'.

== Description ==
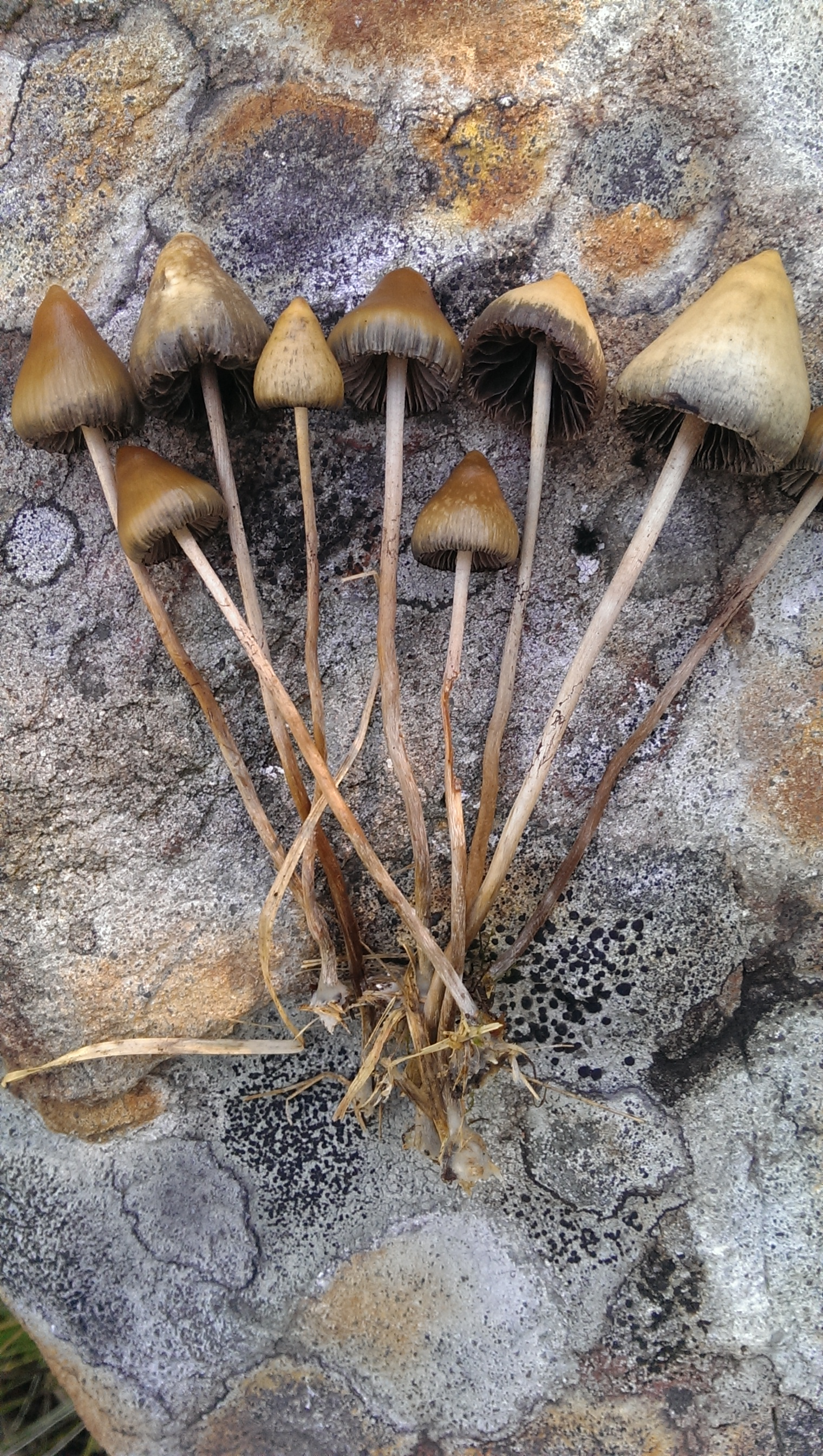
A collection from Norway

The cap of P. semilanceata is 5–25 mm (0.20–0.98 in) in diameter and 6–22 mm (0.24–0.87 in) tall. It varies in shape from sharply conical to bell-shaped, often with a prominent papilla (a nipple-shaped structure), and does not change shape considerably as it ages. The cap margin is initially rolled inward but unrolls to become straight or even curled upwards in maturity. The cap is hygrophanous, meaning it assumes different colors depending on its state of hydration. When it is moist, the cap is ochraceous to pale brown to dark chestnut brown, but darker in the center, often with a greenish-blue tinge. When moist, radial grooves (striations) can be seen on the cap that correspond to the positions of the gills underneath. When the cap is dry, it becomes much paler, a light yellow-brown color. Moist mushrooms have sticky surfaces that result from a thin gelatinous film called a pellicle. This film becomes apparent if a piece of the cap is broken by bending it back and peeling away the piece. When the cap dries from exposure to the sun, the film turns whitish and is no longer peelable.

On the underside of the mushroom's cap, there are between 15 and 27 individual narrow gills that are moderately crowded together, and they have a narrowly adnexed to almost free attachment to the stipe. Their color is initially pale brown, but becomes dark gray to purple-brown with a lighter edge as the spores mature. The slender yellowish-brown stipe is 4.5–14 cm (1.8–5.5 in) long by 1–3.5 mm (0.04–0.14 in) thick, and usually slightly thicker towards the base. The mushroom has a thin cobweb-like partial veil that does not last long before disappearing; sometimes, the partial veil leaves an annular zone on the stipe that may be darkened by spores. The flesh is thin and membrane-like, and roughly the same color as the surface tissue. It has a farinaceous (similar to freshly ground flour) odor and taste. All parts of the mushroom will stain a bluish color if handled or bruised, and it may naturally turn blue with age.

=== Microscopic characteristics ===
In deposit, the spores are a deep reddish purple-brown color. The use of an optical microscope can reveal further details: the spores are oblong when seen in side view, and oblong to oval in frontal view, with dimensions of 10.5–15 by 6.5–8.5 μm. The basidia (spore bearing cells of the hymenium), are 20–31 by 5–9 μm, four-spored, and have clamps at their bases; there are no basidia found on the sterile gill edge. The cheilocystidia (cystidia on the gill edge) measure 15–30 by 4–7 μm, and are flask-shaped with long thin necks that are 1–3.5 μm wide. P. semilanceata does not have pleurocystidia (cystidia on the gill face). The cap cuticle is up to 90 μm thick, and is made of a tissue layer called an ixocutis—a gelatinized layer of hyphae lying parallel to the cap surface. The hyphae comprising the ixocutis are cylindrical, hyaline, and 1–3.5 μm wide. Immediately under the cap cuticle is the subpellis, made of hyphae that are 4–12 μm wide with yellowish-brown encrusted walls. There are clamp connections present in the hyphae of all tissues.

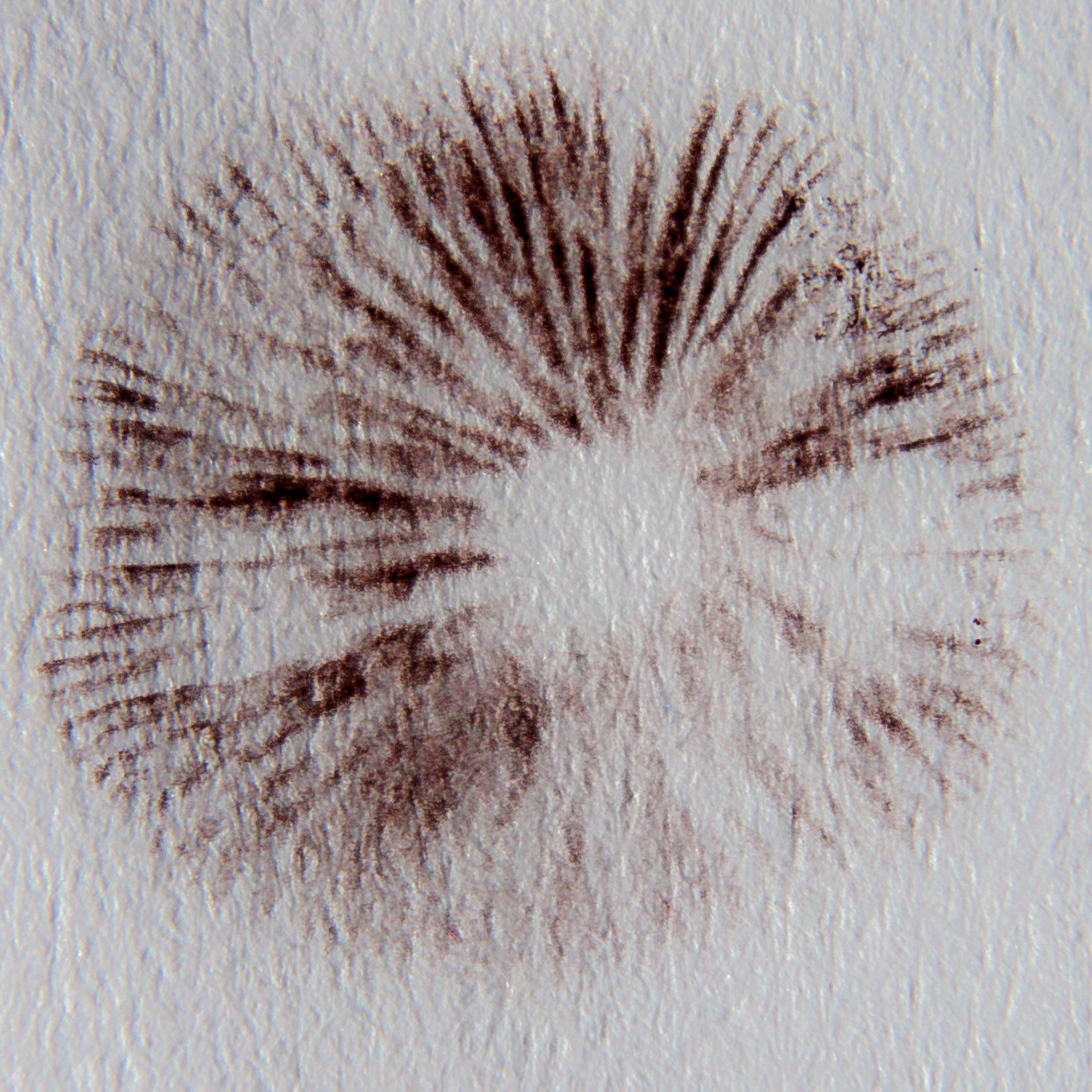
Spore print

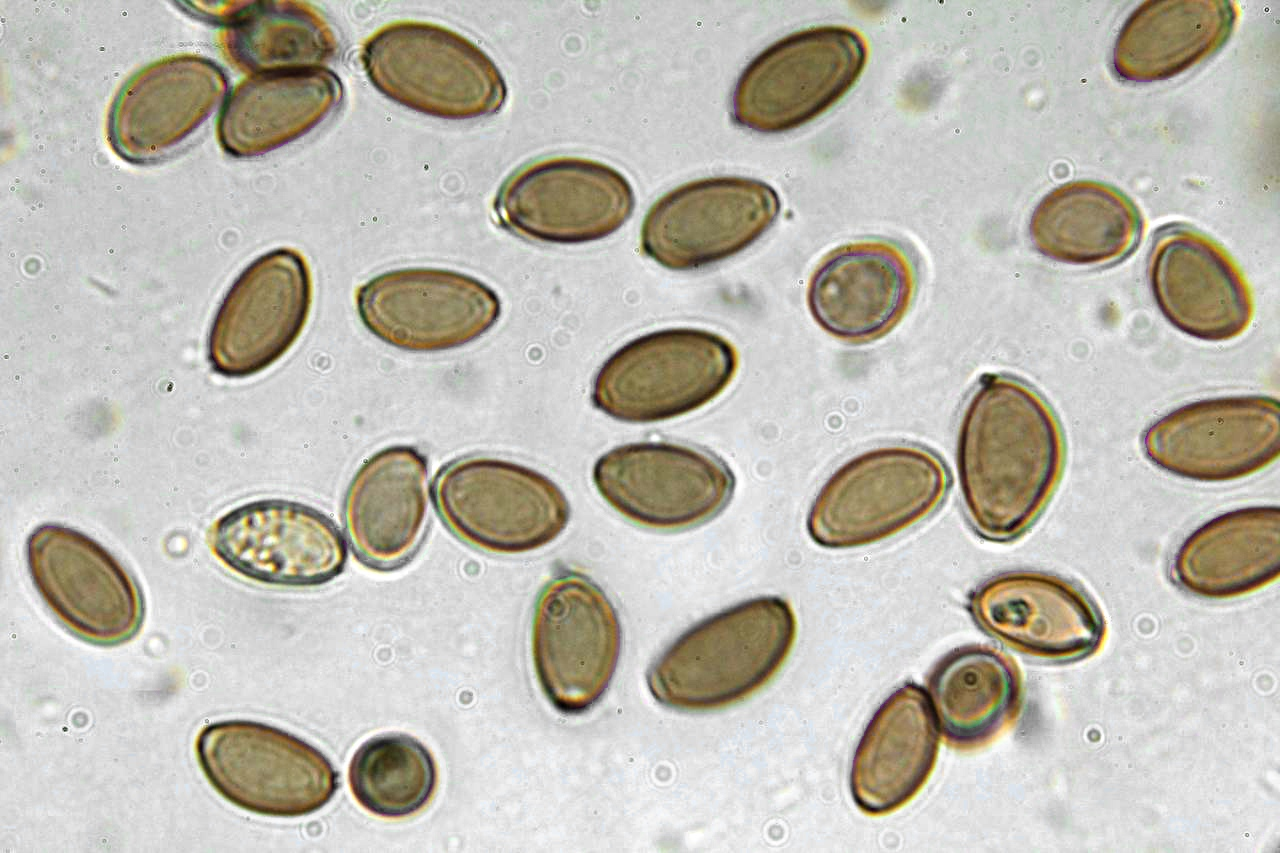
Spores under microscope (x1000)

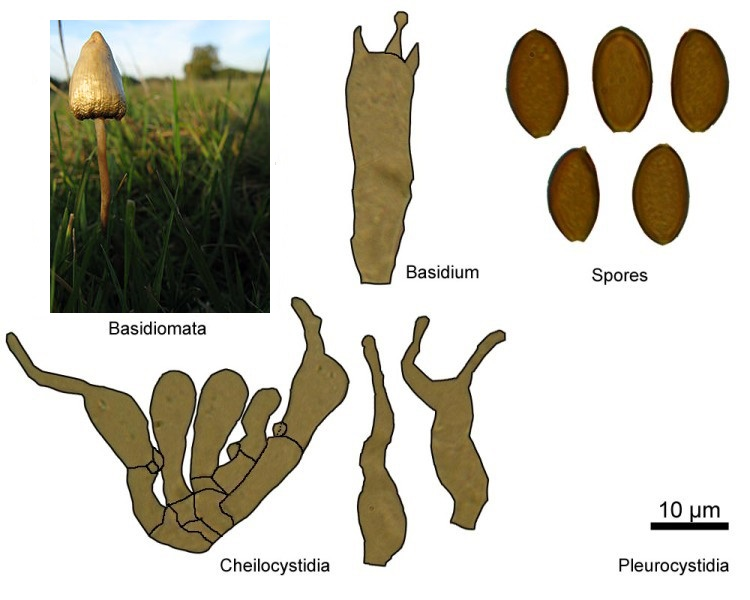
Microscopic characteristics

=== Other forms ===
The anamorphic form of P. semilanceata is an asexual stage in the fungus's life cycle involved in the development of mitotic diaspores (conidia). In culture, grown in a petri dish, the fungus forms a white to pale orange cottony or felt-like mat of mycelia. The conidia formed are straight to curved, measuring 2.0–8.0 by 1.1–2.0 μm, and may contain one to several small intracellular droplets. Although little is known of the anamorphic stage of P. semilanceata beyond the confines of laboratory culture, in general, the morphology of the asexual structures may be used as classical characters in phylogenetic analyses to help understand the evolutionary relationships between related groups of fungi.

Scottish mycologist Roy Watling described sequestrate (truffle-like) or secotioid versions of P. semilanceata he found growing in association with regular fruit bodies. These versions had elongated caps, 20–22 cm (7.9–8.7 in) long and 0.8–1 cm (0.3–0.4 in) wide at the base, with the inward curved margins closely hugging the stipe from the development of membranous flanges. Their gills were narrow, closely crowded together, and anastomosed (fused together in a vein-like network). The color of the gills was sepia with a brownish vinaceous (red wine-colored) cast, and a white margin. The stipes of the fruit bodies were 5–6 cm (2.0–2.4 in) long by 0.1–0.3 cm (0.04–0.12 in) thick, with about 2 cm (0.8 in) of stipe length covered by the extended cap. The thick-walled ellipsoid spores were 12.5–13.5 by 6.5–7 μm. Despite the significant differences in morphology, molecular analysis showed the secotioid version to be the same species as the typical morphotype.

=== Similar species ===
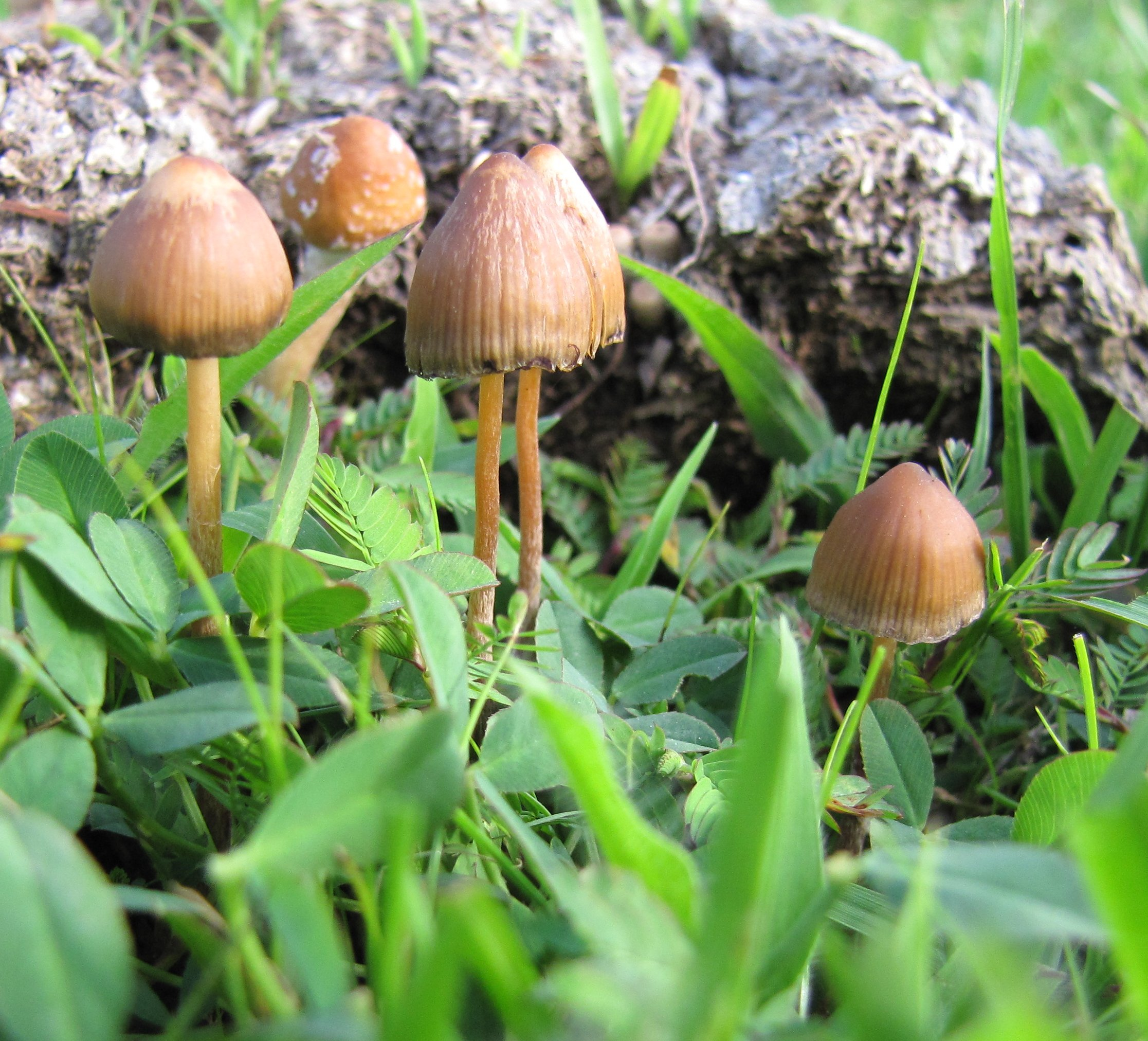
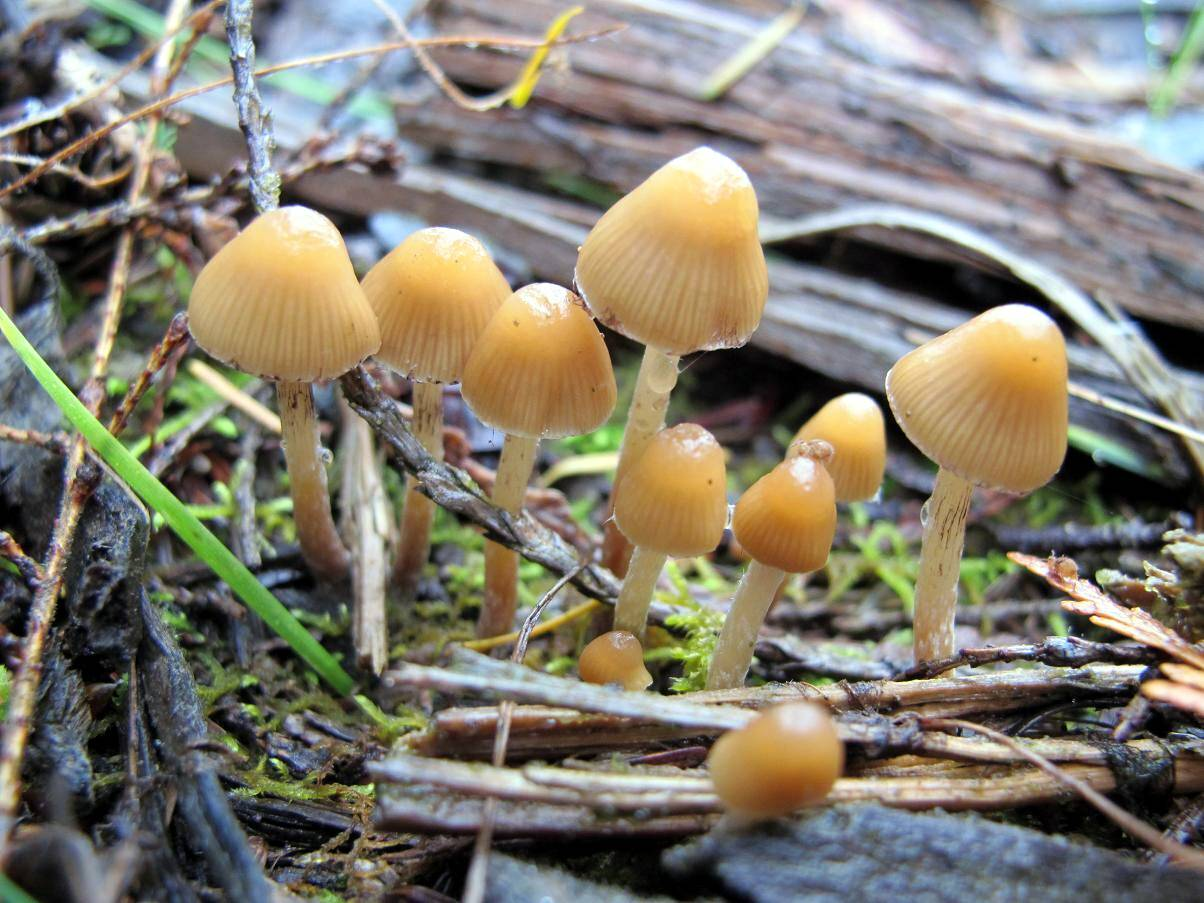
Lookalikes include P. mexicana (left) and P. pelliculosa (right).

There are several other Psilocybe species that may be confused with P. semilanceata due to similarities in physical appearance. P. strictipes is a slender grassland species that is differentiated macroscopically from P. semilanceata by the lack of a prominent papilla. P. mexicana, commonly known as the "Mexican liberty cap", is also similar in appearance, but is found in manure-rich soil in subtropical grasslands in Mexico. It has somewhat smaller spores than P. semilanceata, typically 8–9.9 by 5.5–7.7 μm. Another lookalike species is P. samuiensis, found in Thailand, where it grows in well-manured clay-like soils or among paddy fields. This mushroom can be distinguished from P. semilanceata by its smaller cap, up to 1.5 cm (0.6 in) in diameter, and its rhomboid-shaped spores. P. pelliculosa is physically similar to such a degree that it may be indistinguishable in the field. It differs from P. semilanceata by virtue of its smaller spores, measuring 9–13 by 5–7 μm.

P. semilanceata has also been confused with the toxic muscarine-containing species Inocybe geophylla, a whitish mushroom with a silky cap, yellowish-brown to pale grayish gills, and a dull yellowish-brown spore print.

== Ecology and habitat ==
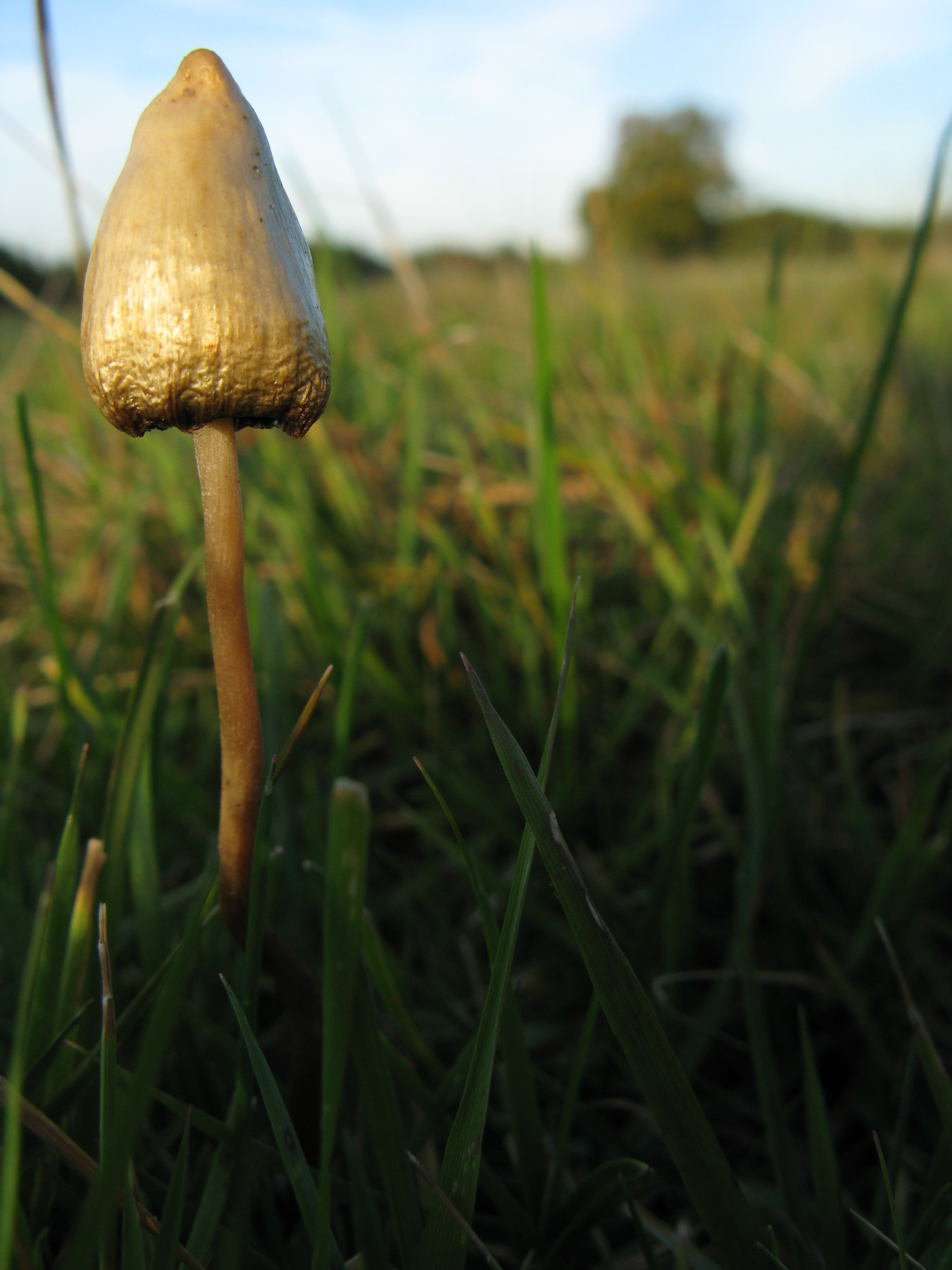
Psilocybe semilanceata is a saprobic grassland species.

Psilocybe semilanceata fruits solitarily or in groups on rich and acidic soil, typically in grasslands, such as meadows, pastures, or lawns. It is often found in pastures that have been fertilized with sheep or cow dung, although it does not typically grow directly on the dung.

P. semilanceata, like all others species of the genus Psilocybe, is a saprobic fungus, meaning it obtains nutrients by breaking down organic matter. The mushroom is also associated with sedges in moist areas of fields, and it is thought to live on the decaying root remains. At least one study has demonstrated an association of P. semilanceata with the roots of the grasses Agrosiis tenuis, Poa annua, and the dicot Lolium perenne.

Like some other grassland psilocybin mushroom species such as P. mexicana, P. tampanensis and Conocybe cyanopus, P. semilanceata may form sclerotia, a dormant form of the fungus, which affords it some protection from wildfires and other natural disasters.

Laboratory tests have shown P. semilanceata to suppress the growth of the soil-borne water mold Phytophthora cinnamomi, a virulent plant pathogen that causes the disease root rot. When grown in dual culture with other saprobic fungi isolated from the rhizosphere of grasses from its habitat, P. semilanceata significantly suppresses their growth. This antifungal activity, which can be traced at least partly to two phenolic compounds it secretes, helps it compete successfully with other fungal species in the intense competition for nutrients provided by decaying plant matter. Using standard antimicrobial susceptibility tests, Psilocybe semilanceata was shown to strongly inhibit the growth of the human pathogen methicillin-resistant Staphylococcus aureus (MRSA). The source of the antimicrobial activity is unknown.

== Distribution ==
Psilocybe authority Gastón Guzmán, in his 1983 monograph on psilocybin mushrooms, considered Psilocybe semilanceata the world's most widespread psilocybin mushroom species, as it has been reported on 18 countries. In Europe, P. semilanceata has a widespread distribution, and is found in Austria, Belarus, Belgium, Bulgaria, the Channel Islands, Czech republic, Denmark, Estonia, the Faroe Islands, Finland, France, Georgia, Germany, Greece, Hungary, Iceland, India, Ireland, Italy, Latvia, Lithuania, the Netherlands, Norway, Poland, Romania, Russia, Slovakia, Slovenia, Spain, Sweden, Switzerland, Turkey, the United Kingdom and Ukraine. It is generally agreed that the species is native to Europe; Watling has demonstrated that there exists little difference between specimens collected from Spain and Scotland, at both the morphological and genetic level.

The mushroom also has a widespread distribution in North America. In Canada it has been collected from British Columbia, New Brunswick, Newfoundland, Nova Scotia, Prince Edward Island, Ontario and Quebec. In the United States, it is most common in the Pacific Northwest, west of the Cascade Mountains, where it fruits abundantly in autumn and early winter; fruiting has also been reported to occur infrequently during spring months. Charles Horton Peck reported the mushroom to occur in New York in the early 20th century, and consequently, much literature published since then has reported the species to be present in the eastern United States. Guzmán later examined Peck's herbarium specimen, and in his comprehensive 1983 monograph on Psilocybe, concluded that Peck had misidentified it with the species now known as Panaeolina foenisecii. P. semilanceata is much less common in South America, where it has been recorded in Chile. It is also known in Australia (where it may be an introduced species) and New Zealand, where it grows in high-altitude grasslands. In 2000, it was reported from Golaghat, in the Indian state of Assam. In 2017, it was reported from Charsadda, in the Pakistani province of Khyber Pakhtunkhwa.

== Psychoactive use ==
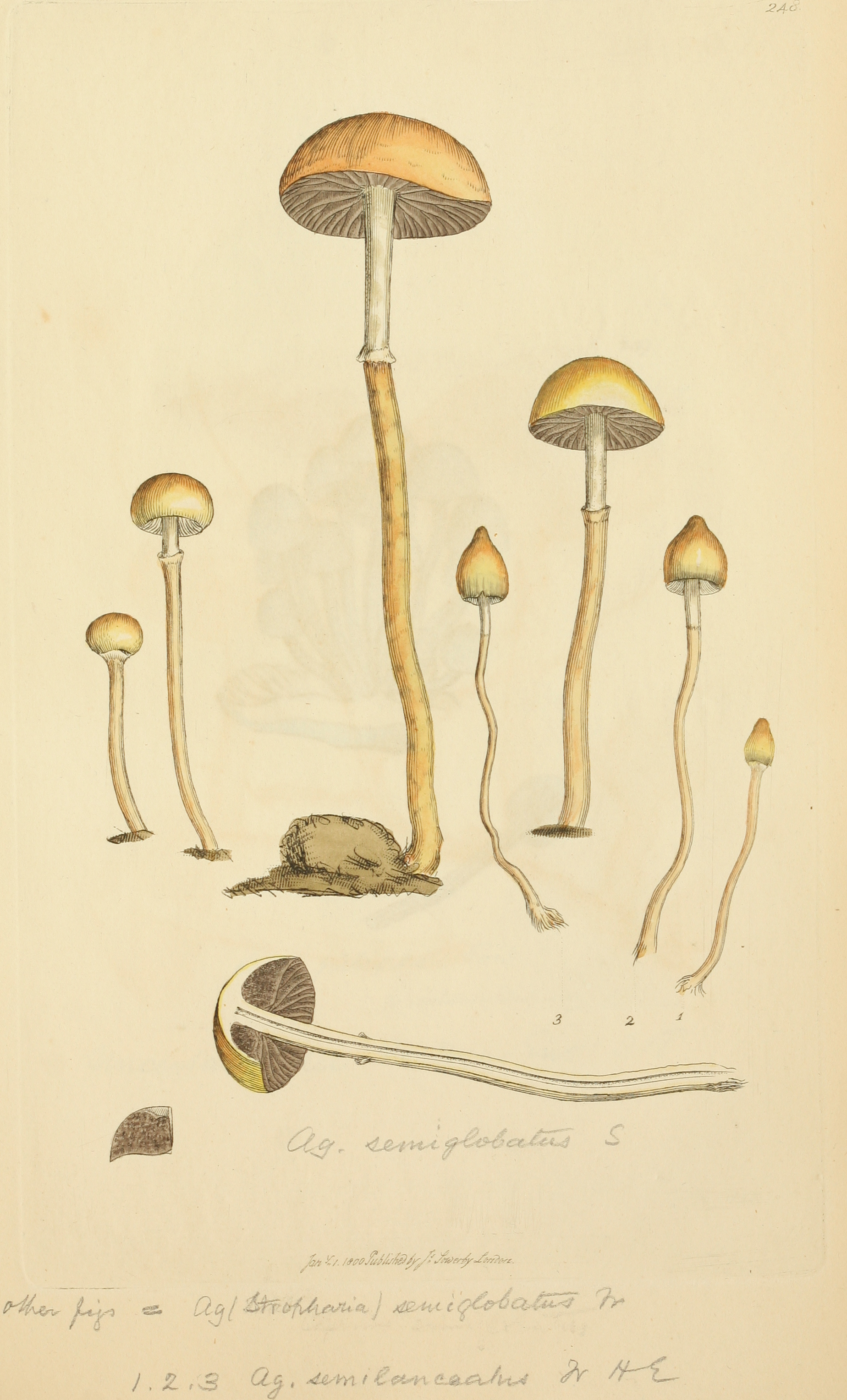
1, 2 and 3 in the figure are Psilocybe semilanceata, which Sowerby wrongly thought was the same as Stropharia semiglobata.

The first reliably documented report of Psilocybe semilanceata intoxication involved a British family in 1799, who prepared a meal with mushrooms they had picked in London's Green Park. According to the chemist Augustus Everard Brande, the father and his four children experienced typical symptoms associated with ingestion, including pupil dilation, spontaneous laughter and delirium. The identification of the species responsible was made possible by James Sowerby's 1803 book Coloured Figures of English Fungi or Mushrooms, which included a description of the fungus, then known as Agaricus glutinosus (originally described by Moses Ashley Curtis in 1780). According to German mycologist Jochen Gartz, the description of the species is "fully compatible with current knowledge about Psilocybe semilanceata."

In the early 1960s, the Swiss scientist Albert Hofmann—known for the synthesis of the psychedelic drug LSD—chemically analyzed P. semilanceata fruit bodies collected in Switzerland and France by the botanist Roger Heim. Using the technique of paper chromatography, Hofmann confirmed the presence of 0.25% (by weight) psilocybin in dried samples. Their 1963 publication was the first report of psilocybin in a European mushroom species; previously, it had been known only in Psilocybe species native to Mexico, Asia and North America. This finding was confirmed in the late 1960s with specimens from Scotland and England, Czechoslovakia (1973), Germany (1977), Norway (1978), and Belgium and Finland (1984). In 1965, forensic characterization of psilocybin-containing mushrooms seized from college students in British Columbia identified P. semilanceata—the first recorded case of intentional recreational use of the mushroom in Canada. The presence of the psilocybin analog baeocystin was confirmed in 1977. Several studies published since then support the idea that the variability of psilocybin content in P. semilanceata is low, regardless of country of origin.

=== Properties ===
Psilocybin

Baeocystin

Several studies have quantified the amounts of hallucinogenic compounds found in the fruit bodies of Psilocybe semilanceata. In 1993, Gartz reported an average of 1% psilocybin (expressed as a percentage of the dry weight of the fruit bodies), ranging from a minimum of 0.2% to a maximum of 2.37% making it one of the most potent species (but significantly less potent than panaeolus cyanescens). In an earlier analysis, Tjakko Stijve and Thom Kuyper (1985) found a high concentration in a single specimen (1.7%) in addition to a relatively high concentration of baeocystin (0.36%). Smaller specimens tend to have the highest percent concentrations of psilocybin, but the absolute amount is highest in larger mushrooms. A Finnish study assayed psilocybin concentrations in old herbarium specimens, and concluded that although psilocybin concentration decreased linearly over time, it was relatively stable. They were able to detect the chemical in specimens that were 115 years old. Michael Beug and Jeremy Bigwood, analyzing specimens from the Pacific Northwest region of the United States, reported psilocybin concentrations ranging from 0.62% to 1.28%, averaging 1.0 ±0.2%. They concluded that the species was one of the most potent, as well as the most constant in psilocybin levels. In a 1996 publication, Paul Stamets defined a "potency rating scale" based on the total content of psychoactive compounds (including psilocybin, psilocin, and baeocystin) in 12 species of Psilocybe mushrooms. Although there are certain caveats with this technique—such as the erroneous assumption that these compounds contribute equally to psychoactive properties—it serves as a rough comparison of potency between species. Despite its small size, Psilocybe semilanceata is considered a "moderately active to extremely potent" hallucinogenic mushroom (meaning the combined percentage of psychoactive compounds is typically between 0.25% to greater than 2%), and of the 12 mushrooms they compared, only 3 were more potent: P. azurescens, P. baeocystis, and P. bohemica. however this data has become obsolete over the years as Panaeolus cyanescens holds the current world record for most potent mushrooms described in published research. According to Gartz (1995), P. semilanceata is Europe's most popular natural hallucinogen.

Several reports have been published in the literature documenting the effects of consumption of P. semilanceata. Typical symptoms include visual distortions of color, depth and form, progressing to visual hallucinations. The effects are similar to the experience following consumption of LSD, although milder. Common side effects of mushroom ingestion include pupil dilation, increased heart rate, unpleasant mood, and overresponsive reflexes. As is typical of the symptoms associated with psilocybin mushroom ingestion, "the effect on mood in particular is dependent on the subject's pre-exposure personality traits", and "identical doses of psilocybin may have widely differing effects in different individuals." Although most cases of intoxication resolve without incident, there have been isolated cases with severe consequences, especially after higher dosages or persistent use. In one case reported in Poland in 1998, an 18-year-old man developed Wolff–Parkinson–White syndrome, arrhythmia, and suffered myocardial infarction after ingesting P. semilanceata frequently over the period of a month. The cardiac damage and myocardial infarction was suggested to be a result of either coronary vasoconstriction, or because of platelet mediated occlusion of small coronary arteries.

==== Danger of misidentification ====
One danger of attempting to consume hallucinogenic or other wild mushrooms, especially for novice mushroom hunters, is the possibility of misidentification with toxic species. In one noted case, an otherwise healthy young Austrian man mistook the poisonous Cortinarius rubellus for P. semilanceata. As a result, he suffered end-stage kidney failure, and required a kidney transplant. In another instance, a young man developed cardiac abnormalities similar to those seen in Takotsubo cardiomyopathy, characterized by a sudden temporary weakening of the myocardium. A polymerase chain reaction-based test to specifically identify P. semilanceata was reported by Polish scientists in 2007.

== Legal status ==
The legal status of psilocybin mushrooms varies worldwide. Psilocybin and psilocin are listed as Class A (United Kingdom) or Schedule I (US) drugs under the United Nations 1971 Convention on Psychotropic Substances. The possession and use of psilocybin mushrooms, including P. semilanceata, is therefore prohibited by extension. Although many European countries remained open to the use and possession of hallucinogenic mushrooms after the US ban, starting in the 2000s (decade) there has been a tightening of laws and enforcements. In the Netherlands, where the drug was once routinely sold in licensed cannabis coffee shops and smart shops, laws were instituted in October 2008 to prohibit the possession or sale of psychedelic mushrooms—the final European country to do so. They are legal in Jamaica and Brazil and decriminalised in Portugal. In the United States, the city of Denver, Colorado, voted in May 2019 to decriminalize the use and possession of psilocybin mushrooms. In November 2020, voters passed Oregon Ballot Measure 109, making Oregon the first state to both decriminalize psilocybin and also legalize it for therapeutic use. Ann Arbor, Michigan, and the county it resides in have decriminalized magic mushrooms. Possession, sale and use are now legal within the county. In 2021, the City Councils of Somerville, Northampton, Cambridge, Massachusetts, and Seattle, Washington, voted for decriminalization.

=== Sweden ===
The Riksdag added P. semilanceata to Narcotic Drugs Punishments Act under Swedish schedule I ("substances, plant materials and fungi which normally do not have medical use") as of 1 October 1997, published by Medical Products Agency (MPA) in regulation LVFS 1997:12 listed as Psilocybe semilanceata (toppslätskivling).

== See also ==
- List of Psilocybe species
- Mushroom hunting
