= Hebeloma spoliatum =

Scientific classification
- Kingdom: Fungi
- Division: Basidiomycota
- Class: Agaricomycetes
- Order: Agaricales
- Family: Hymenogastraceae
- Genus: Hebeloma
- Species: H. spoliatum

Binomial name
- Hebeloma spoliatum (Fr.) Gillet

Species of fungus

Hebeloma spoliatum is a species of mushroom in the family Hymenogastraceae.
