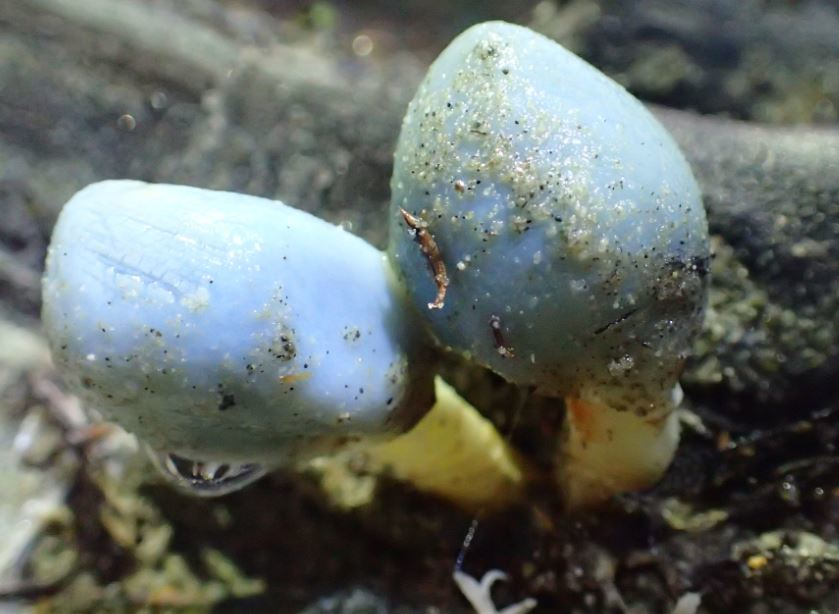

Scientific classification
- Kingdom: Fungi
- Division: Basidiomycota
- Class: Agaricomycetes
- Order: Agaricales
- Family: Agaricaceae
- Genus: Clavogaster
- Species: C. virescens

Binomial name
- Clavogaster virescens (Massee) J.A. Cooper (2015)

Synonyms
- Cauloglossum novozelandicum (Henn.) auct. (1905) (nom. inv.); Clavogaster novozelandicus Henn. (1896); Secotium superbum G. Cunn. (1924); Secotium virescens Massee (1890); Weraroa virescens (Massee) Singer & A.H. Sm. (1958)

= Clavogaster virescens =

Species of fungus

Clavogaster virescens is a species of secotioid or pouch-like fungus in the family Strophariaceae. It is endemic and indigenous to New Zealand, where it grows on rotting wood in native bush and mixed native and introduced forests. It has a stout yellowish stem, and a powder blue, purplish or greenish blue cap that forms a pouch, often referred to as a peridium, enclosing reddish brown or orange chambered gleba. The species is sometimes known as the "Spindle Pouch".

== Taxonomy and naming ==
Clavogaster virescens was described from New Zealand in 1890 as Secotium virescens. At the time the genus Secotium held numerous species of secotioid and gasteroid fungi, many of which were mistakenly thought to be related due to their similar appearances.

In 1958 the genus Weraroa was created for the bluing Weraroa novae-zelandiae (now Psilocybe weraroa). S. virescens was transferred there as Weraroa virescens, along with several morphologically similar species. Advances in research, phylogenetics and DNA barcoding between 1958 and 2015 eventually demonstrated that all species in this genus belonged elsewhere. The genus Weraroa lost its type species to Psilocybe and W. virescens was not related, nor did it belong in any other current genus.

A synonym of W. virescens from 1896, Clavogaster novozelandicus, had once been described as the type species of the genus Clavogaster. In 2015 W. virescens was published anew as Clavogaster virescens. It is now the type species of the genus, and the only formally described species it currently contains.

Additional synonyms of Clavogaster virescens are Secotium superbum, described in 1924 as a large and magnificent blue-green secotioid species with a bright yellow stem, and Cauloglossum novozelandicum, described in 1905.

=== Etymology ===
The species epithet virescens means to grow green or verdant like copper rust, and refers to the greenish blue colour of the pouch.

== Description ==
Clavogaster virescens
- Mycological characteristics
- Glebal hymenium
- Cap is ovate or conical
- Hymenium attachment is not applicable
- Stipe is bare
- Spore print is reddish-brown
- Ecology is saprotrophic
- Edibility is inedible

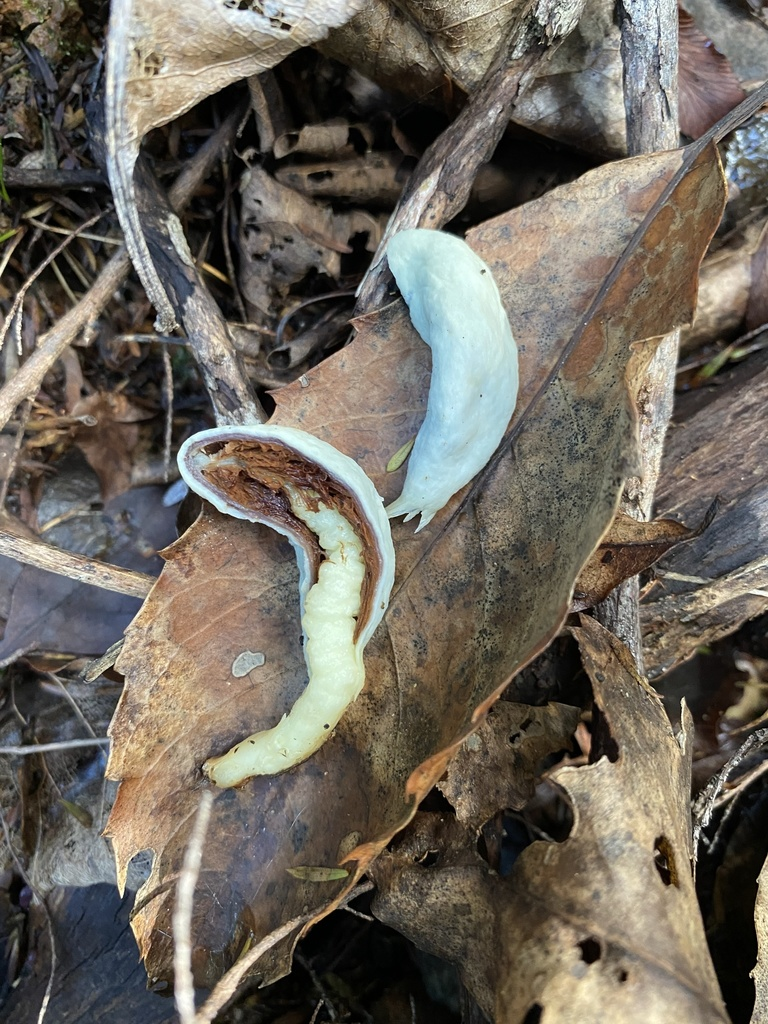
Clavogaster virescens in cross section showing the reddish-brown gleba.

The cap or pileus forms an elongated pouch measuring approximately 20 × 60 mm, it is powder blue, purplish blue or greenish, smooth and glabrous or pitted and furrowed, sometimes long and quite narrow, and usually tapered towards the apex. The base can be attached to the stem then become free as it lifts slightly away, or remain attached and smoothly transition into the stem. The feeling of the pouch is somewhat rubbery and cartilaginous, and it is very slippery when wet; The stem is whitish to yellowish, often a more vibrant yellow towards the base, solid, smooth and stout, widening towards the pouch, often short, sometimes a little shiny or reflective, with a smooth or slightly slippery feel; Inside the pouch the gleba are enclosed inside a purple-brown sack-like layer within the pouch wall, in a regular, chambered cell-like structure, laterally compressed, brown, reddish brown or lighter red, rarely rust-coloured or orange. The fruitbodies grow in forests on rotting wood on or near the forest floor, solitary or in small to large scattered groups.

=== Original descriptions ===
The following original texts are reproduced and available to read in full on the website of Manaaki Whenua – Landcare Research, New Zealand's online fungarium.

- Secotium virescens Massee (1890) described in "Fungi of New Zealand" in 1890: Description, Typification and Notes
- Secotium virescens Massee (1890) published again in 1924 with Description, Habitat, Collections Examined and Notes;
- Secotium superbum sp. nov G. Cunn. (1924) (synonym) described as new to science in 1924, full description including the Latin, Typification, Collections Examined, Description, Habitat and Notes.

== Distribution and habitat ==
Clavogaster virescens is found on both the North and South Island of New Zealand but is more common in the North Island, especially the Wellington and Auckland regions. Scattered to gregarious in forests, from rotting wood, near or on the ground.

== Similar species ==
Clavogaster sp. 'Whakapapa' is an undescribed and related secotioid species. Unlike Clavogaster virescens it may also have an agaricoid form.

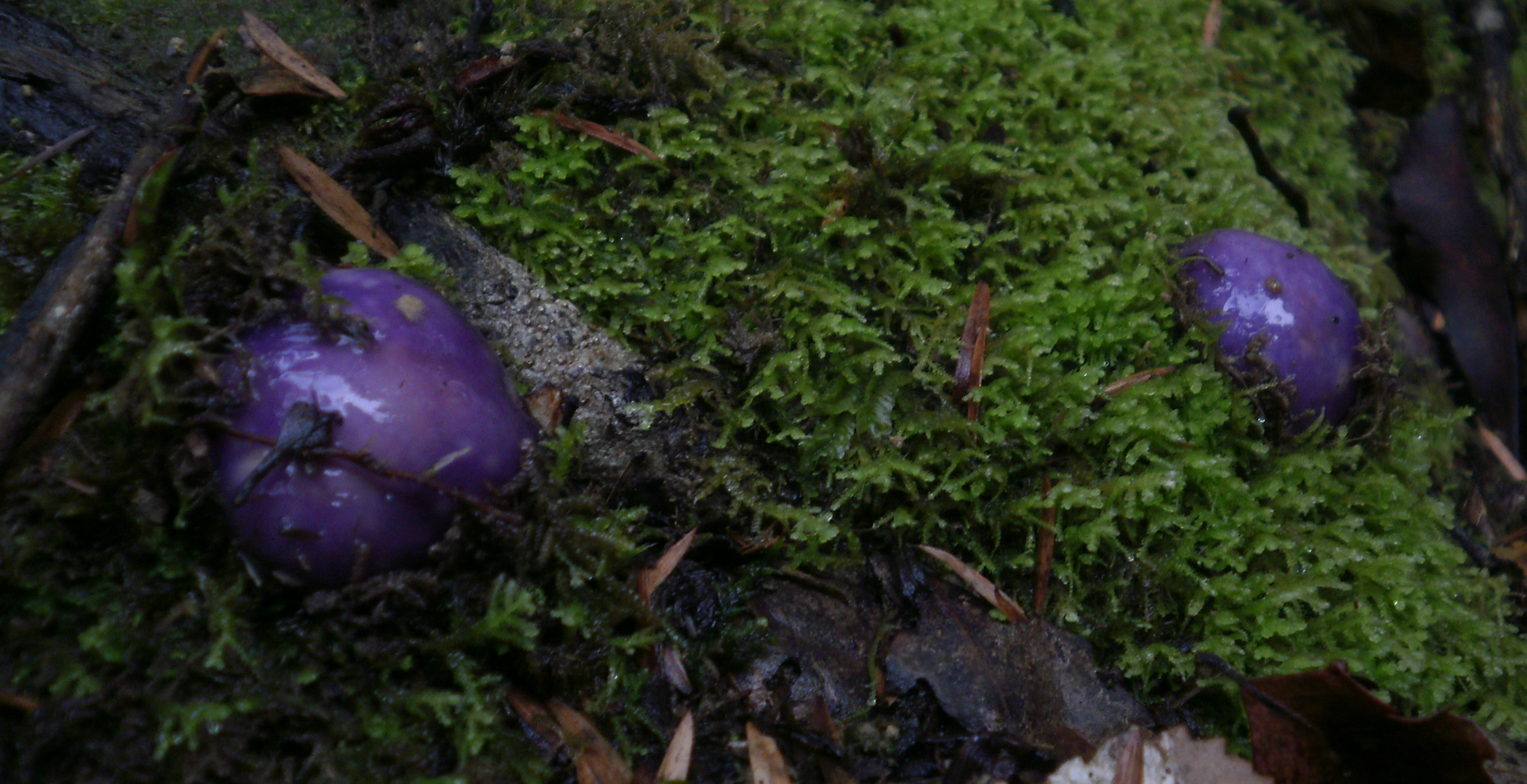
Cortinarius porphyroideus.

Similar pouch-like morphology exists in other genera, especially in New Zealand, with many in the genus Cortinarius. Some are C. beeverorum, C. cartilagineus, C. epiphaeus, C. minorisporus, C. porphyroideus, C. purpureocapitatus, and C. violaceovolvatus.

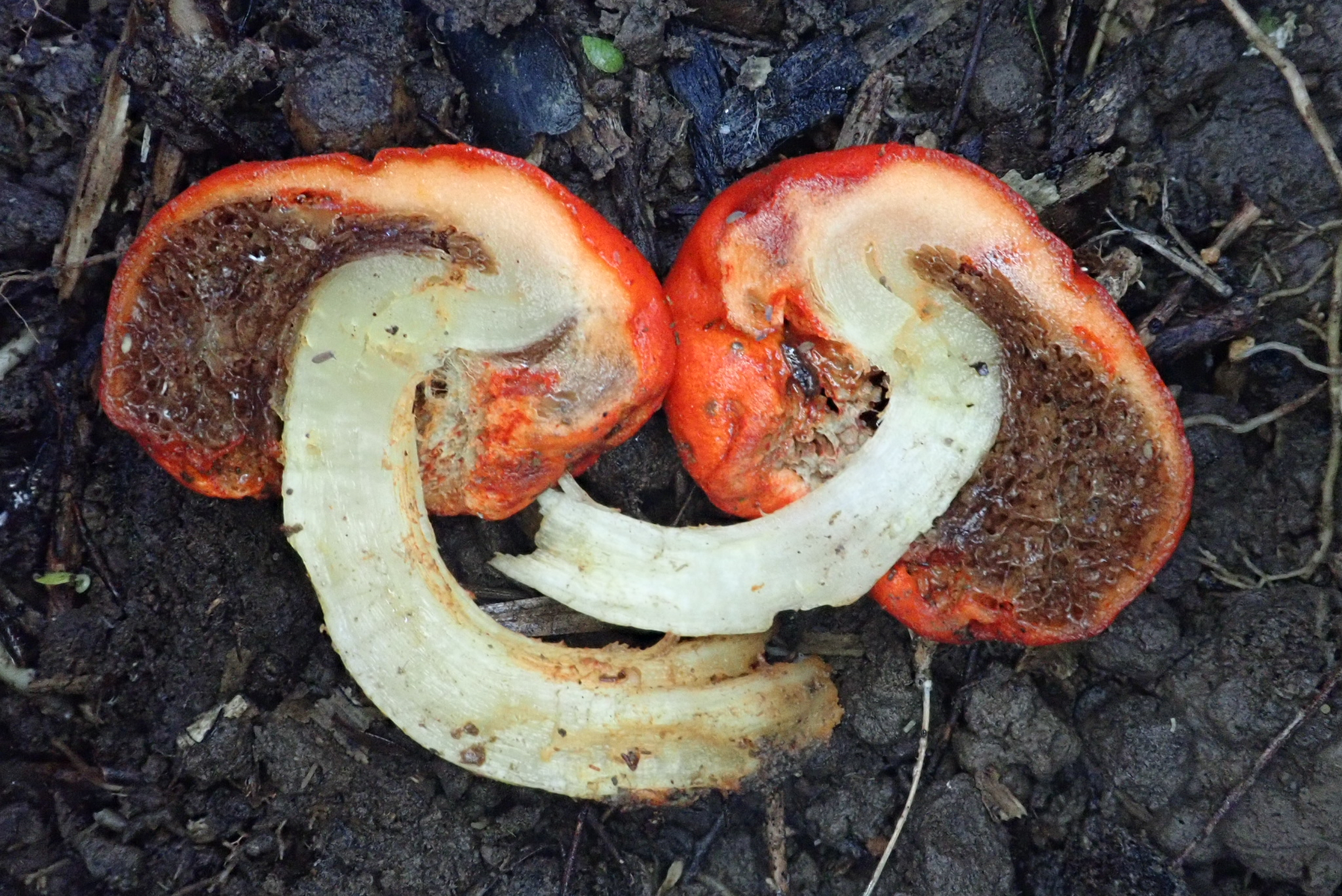
Leratiomyces erythrocephalus, the Scarlet Pouch, a secotioid species morphologically similar to Clavogaster virescens and with a similar taxonomic history.

Leratiomyces erythrocephalus has a similar appearance but is bright red, and the pouch tends to be round rather than elongated.

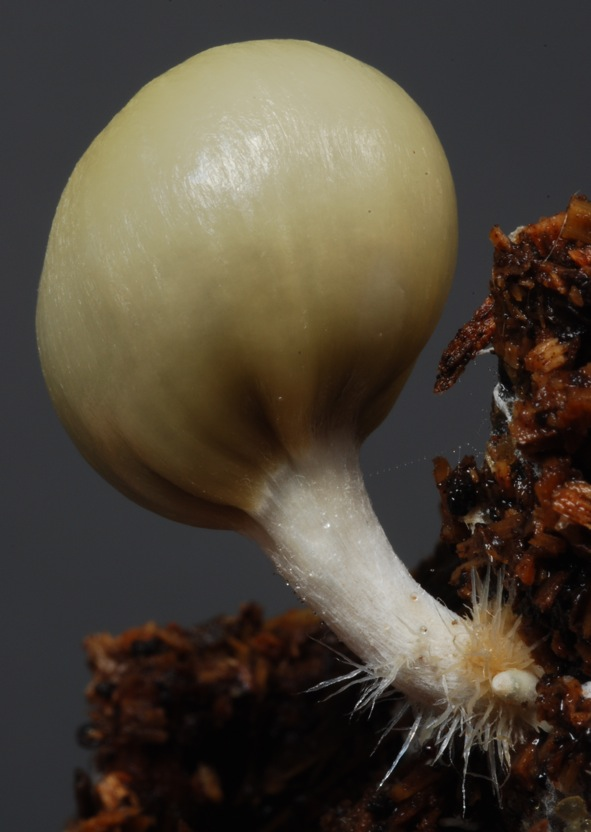
Psilocybe weraroa with a fibrous whitish stem.

Psilocybe weraroa is a close lookalike, and Clavogaster virescens is often mistaken for that species by foragers. It can be a similar shade of off-white to blue when mature, and shares the same habitats. Psilocybe weraroa is psychoactive and demonstrates an additional blueing reaction with damage. It has an equal, moderately thin white stem that is fibrous and often hollow, and the gills or gleba are contorted, twisted chambers, sepia or chocolate-brown to purple-brown. In contrast Clavogaster virescens has reddish-brown to orange gleba enclosed in a sack-like layer, which P. weraroa lacks, arranged in a regular chambered cell-like structure, a solid yellow stem that widens towards the pouch, and no blueing reaction or psychoactive properties.

== See also ==
- Gasteroid fungi
- Secotioid fungi
- The genus Clavogaster
- The genus Secotium
- The genus Weraroa
