= Weraroa =

Scientific classification
- Kingdom: Fungi
- Division: Basidiomycota
- Class: Agaricomycetes
- Order: Agaricales
- Family: Hymenogastraceae
- Genus: Weraroa; Singer

Type species
- Weraroa novae-zelandiae (G. Cunn.) Singer (1956) [Now Psilocybe weraroa]

Genus of fungi

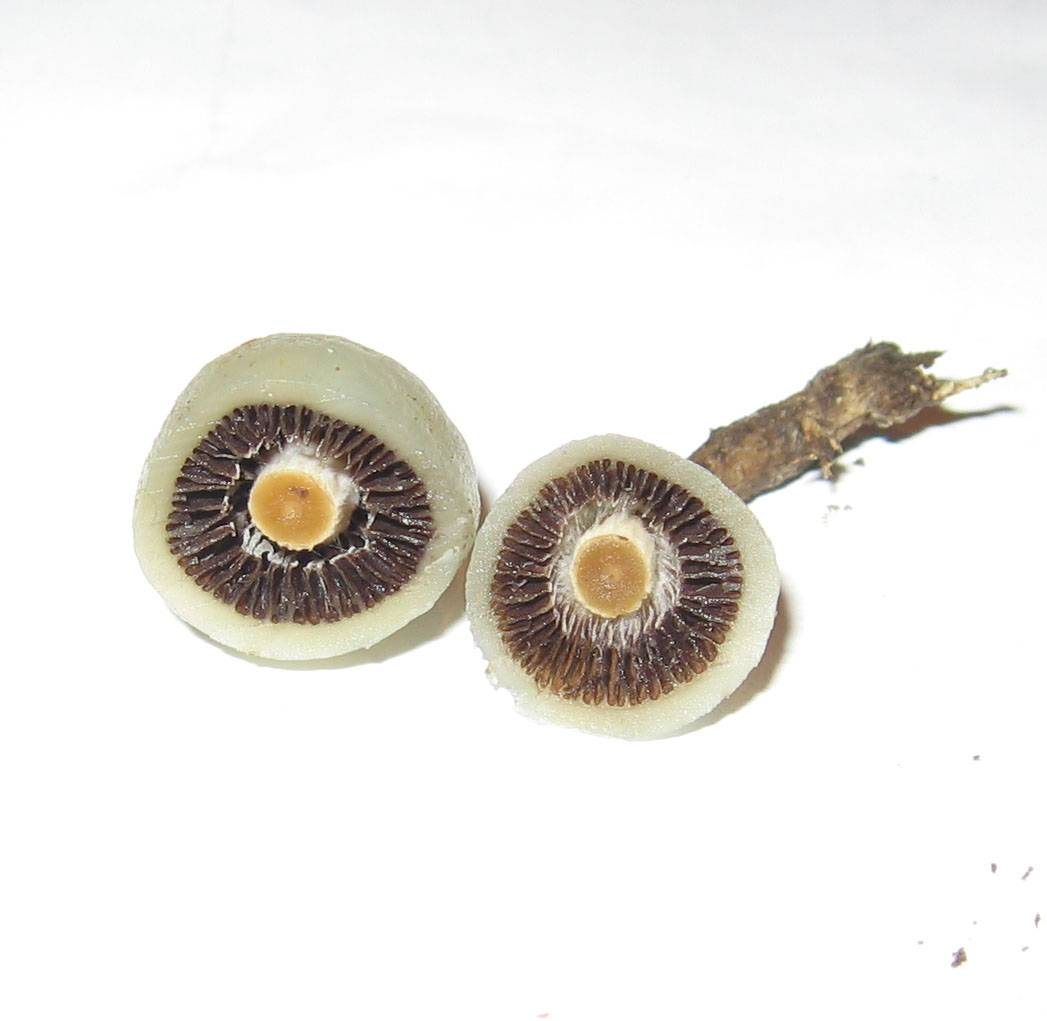
A cross-section of the type species Weraroa novae-zelandiae (Psilocybe weraroa).

Weraroa was a genus of mushrooms from the families Hymenogastraceae and Strophariaceae. The genus was initially described by mycologist Rolf Singer in 1958 to accommodate the single species Secotium novae-zelandiae reported by Gordon Herriott Cunningham in 1924. It was thought that the genus represented an intermediary evolutionary stage between a hypogeous (underground) ancestor and the related epigeous (above ground) genus Stropharia. Advances in phylogenetics and taxonomic changes since 1958 found it contained unrelated species from multiple genera. It is now considered a synonym of the genus Psilocybe.

== Description ==
The following descriptions may not represent all species formerly the genus.

=== Macroscopic ===
Weraroa contained secotioid fungi, meaning that the margin of the pileus rarely breaks free of the stipe, making them resemble somewhat a pouch on the end of a stem, or stalked-puffball. The peridium (outer wall), which at maturity is glutinous, may range in shape from fusoid to spherical to ovoid or ellipsoid.

The gleba consists of elongated loculi that are various shades of brown. The stipe may also be glutinous, and is continuous with a columella reaching and merging with the upper peridium, often with a thin veil-like structure that joins the edge of the peridium with the top of the stipe. The context is fleshy and may be gelatinous in the outer portion of the peridium.

Cunningham was first to report that the mushroom takes a long time to mature, and specimens can also persist for long times.

=== Microscopic ===
Spores are typically from 10 to 20 μm in diameter, ellipsoid in shape, smooth, and pigmented ochre to brownish. The basidia (usually 4-spored) often envelop their sterigmata in gastroid-like fashion (i.e., enclosed), and may be narrower in the middle with a broader base. Chrysocystidium are present on the hymenium, on the sterile surfaces of young specimens, and as endocystidia.

== Habitat and distribution ==
Species are usually found in rainforests or wet grasslands, growing on the ground or on wood; species of Weraroa have been found in New Zealand and the United States.

== Accepted species ==
Few records of these species exist; it is unlikely they truly belong in the genus Weraroa (synn. Psilocybe).

- Weraroa coprophila A.H. Sm. (1956)
- Weraroa nivalis A.H. Sm. (1965)
- Weraroa patagonica Singer & J.E. Wright (1959)
- Weraroa spadicea Singer (1959)

== Former species ==
- Weraroa cucullata (Shope & Seaver) Thiers & Watling (1971) was transferred out of this genus into Leratiomyces as Leratiomyces cucullatus (Shoppe & Seaver) Beever & D.-C. Park (2008).
- Weraroa erythrocephala (Tul. & C. Tul.) Singer & A.H. Sm. (1958) was also transferred into Leratiomyces as Leratiomyces erythrocephalus (Tul. & C. Tul.) Beever & D.-C. Park (2008).
- Weraroa novae-zelandiae (G. Cunn.) Singer (1958), the type species of the genus, was transferred into Psilocybe as Psilocybe weraroa Borov., Oborník & Noordel (2011). Phylogenetic research conducted from 2008 on demonstrated a close relationship between W. novae-zelandiae and the blue-staining Psilocybe in the phylogenetic Cyanescens clade, including Psilocybe cyanescens and Psilocybe subaeruginosa. Around this time research was also demonstrating that the genus Psilocybe was polyphyletic, and that the blueing and non - blueing species belonged in separate genera. As the blueing group did not contain the type species, and because W. novae-zelandiae was the type species for Weraroa, all of the blue-staining Psilocybe species could at that point have been transferred into Weraroa. However, the generic name Psilocybe was conserved for the blueing group with the type species decided as Psilocybe semilanceata (Fr.) P. Kumm (1871). W. novae-zelandiae was, therefore, classified as Psilocybe under the new name (nomen novum) Psilocybe weraroa. The name Weraroa novae-zelandiae was already in use by what is now Deconica novae-zelandiae (Guzmán & E. Horak) J.A. Cooper (2012).
- Weraroa virescens (Massee) Singer & A.H. Sm. (1958) became Clavogaster virescens (Massee) J.A. Cooper (2015), restoring the 1896 genus Clavogaster with a type species. The former type, Clavogaster novozelandicus Henn (1896) had become a later synonym of C. virescens.
