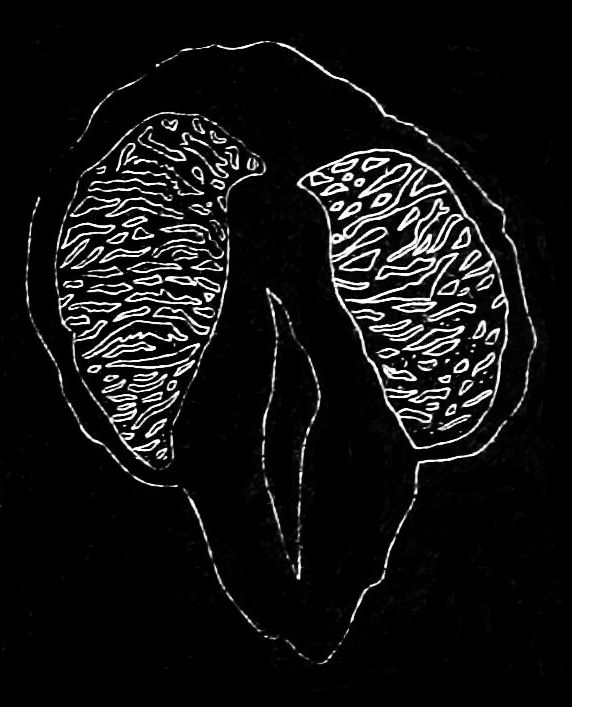
- Secotium varnei

Scientific classification
- Domain: Eukaryota
- Kingdom: Fungi
- Division: Basidiomycota
- Class: Agaricomycetes
- Order: Agaricales
- Family: Agaricaceae
- Genus: Secotium; Kunze (1840)

Type species
- Secotium gueinzii Kunze (1840)

Synonyms
- Artymenium Berk. ex E.Fisch. (1933)

= Secotium =

Genus of fungi

Secotium is a genus of fungi in the family Agaricaceae. The members of this genus are closely related to ordinary Agaricus mushrooms, but do not open out in the usual way; this has given rise to the term "secotioid" for such mushrooms in general. They are thought to form an evolutionary link between agarics and gasteroid fungi (whose spores are enclosed in a pouch-like structure). Secotium is a widespread genus, with species that are predominantly found in warm and arid regions.

== Species ==
- Secotium batava R.Heim & Le Gal 1936
- Secotium coarctatum Berk. 1845
- Secotium coprinoides Routien 1940
- Secotium czerniaievii Mont. 1845
- Secotium decipiens Peck 1895
- Secotium diminutivum Zeller 1939
- Secotium eburneum Zeller 1941
- Secotium fragariosum G.Cunn. 1952
- Secotium globososporum Lloyd 1924
- Secotium gueinzii Kunze 1840
- Secotium himalaicum M.Zang & Yoshim.Doi 1995 — Nepal
- Secotium longipes Zeller 1941
- Secotium obtusum Lloyd 1936
- Secotium ochraceum Rodway 1920
- Secotium selenaspora R.Heim & Le Gal 1936
- Secotium warnei Peck 1882

The secotioid species Agaricus deserticola used to be named Secotium texense before its strong connection to Agaricus caused it to be reclassified. Similarly, in New Zealand Clavogaster virescens was described as both Secotium superbum and Secotium virescens, Leratiomyces erythrocephalus as Secotium erythrocephalum and Psilocybe weraroa as Secotium novae-zelandicus.

== See also ==
- List of Agaricaceae genera
