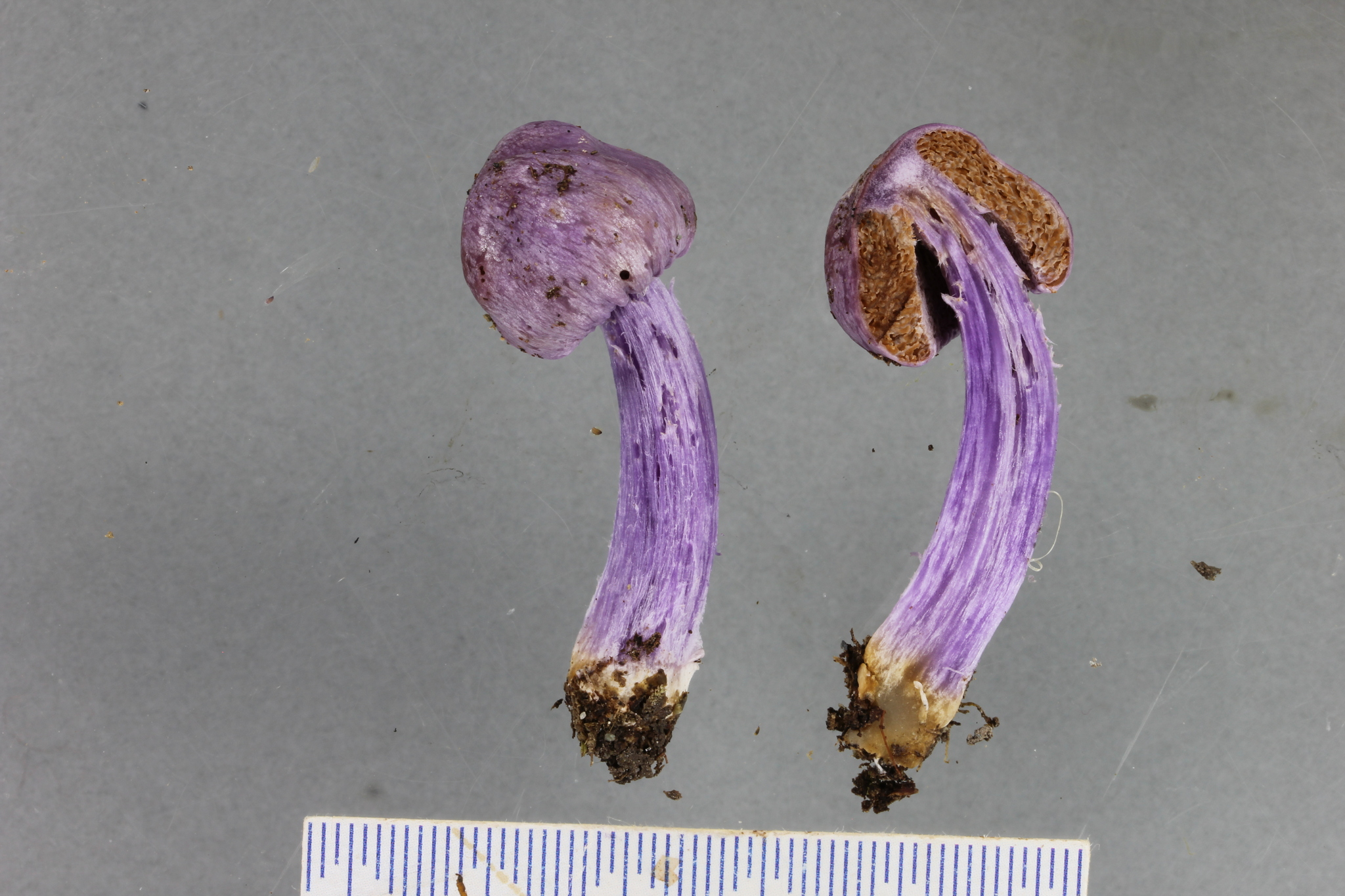

Scientific classification
- Kingdom: Fungi
- Division: Basidiomycota
- Class: Agaricomycetes
- Order: Agaricales
- Family: Cortinariaceae
- Genus: Cortinarius
- Species: C. diaphorus

Binomial name
- Cortinarius diaphorus Soop, A.R. Nilsen & Orlovich

= Cortinarius diaphorus =

Species of fungus

Cortinarius diaphorus is a species of purple pouch fungus in the genus Cortinarius endemic to Aotearoa New Zealand.

== Taxonomy ==
Cortinarius diaphorus was illustrated and noted as an undescribed species (as C. diaphorus ined.) by Karl Soop in the 11th (2017) edition of his book Cortinarioid Fungi of New Zealand. It was formally described in 2020 by Karl Soop, Andy Nilsen and David Orlovich. The holotype specimen was collected in 2017 on the Lake Christabel Track in Victoria Forest Park. The phylogenetic position of C. diaphorus in the genus Cortinarius is not well resolved, with a weak relationship to C. diaphoides in one ITS+28S phylogeny and no supported relationship in the multigene phylogeny of Soop et al.

== Description ==
The species produces secotioid fruit bodies. The pileus ranges from 15 to 25 mm in diameter. It has a rounded shape with an incurved margin. The surface of the pileus has a smooth texture with small cracks or grooves, giving the surface a mottled appearance, slightly slimy, lavender in colour becoming slightly reddish with age. The gleba is yellow-brown to sienna in colour, with irregular locules (compartments) up to 3 mm long, attached at the top of the stipe and becoming free. The stipe is 15 to 45 mm long and 6 to 10 mm wide, centrally attached, pale violet to purple, extending into the pileus as a pale violet columella. The fruit bodies have a delicate silvery veil and no cortina. Tissues of the fruit body show no reaction to a 5% solution of potassium hydroxide. The basidiospores average 13.8 μm long and 7.6 μm wide, are rusty to tawny in colour, ellipsoid to almond-shaped, strongly warted. The spores don't change colour in contact with Melzer's reagent. Cortinarius diaphorus is distinguished from the other purple secotioid Cortinarius species in New Zealand by the combination of lavender colour of the pileus, pale mottling when young and reddening with age, and the strongly warted spores.

== Habitat and distribution ==
Cortinarius diaphorus occurs in the South Island of New Zealand. It is an ectomycorrhizal fungus, found in forests dominated by Nothofagus species including red beech (N. fusca), silver beech (N. menziesii), and hard beech (N. truncata).

== Etymology ==
The specific epithet diaphorus derives from the Greek διαφορος (diaforos) meaning 'different'. This refers to this species being "similar, yet different" from Cortinarius porphyroideus.

== See also ==
- List of Cortinarius species
