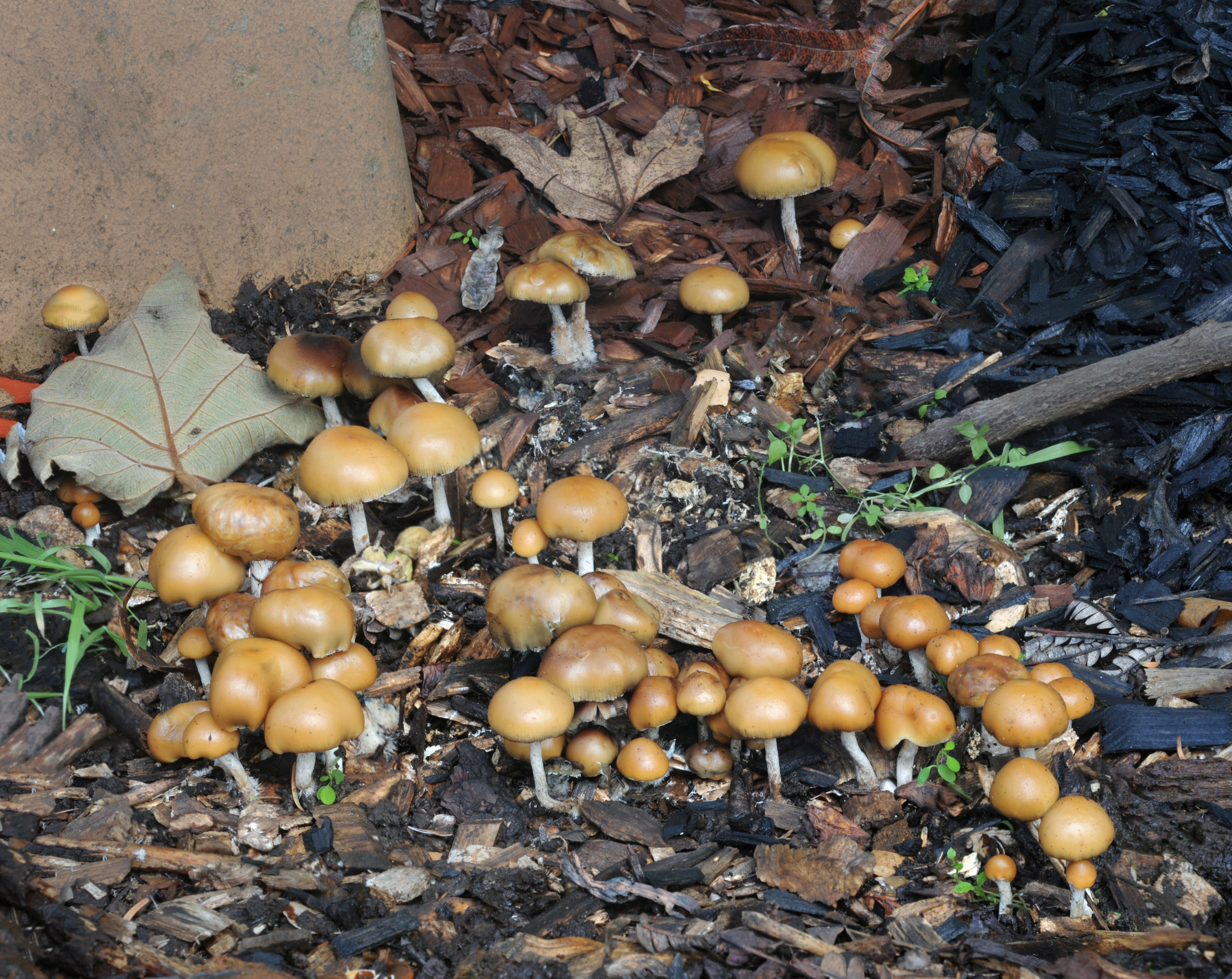

Scientific classification
- Kingdom: Fungi
- Division: Basidiomycota
- Class: Agaricomycetes
- Order: Agaricales
- Family: Hymenogastraceae
- Genus: Psilocybe
- Species: P. allenii

Binomial name
- Psilocybe allenii Borov., Rockefeller & P.G.Werner (2012)

Synonyms
- "Psilocybe cyanofriscosa"

= Psilocybe allenii =

Species of fungus

Psilocybe allenii
- Mycological characteristics
- Gills on hymenium
- Cap is convex or flat
- Hymenium is adnate or sinuate
- Stipe is bare
- Spore print is purple-brown
- Edibility is psychoactive

Psilocybe allenii is a species of agaric fungus in the family Hymenogastraceae. Described as new to science in 2012, it is named after John W. Allen, who provided the type collection. It is found in the northwestern North America from British Columbia, Canada to Los Angeles, California, most commonly within 10 miles (16 km) of the Pacific coast.

The fruitbodies (mushrooms) grow on rotting wood, especially wood chips used in garden landscaping. The caps of the mushrooms are brown to buff, broadly convex to flattened and have a diameter up to 9 cm (3.5 in), while the white stipes are up to 9 cm (3.5 in) long and 0.7 cm (0.3 in) thick. As a bluing species in the genus Psilocybe, P. allenii contains the psychoactive compounds psilocin and psilocybin, and it is consumed recreationally for its hallucinogenic properties. It is closely related to Psilocybe cyanescens, from which it differs macroscopically by the lack of a wavy cap margin.

== Taxonomy ==
- - - - - P. allenii (northwestern North America)
        - P. cyanescens – wavy caps (Pacific Northwest, Europe, and New Zealand)
        - - P. azurescens – flying saucers (west coast of United States)
          - P. subaeruginascens (southern Japan and subtropical Java)
          - P. weraroa (New Zealand endemic)
      - - P. cubensis – magic mushrooms (pan-tropical)
        - P. chuxiongensis (subtropical China)
    - P. serbica (Balkans and Central Europe)
  - - - - P. medullosa (Europe)
        - P. silvatica
      - - P. semilanceata – liberty caps
        - P. pelliculosa – conifer psilocybe (Pacific Northwest)
    - P. atrobrunnea (North America and Europe)

Cladogram depicting the phylogeny of Psilocybe allenii and other closely related Psilocybe species.

Psilocybe allenii was described as new to science in 2012 by Jan Borovička, Alan Rockefeller, and Peter G. Werner. Borovička received material collected from Seattle, Washington, which he noted was microscopically similar to Psilocybe cyanescens, but lacked the wavy cap margins characteristic of that species. In previous publications, Borovička had noted that both macro- and microscopic characters of certain Psilocybe species were highly variable, which could also account for the differences observed in the Seattle material. However, DNA sequencing revealed a 5-base pair change in the internal transcribed spacer regions (a segment of RNA often used in molecular phylogenetics to identify or distinguish fungal species) between P. cyanescens and the Seattle collections. This difference, in addition to the readily observable macroscopic differences, was deemed sufficient to warrant describing the taxon as a new species. Additional molecular studies published by Borovička and colleagues in 2015 identified P. azurescens, P. cyanescens, P. weraroa, P. cubensis, and P. serbica as closely related to P. allenii.

For several years before its official description, the taxon was known in the San Francisco Bay Area, and suspected of being an undescribed species. The authors suggest that a color photograph of "P. cyanescens" in David Arora's popular 1986 guidebook Mushrooms Demystified may actually depict P. allenii. Mycologist Paul Stamets suggested in 2005 that it "probably is new, or least a newly imported species". It is commonly called "Psilocybe cyanofriscosa" in the online mycological community, but this name is grammatically incorrect Latin and has never been validly published in scientific literature. The specific epithet allenii honors John W. Allen, who collected the original material and provided the impetus for the study. Allen collected the type material from the University of Washington Campus in November 2009. He first collected the fungus in Capitol Hill in 1982, and several times later from Seattle. Some of these collections he sent to Mexican Psilocybe specialist Gastón Guzmán, who initially thought them to be P. cyanescens because of their overlapping spore size ranges.

== Description ==
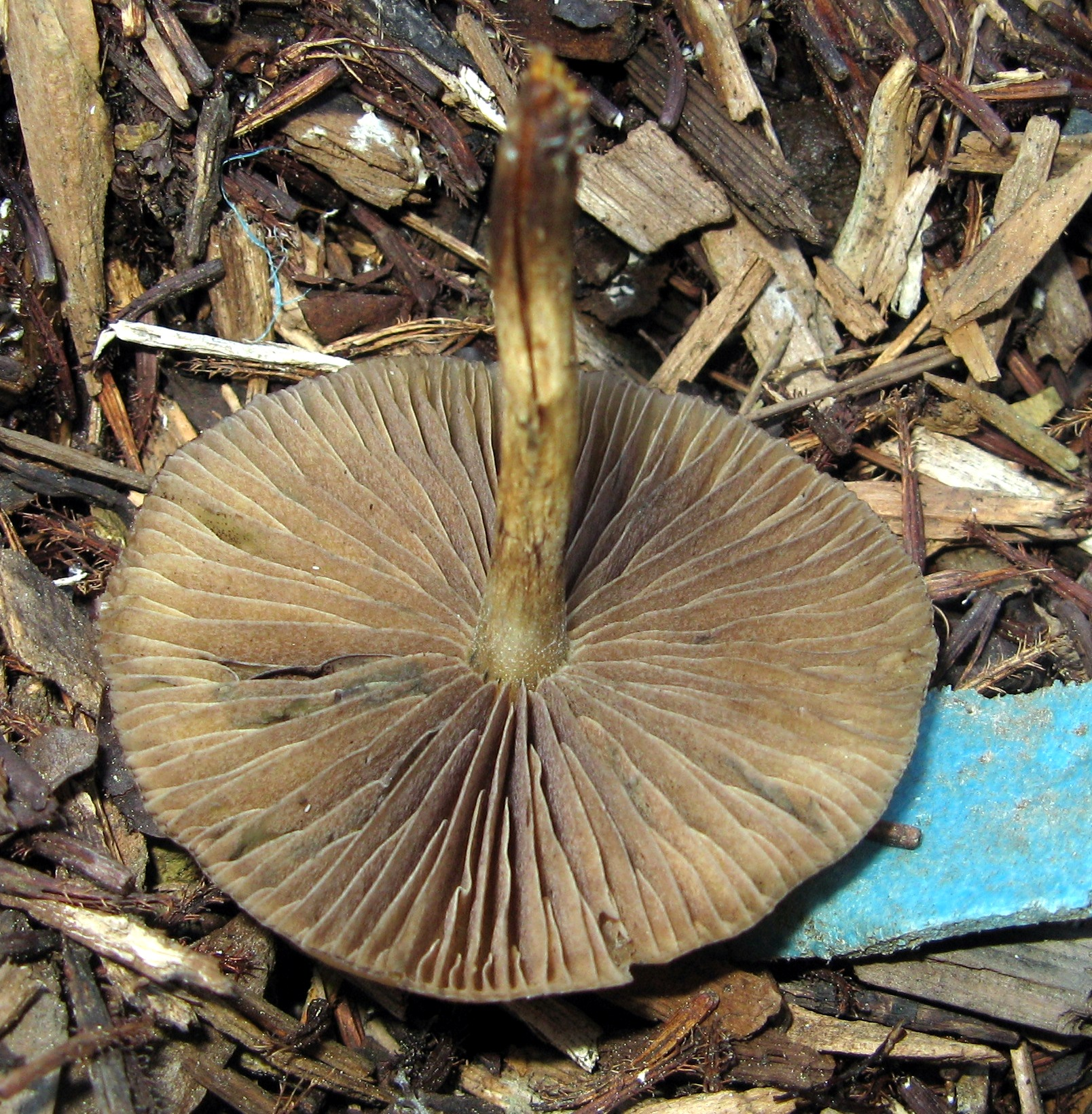
Gills are adnate to sinuate, and become darker as the spores mature.

Fruitbodies of P. allenii are variable in size, depending on the substrate in which they grow. The caps are 1.5–9 cm (0.6–3.5 in) in diameter, and range from broadly convex to flattened, sometimes with a slight depression in the center. The cap margin is either straight and slightly curved inward, rarely slightly wavy, and sometimes has radial grooves in moist specimens. The surface is smooth, sticky when moist, with a gelatinous cap cuticle that can be peeled. Wet fruitbodies are so slippery that they are difficult to collect. Caps are hygrophanous, and so will change color depending on how moist they are. They are pale orange brown to caramel brown when moist, but dry to yellowish-buff. Gills have an adnate to sinuate attachment to the stipe, and are initially cream to pale gray brown, but become dark purple as the spores mature.

The cylindrical, hollow stipe typically measures 4–7 cm (1.6–2.8 in) long by 0.2–0.7 cm (0.1–0.3 in) thick, with the base slightly thicker. The top of the stipe is pruinose (covered with white powdery granules), while the base is connected to thick white rhizomorphs. The stipe surface is smooth to silky fibrillose (as if made of silky, slender fibers), and its color initially white before yellowing slightly in age. Mycelium at the base of the stipe is white or stained blue. All parts of the fruitbody stain blue if bruised or handled. Young specimens have a white partial veil that later disappears, or remains as a zone on the stipe that can be colored purplish brown by spores. The odor and taste of the mushroom is farinaceous—similar to freshly ground flour.

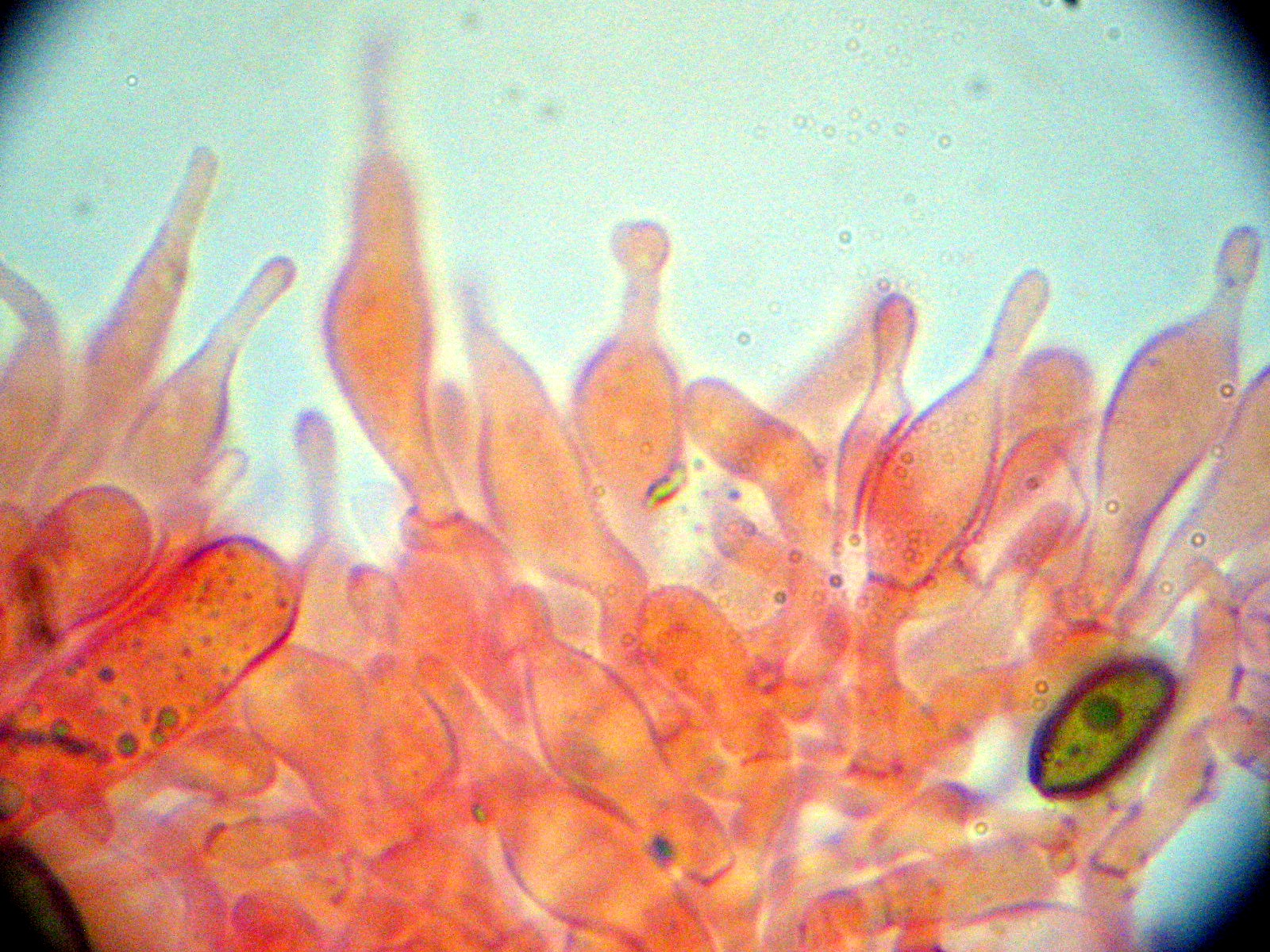
Cystidia have a variable shape.

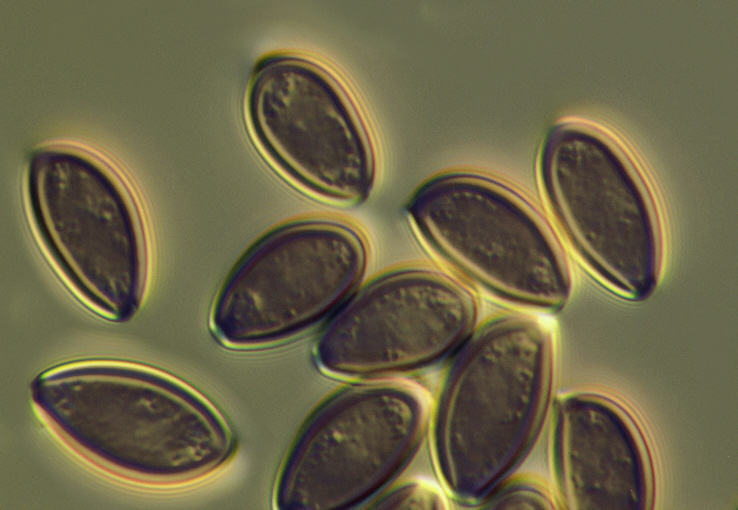
Spores are thick-walled, with an elongated, roughly elliptical shape.

Spore prints are dark brown, sometimes with violet shades. Spores are thick-walled with an apical pore, and elongated ellipsoid to equilateral in face view, and somewhat inequilateral in side view, typically measuring 12.0–12.6–13.1 by 6.8–7.1–7.4 μm. The basidia (spore-bearing cells) are cylindrical, four-spored with sterigmata up to 5.5 μm long, and have dimensions of 27–37 by 9–11 μm. Clamp connections are present in hyphae. Cheilocystidia (cystidia on the gill edge) are abundant. They are hyaline (translucent), thin-walled, and variably shaped, and range from narrow clubs to narrow flasks with a neck no longer than 8 μm; their dimensions are typically 20–30 by 6–8 μm. The pleurocystidia (found on the gill face) are common; they are broadly club-shaped but taper to a point (sometimes with a rounded tip at the end), and measure 25–35 by 9–14 μm. Caulocystidia (found on the stipe) are also present, with variable shapes similar to the cheilo- and pleurocystidia.

The mushrooms are consumed for their psychoactive properties, and have a potency roughly similar to P. cyanescens. Borovička and colleagues say they are "commonly sought out by some mushroom hunters". According to Rockefeller, "If you go to Golden Gate Park in December you will see hundreds of hippies looking at the wood chip landscaping for Psilocybe cyanescens and Psilocybe allenii."

=== Similar species ===
Several Psilocybe species have an appearance roughly similar to P. allenii, but these can usually be distinguished by differences in morphology or distribution. The European species P. serbica var. moravica has a similar cap and stipe, but is generally more slender than P. allenii. The closely related P. cyanescens is indistinguishable by microscopic characteristics, but features a wavy cap in maturity, a longer fruiting season (from late September through April), and lacks a ring zone on the stipe often seen in P. allenii. P. azurescens has a broader cap, an umbo that may be broad or acute, a longer stipe up to 20 cm (7.9 in), and a growing season similar to that of P. cyanescens. The authors also note that the Australian P. subaeruginosa is similar (including two taxa that have since been synonymized: P. australiana and P. eucalypta) but suggest that further research is required to better understand the delimitation of this species complex.

== Habitat and distribution ==
Psilocybe allenii is found in the northwestern North America, with a range extending from British Columbia south to Los Angeles, California. It is most common in areas up to 10 miles (16 km) from the Pacific coast, although it has been collected 100 miles (160 km) inland. Fruitbodies grow scattered, in groups, or (more rarely) in clusters, on woody debris, such as wood chips often used in landscaping. Favored substrates include hardwood mulches made of oak, eucalyptus, Douglas fir, and alder. Fruiting occurs in cold weather, generally from late September to January. The species can be readily cultivated on agar, grain spawn, and cellulosic material, including wood chips and sawdust.

== See also ==
- List of Psilocybe species
- List of psilocybin mushrooms
- Legal status of psilocybin mushrooms
