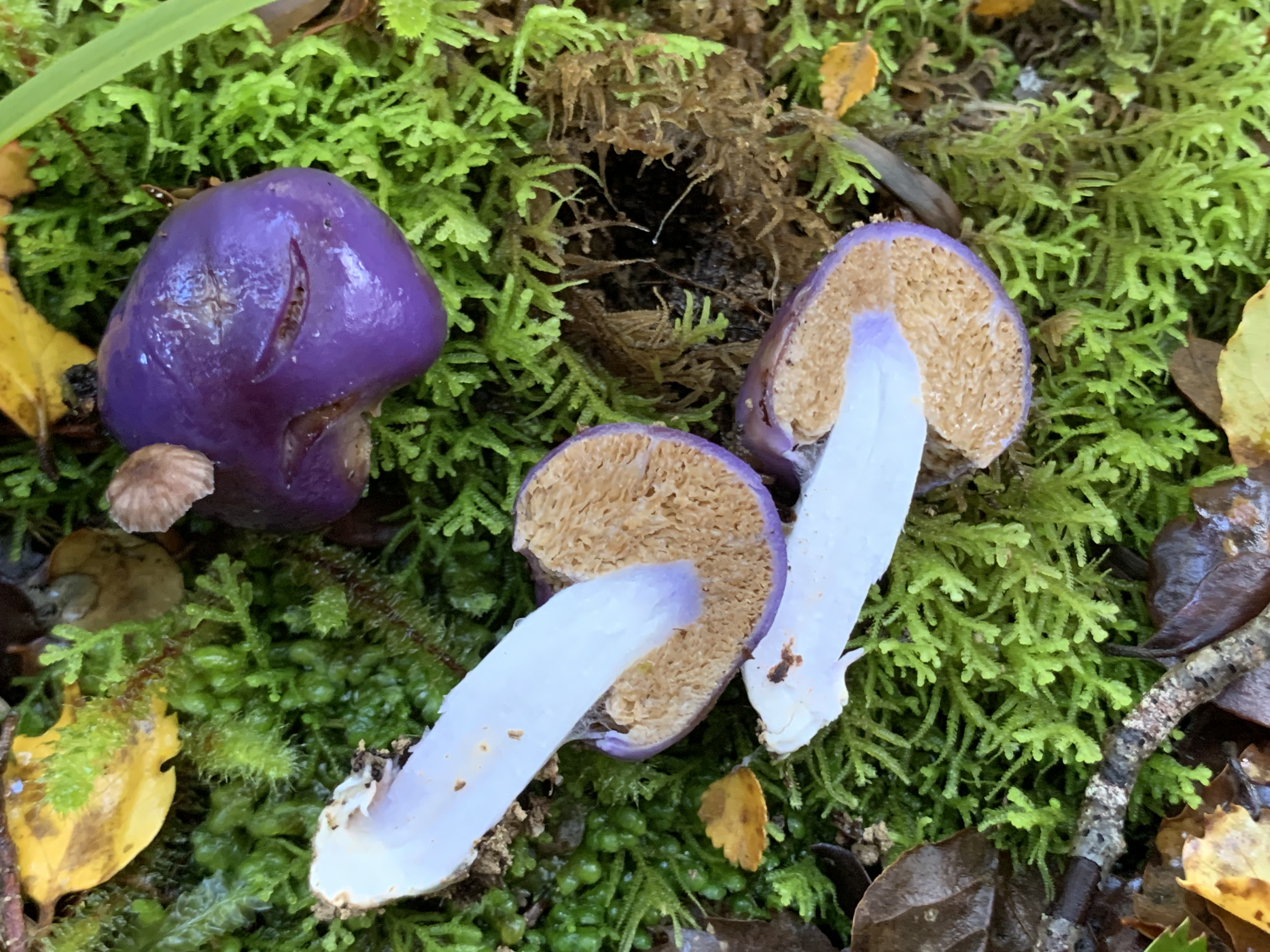

Scientific classification
- Kingdom: Fungi
- Division: Basidiomycota
- Class: Agaricomycetes
- Order: Agaricales
- Family: Cortinariaceae
- Genus: Cortinarius
- Species: C. purpureocapitatus

Binomial name
- Cortinarius purpureocapitatus X. Yue Wang, J.A. Cooper, A.R. Nilsen & Orlovich

= Cortinarius purpureocapitatus =

Species of fungus

Cortinarius purpureocapitatus is a species of purple pouch fungus in the genus Cortinarius. It is endemic to Aotearoa New Zealand.

== Taxonomy ==
The species was described in 2020 by Xinyue Wang, Jerry A Cooper, Andy R Nilsen and David A Orlovich. The holotype specimen was collected on the New Zealand Fungal Foray in 2016 on the Glacier Burn Track in Glenorchy, by New Zealand writer and editor Anna Chinn.

== Description ==
This species produces secotioid fruit bodies. The pileus ranges from 25 to 45 mm in diameter, can be pear-shaped to almost rounded with an incurved margin that is not attached to the stipe at maturity. The pileus is slimy, violet to dark violet, occasionally with a reddish hue, and is not hygrophanous. The gleba is loculate, with the locules (compartments) up to 3 mm long and ellipsoid in shape. There are white to pale violet tramal plates extending almost to the edge of the pileus. The stipe continues into the pileus as a columella. The stipe is 30–90 mm long and 8–14 mm wide, centrally attached, equal to subclavate in shape, white to pale lavender in colour, with a surface that is longitudinally striate, and having a fragile attachment to the sporocarp. The stipe context is white to white with a violaceus sheen especially at the base. The tissue of the cutis and stipe do not show any reaction to the addition of potassium hydroxide. Cortinarius purpureocapitatus is distinguished from the other purple secotioid species in New Zealand by the combination of having tramal plates and smooth spores.

== Habitat and distribution ==
Cortinarius purpureocapitatus occurs in forests and is found in both the North and South Island of New Zealand. It is an ectomycorrhizal fungus, associated with Nothofagus species including red beech (N. fusca), mountain beech (N. cliffortioides) and hard beech (N. truncata).

== Etymology ==
The specific epithet purpureocapitatus derives from the Latin purpureo meaning purple and capitatus meaning head or headed. This refers to the purple colour of the pileus.

== See also ==
- List of Cortinarius species
