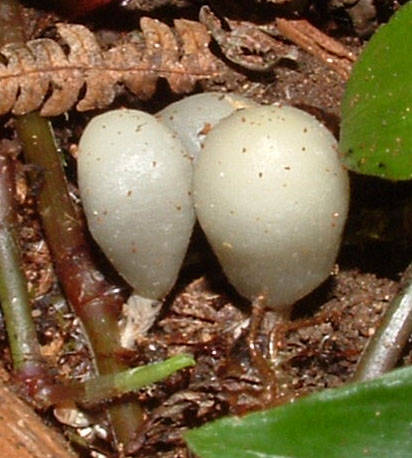

Scientific classification
- Kingdom: Fungi
- Division: Basidiomycota
- Class: Agaricomycetes
- Order: Agaricales
- Family: Hymenogastraceae
- Genus: Psilocybe
- Species: P. weraroa

Binomial name
- Psilocybe weraroa Borovička, Oborník & Noordel. (2011)

Synonyms
- Secotium novae-zelandiae G.Cunn. (1924); Weraroa novae-zelandiae (G.Cunn.) Singer (1958)

= Psilocybe weraroa =

Species of fungus

Psilocybe weraroa
- Mycological characteristics
- Glebal hymenium
- Cap is conical or ovate
- Hymenium attachment is not applicable
- Stipe is bare or has a cortina
- Spore print is purple-brown
- Ecology is saprotrophic
- Edibility is psychoactive

Psilocybe weraroa, formerly Weraroa novae-zelandiae, is a secotioid fungus in the family Hymenogastraceae. It is endemic to New Zealand, where it grows in native forests from rotting wood and woody debris. Despite its pouch-like form this species is closely related to Psilocybe cyanescens and Psilocybe subaeruginosa. As a bluing member of the genus Psilocybe it contains the psychoactive compounds psilocin and psilocybin. It has been cultivated commercially by Rua Bioscience with a view to researching potential medical applications, bringing together Rongoā Māori with the recent interest in Western medicine in the medical applications of psilocin and psilocybin.

== Taxonomy and naming ==
The species was first described in the literature in 1924 by the New Zealand-based mycologist Gordon Heriot Cunningham, under the name Secotium novae-zelandiae. Rolf Singer transferred it to the genus Weraroa in 1958. Phylogenetic analysis by Moncalvo (2002) and Bridge et al. (2008) has demonstrated the close relationship between Weraroa novae-zelandiae and the hallucinogenic blue-staining group of Psilocybe, particularly Psilocybe subaeruginosa. Phylogenetic analysis published by Borovička and colleagues (2011) showed this species is very close to Psilocybe cyanescens. Given this and the apparently distant relation with other species of Weraroa Borovička et al. (2011) suggested renaming the species Psilocybe weraroa. Weraroa has since been adopted as the common name for this species in te reo Māori.

- - - - - P. subaeruginosa "Subs"
        - P. cyanescens "Wavy Caps"
        - P. allenii
        - P. weraroa
        - - P. makarorae
      - - P. cubensis "Magic Mushrooms"
    - P. serbica
  - - - - P. medullosa
      - - P. zapotecorum
        - P. aucklandiae
      - - P. pelliculosa "Conifer Psilocybe"
        - P. alutacea
        - - P. angulospora
          - P. semilanceata "Liberty Caps"
    - P. fuscofulva

Cladogram depicting the phylogeny of P. weraroa and related species of Psilocybe.

=== Etymology ===
The species epithet weraroa is taken from the former generic name, which refers to the type locality. The binomial Psilocybe novae-zelandiae could not be used, as it had been applied to another species in 1978 by Gastón Guzmán and Egon Horak (now Deconica novae-zelandiae).

== Description ==
Pileus (Peridium) 3–5 cm (1.2–2.0 in) long by 1.5–3 cm (0.59–1.18 in) wide, roundish, ovate (wider at the base and tapering towards the end, egg-shaped) or elongated and elliptic (tapered at the base and apex with a swollen mid-section), base decurrent (extending down the stem below the insertion) or rounded and blunt, margin folded and often torn, light brown when young, becoming french-grey or pale blue-grey, sometimes pallid green in age, longitudinally fibrillose causing a finely striated appearance, becoming smooth, polished, glabrous, tacky and leathery in age, slowly bruising blue or greenish when injured, drying yellow to dingy brown. Stipe up to 40 mm (1.6 in) long by 6 mm (0.24 in) in diameter, slender, equal in width, whitish to french-grey, bruising blue or greenish with damage, yellowish-brown at the base, initially fibrillose but becoming smooth, polished and cartilaginous in age excluding at the base, hollow, flesh yellow-orange, thickening at the internal apex. Gleba sepia-brown to chocolate-brown, cellular, coarsely shaped, often elongated, laterally compressed, sparse, chambered and gill-like. Spores 11–15(17) x 5–8 μm in size, smooth, sepia-coloured to purple-brown, elliptic-ovate or elliptical in shape, rounded at one end with a thin epispore.

== Habitat and distribution ==
The species is endemic to New Zealand, and is fairly abundant in the early winter and spring months in lowland mixed rainforest near Wellington and Auckland. The mushroom can be difficult to see, often buried under leaves or eaten by slugs, and it is sometimes hard to find mature specimens that are not partially eaten. The species is typically found on decaying wood buried in forest leaf litter (either solitary or crowded), often on the rotting branches of māhoe (Melicytus ramiflorus). It has also been found fruiting on rotted cabbage trees (Cordyline australis) and associated with decaying tree-fern fronds, native to the forests of New Zealand.

== Similar species ==
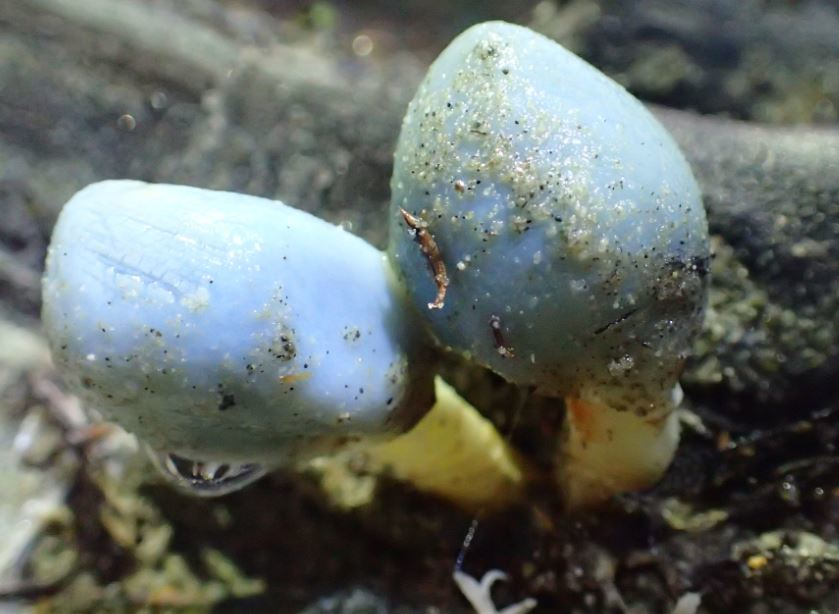
Clavogaster virescens, a close lookalike often mistaken for P. weraroa by foragers.

Clavogaster virescens is similar in appearance and habitat, but the gleba form a reddish brown chambered mass enclosed inside a sack-like structure within the peridium. The stem is stout, smooth and slippery rather than fibrous, off-white to yellow, enlarged at the top where it often smoothly transitions into the pouch, and tapering towards a yellower base. The fungus does not have a bluing reaction; it is naturally blue to greenish blue, and has no psychoactive properties.

== Ecology ==
A hypothesis for the species' development of pouches is that it evolved as a strategy to be eaten by the flightless extinct moa, disguising the fruitbodies of the fungus as fallen berries, in order for the spores to be disbursed into new areas.

== Gallery ==
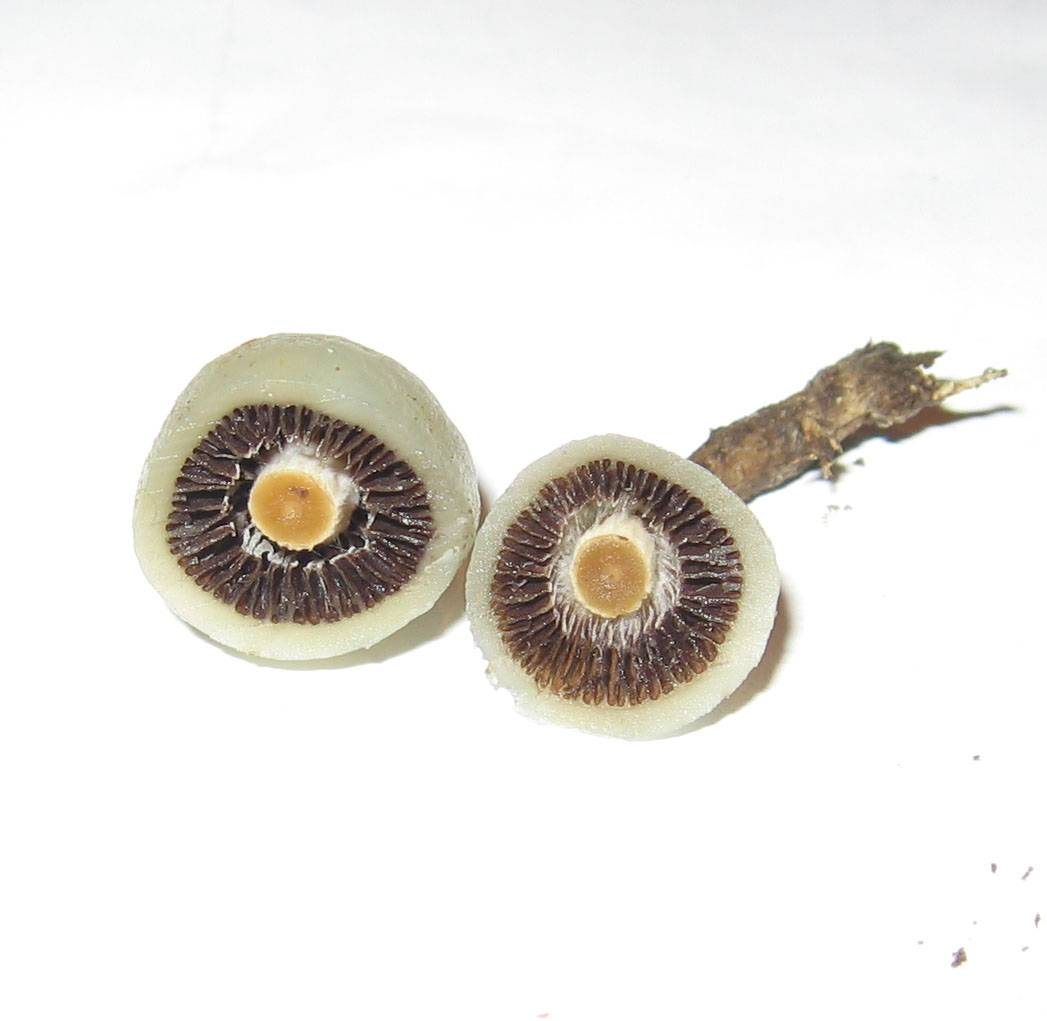
A cross-section of the basidiocarp.

Fruitbodies.

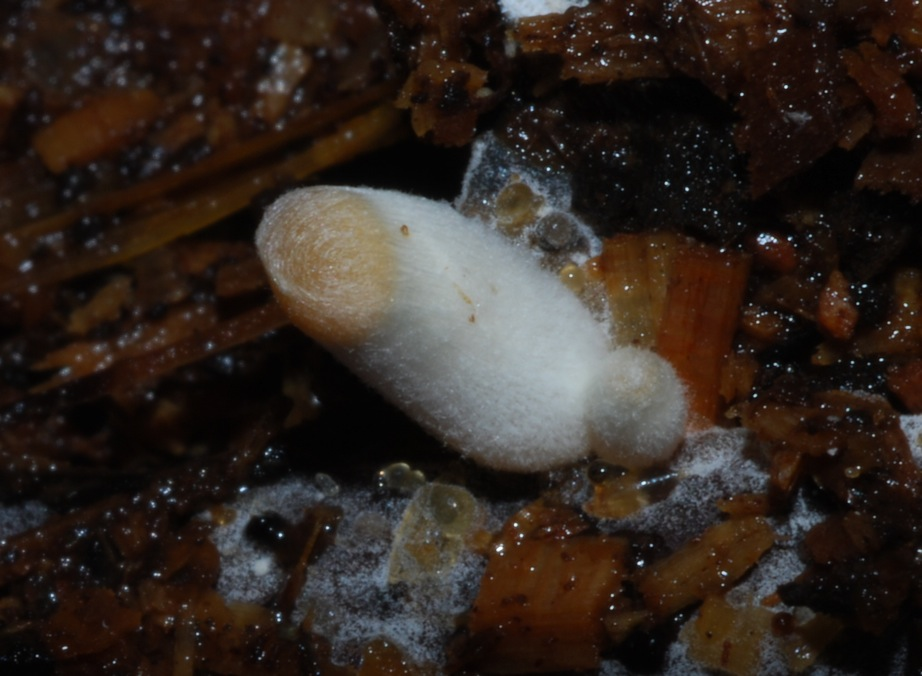
Young specimen

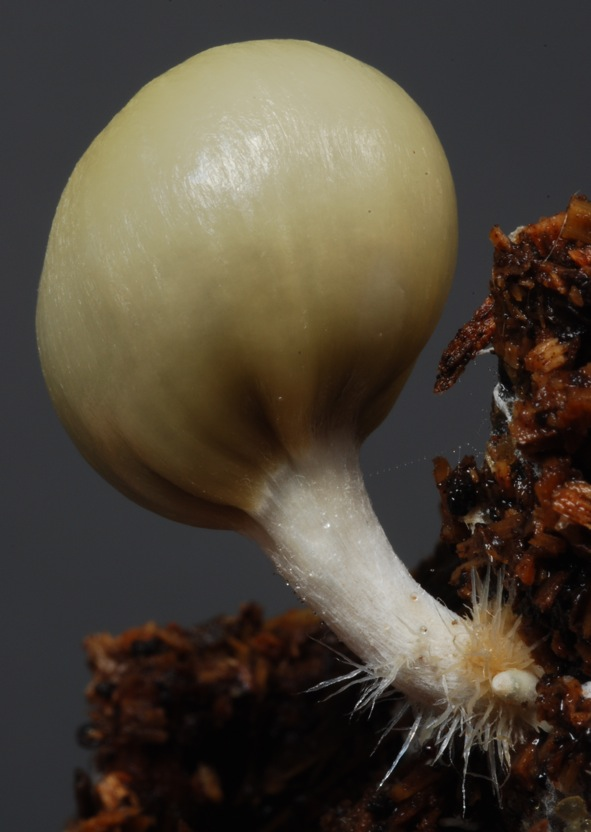
The same specimen as above after three days

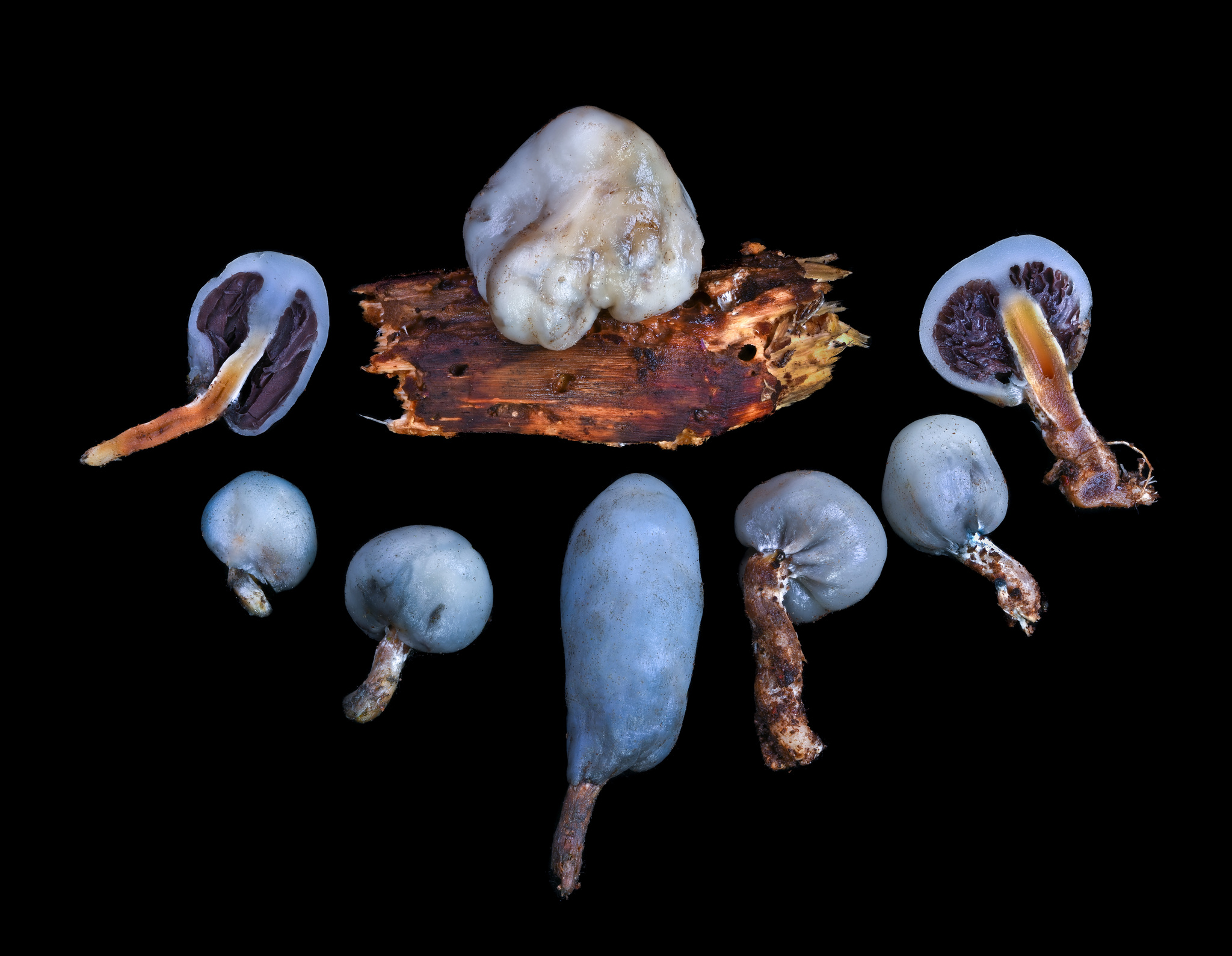
A selection of fruiting bodies
