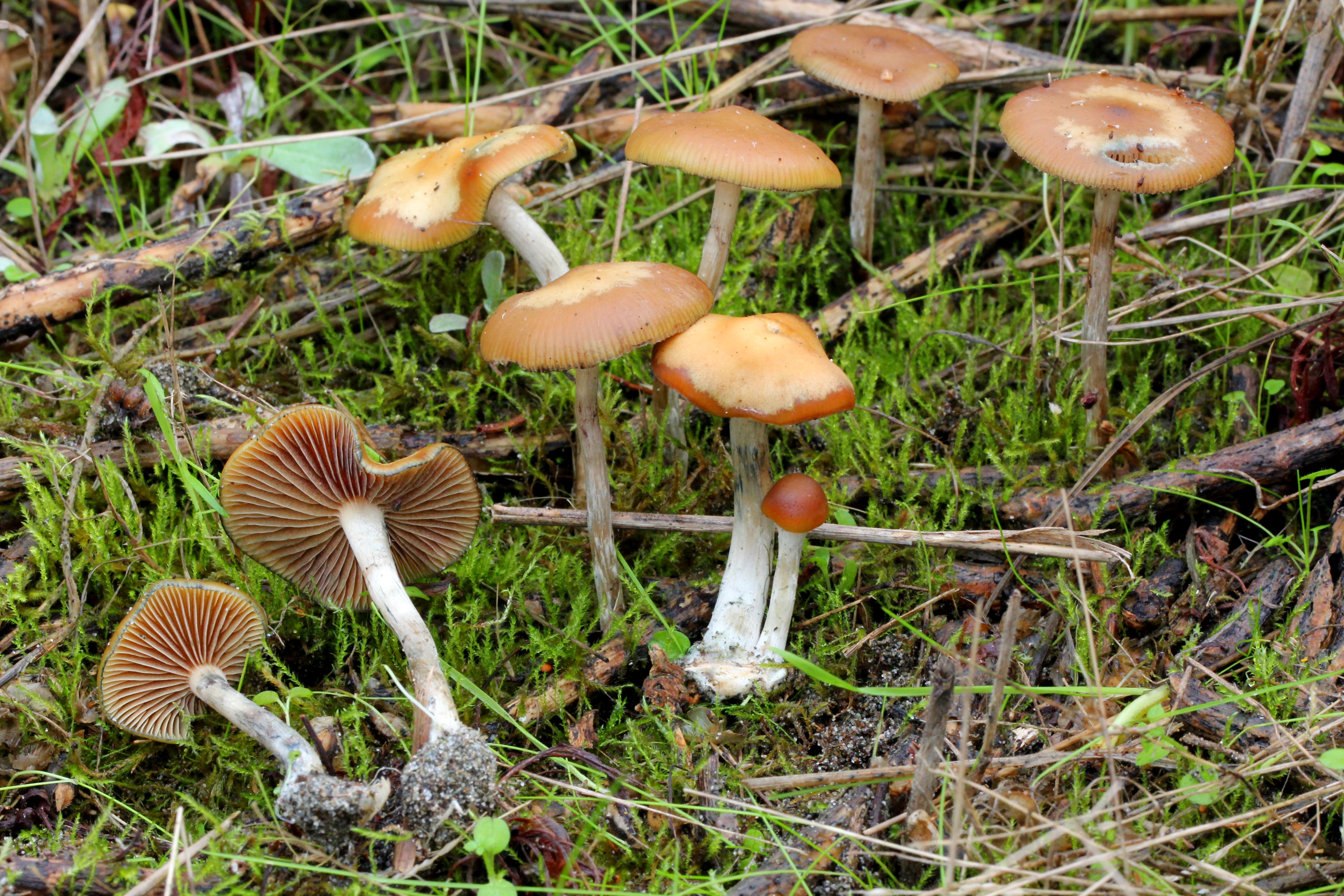

Scientific classification
- Kingdom: Fungi
- Division: Basidiomycota
- Class: Agaricomycetes
- Order: Agaricales
- Family: Hymenogastraceae
- Genus: Psilocybe
- Species: P. cyanescens

Binomial name
- Psilocybe cyanescens Wakefield

= Psilocybe cyanescens =

Species of fungus

Psilocybe cyanescens
- Mycological characteristics
- Gills on hymenium
- Cap is umbonate
- Hymenium is adnate or subdecurrent
- Stipe is bare
- Spore print is blackish-brown to purple
- Ecology is saprotrophic
- Edibility is psychoactive

Psilocybe cyanescens, commonly known as the wavy cap or potent psilocybe, is a species of potent psychedelic mushroom. The main compounds responsible for its psychedelic effects are psilocybin and psilocin. It belongs to the family Hymenogastraceae. A formal description of the species was published by Elsie Wakefield in 1946 in the Transactions of the British Mycological Society, based on a specimen she had recently collected at Kew Gardens. She had begun collecting the species as early as 1910. The mushroom is not generally regarded as being physically dangerous to adults.

Psilocybe cyanescens can sometimes fruit in colossal quantities; more than 100,000 individual mushrooms were found growing in a single patch at a racetrack in England.

== Description ==
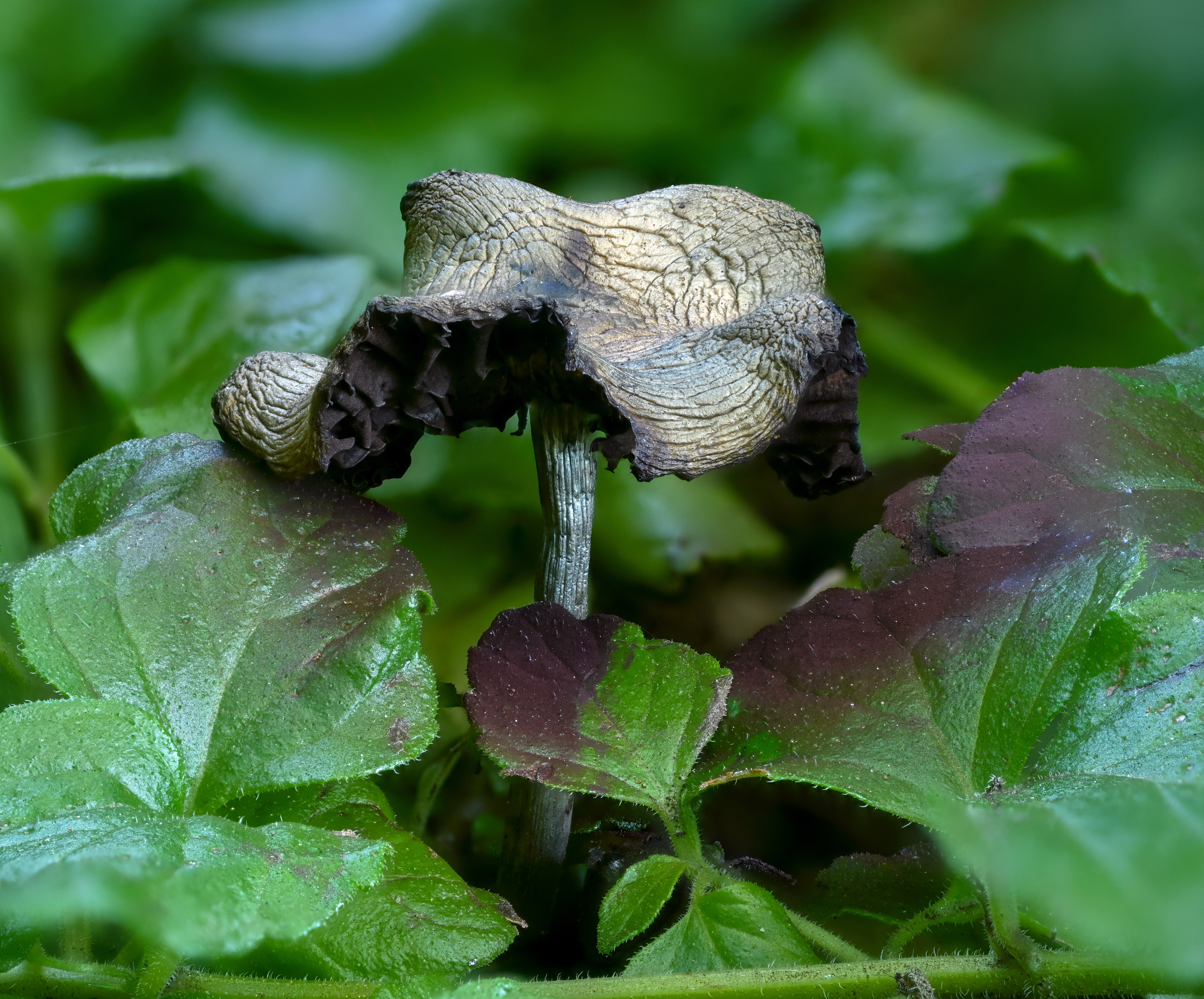
Dry P. cyanescens with spore deposit

Psilocybe cyanescens has a hygrophanous pileus (cap) that is caramel to chestnut-brown when moist, fading to pale buff or slightly yellowish when dried. Caps generally measure from 1.5–5 cm (1/2–2 in) across, and are normally distinctly wavy in maturity. The color of the pileus is rarely seen in mushrooms outside of the P. cyanescens species complex. Most parts of the mushroom, including the cap and Lamellae (gills, underneath the cap) can stain blue when touched or otherwise disturbed, due to the oxidation of psilocin. The lamellae are adnate, and light brown to dark purple brown in maturity, with lighter gill edges. There is no distinct annulus, but immature P. cyanescens specimens do have a cobwebby veil which may leave an annular zone in maturity. Both the odor and taste are farinaceous.

P. cyanescens has elliptical spores which measure 9–12 x 5–8 μm. According to some authors, the holotype collection of the species from Kew Gardens featured no pleurocystidia, but North American collections are characterized by common clavate-mucronate pleurocystidia. However, pleurocystidia are present in the holotype collection (but not easy to observe since hymenium is collapsed). In European collections of P. cyanescens, pleurocystidia are common and their shape is identical to those known from the United States. In 2012, an epitype from Hamburg, Germany was designated.

Fresh sporocarps and mycelia of P. cyanescens generally bruise blueish or blue-green where damaged, and the staining remains visible after drying. This staining is most noticeable on the stem (which is white when undisturbed) but can also occur on other parts of the mushroom, including the gills, cap, and mycelium. This staining is due primarily to the oxidation of psilocin. (Psilocybin cannot be oxidized directly, but is quickly converted via enzymatic action to psilocin at injury sites which can then be oxidized, so even specimens with little psilocin still generally stain blue.)

=== Related species ===
Other related species may include P. weraroa, and these relatives are collectively referred to as the "Psilocybe cyanescens complex" or as the "caramel-capped psilocybe complex," due to their extremely similar appearance and habit. There is phylogenetic evidence that there are two distinct clades in the complex, one consisting of P. cyanescens and P. azurescens and allies, and the other consisting of P. serbica and allies (European taxa). It has also been shown that Psilocybe weraroa (previously known as Weraroa novae-zelandiae) is very closely related to P. cyanescens despite its vastly dissimilar appearance.

A very close relative of P. cyanescens is Psilocybe allenii (described in 2012), formerly known informally as Psilocybe "cyanofriscosa" (nom. inval.), a mushroom found in California and Washington It can be distinguished by macromorphological features and/or sequencing of rDNA ITS molecular marker.

It is often difficult or impossible to distinguish between members of the P. cyanescens complex except by range without resorting to microscopic or molecular characters.

Although not closely related, P. cyanescens has been at least occasionally confused with Galerina marginata with fatal results. The two mushrooms have generally similar habits and appearances, and bear a superficial resemblance to each other such that inexperienced mushroom-seekers may confuse the two. The two species can grow side-by-side, which may add to the chance of confusion. The two mushrooms have different colored spores, making a spore print essential to proper identification.

== Habitat and distribution ==
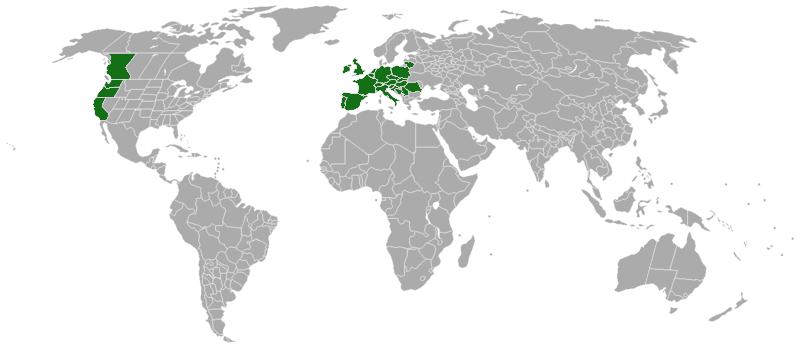
Approximate known range of P. cyanescens

Psilocybe cyanescens grows today primarily on wood chips, especially in and along the perimeter of mulched plant beds in urban areas, but can also grow on other lignin-rich substrates. P. cyanescens does not grow on substrate that is not lignin-rich. Fruitings have been reported in natural settings previously (although most appear to be migrations from mulched plant beds.) The species does not typically grow on mulch that is made from bark.

In the United States, P. cyanescens occurs mainly in the Pacific Northwest, stretching south to the San Francisco Bay Area. It can also be found in areas such as New Zealand, Western Europe, Central Europe, and parts of west Asia (Iran). The range in which P. cyanescens occurs is rapidly expanding, especially in areas where it is not native as the use of mulch to control weeds has been popularized. This rapid expansion of range may be due in part to the simple expedient of P. cyanescens mycelium having colonized the distribution network of woodchip suppliers and thus being distributed on a large scale with commercial mulch. It has been documented to fruit in Spring on the East Coast of the United States.

Although it has been speculated that P. cyanescens' native habitat is the coniferous woodlands of the north-western United States or coastal dunes in the PNW, and the type specimen was described from mulch beds in Kew Gardens, the natural distribution of P. cyanescens in the wild remains unknown.

Fruiting is dependent on a drop in temperature. In the San Francisco Bay Area, this means that fruiting typically occurs between late October and February, and fruiting in other areas generally occurs in fall, when temperatures are between 10–18 °C (50–64 °F).

Psilocybe cyanescens often fruits gregariously or in cespitose clusters, sometimes in great numbers. 100,000 P. cyanescens fruits were once found growing on a racetrack in the south of England. Solitary fruits are sometimes also found.

== Indole content ==
The fruits of P. cyanescens have been shown to contain many different indole alkaloids including psilocybin, psilocin, and baeocystin. It has also been shown that P. cyanescens mycelium will contain detectable levels of psilocin and psilocybin, but only after the formation of primordia.

Indole content has been shown to be higher in North American specimens of P. cyanescens than in European ones. This was, however, caused by the fact that Gartz did not analyze the genuine P. cyanescens but P. serbica.

North American fruiting bodies of P. cyanescens have been shown to have between 0.66% and 1.96% total indole content by dry weight. European fruiting bodies have been shown to have between 0.39% and 0.75% total indole content by dry weight.

North American specimens of P. cyanescens are among the most potent of psychedelic mushrooms. Its potency means that it is widely sought after by users of recreational drugs in those areas where it grows naturally.

== Cultivation ==
Fruiting begins with simulation of a fall environment at temperatures between 10–18 °C (50–64 °F).

Psilocybe cyanescens, like many other psilocybin containing mushrooms, is sometimes cultivated. Due to the fruiting requirements of the species, it is challenging but possible to get P. cyanescens to produce fruits indoors. Outdoor cultivation in an appropriate climate is relatively easy. Yield per pound of substrate is low when compared to other psilocybin containing mushrooms for both indoor and outdoor cultivation. The combination of poor yield and difficulty may explain why P. cyanescens is grown less frequently than some other psilocybin containing mushrooms.

Psilocybe cyanescens mycelium is easier to grow than actual fruits are, can be grown indoors, and is robust enough that it can be transplanted in order to start new patches. Mycelium can also be propagated via stem butt transplantation. Many of the cultivation techniques used with other members of the genus Psilocybe can be used to grow P. cyanescens as well. Cultivated P. cyanescens contain approximately the same concentration of psilocin and psilocybin as natural examples do.

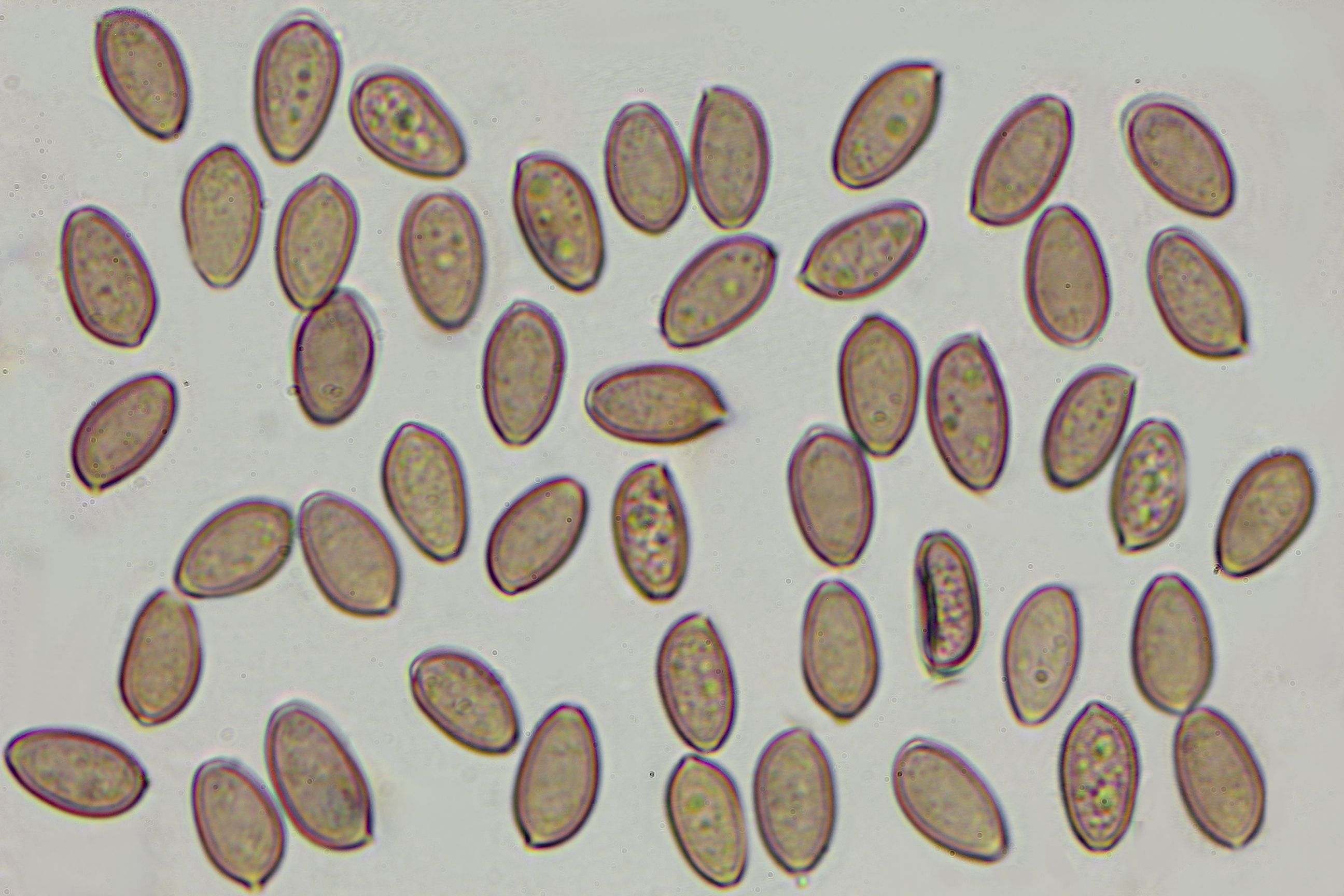
Psilocybe cyanescens spores

== Legal status ==
Psilocybe cyanescens specimens do not fall under the Convention on Psychotropic Substances because the convention does not cover naturally occurring plants or fungi that incidentally contain a scheduled drug. However, many countries choose to prohibit possession of psilocybin containing mushrooms, including P. cyanescens, under their domestic laws.

Countries that have banned or severely regulated the possession of P. cyanescens include the United States, Germany, New Zealand, and many others. Although this is difficult to enforce since no species of Psilocybe mushroom has spores containing psilocybin or psilocin. Because of this, P. cyanescens spores are not illegal to possess in many US states. (It is illegal to possess spores in Georgia and Idaho, and illegal to possess them with the intent to produce mushrooms in California.)

== Gallery ==
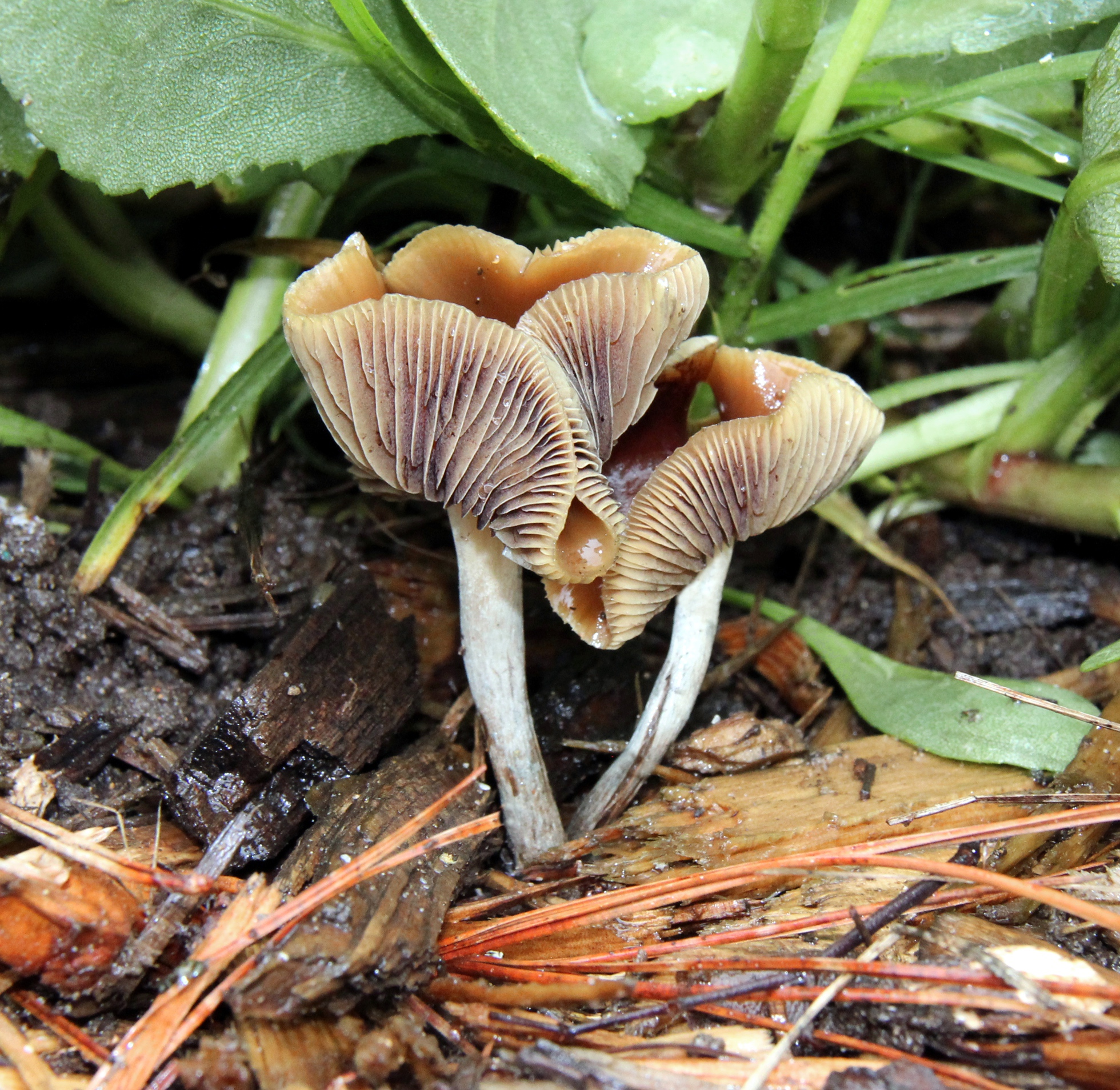

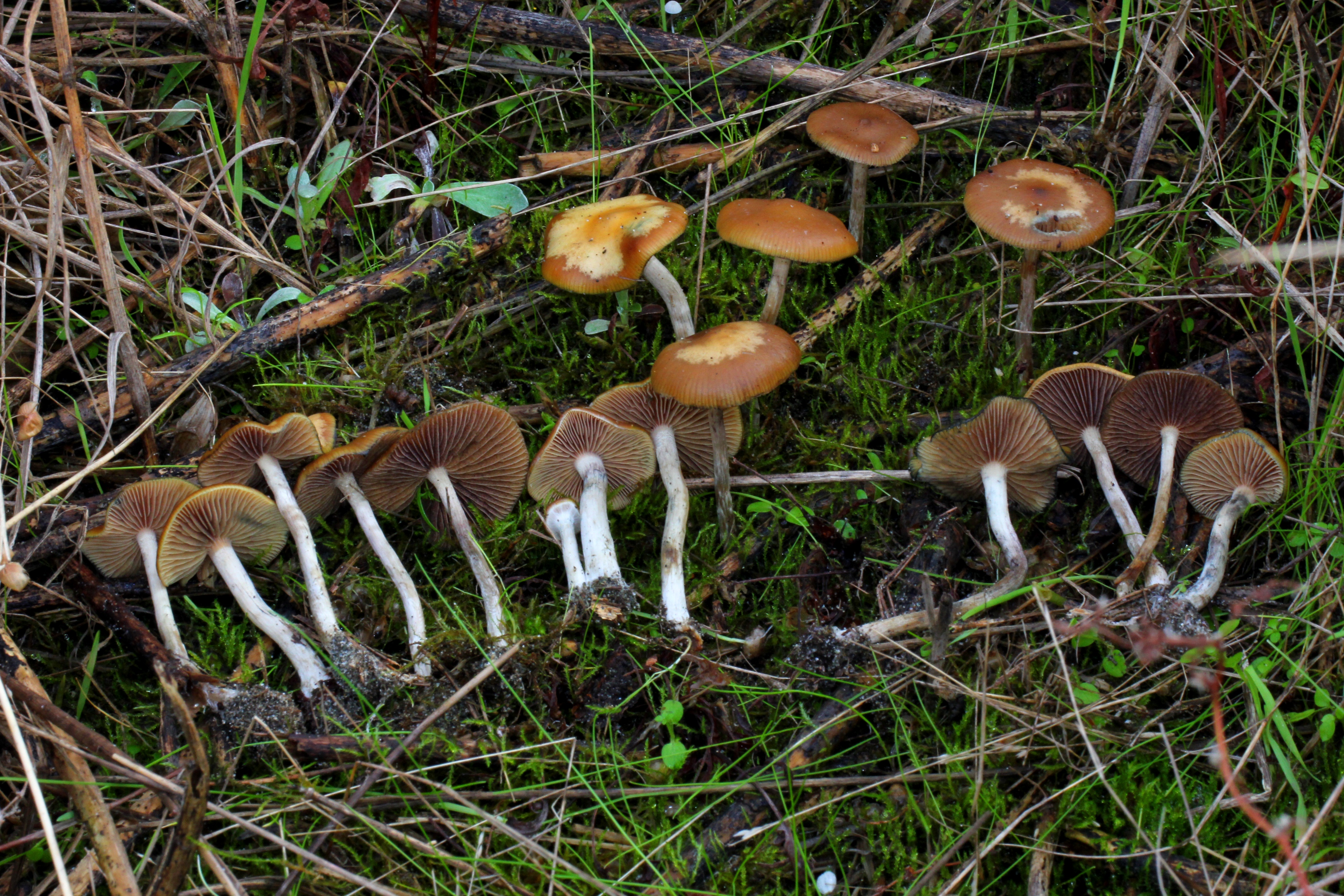

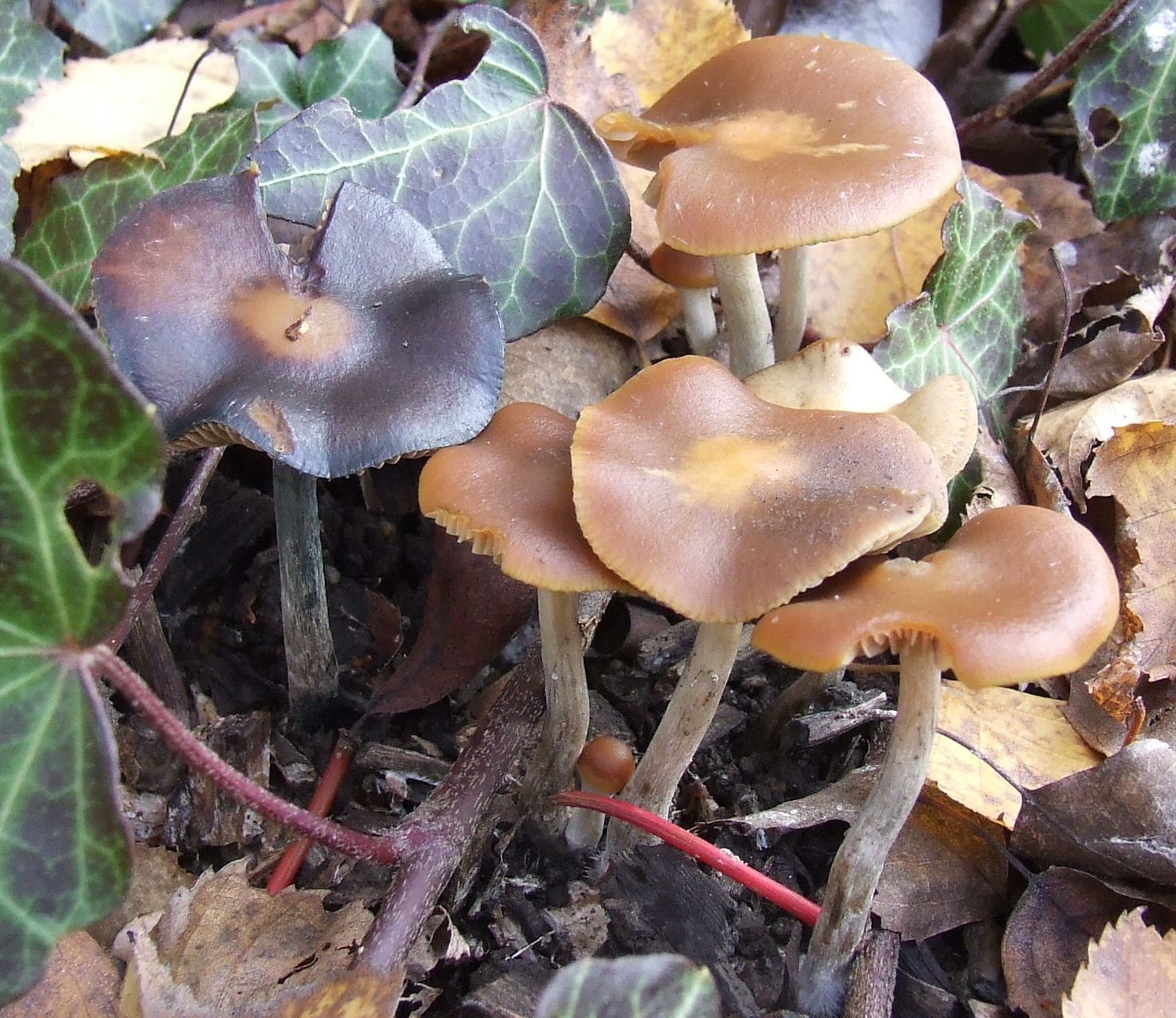

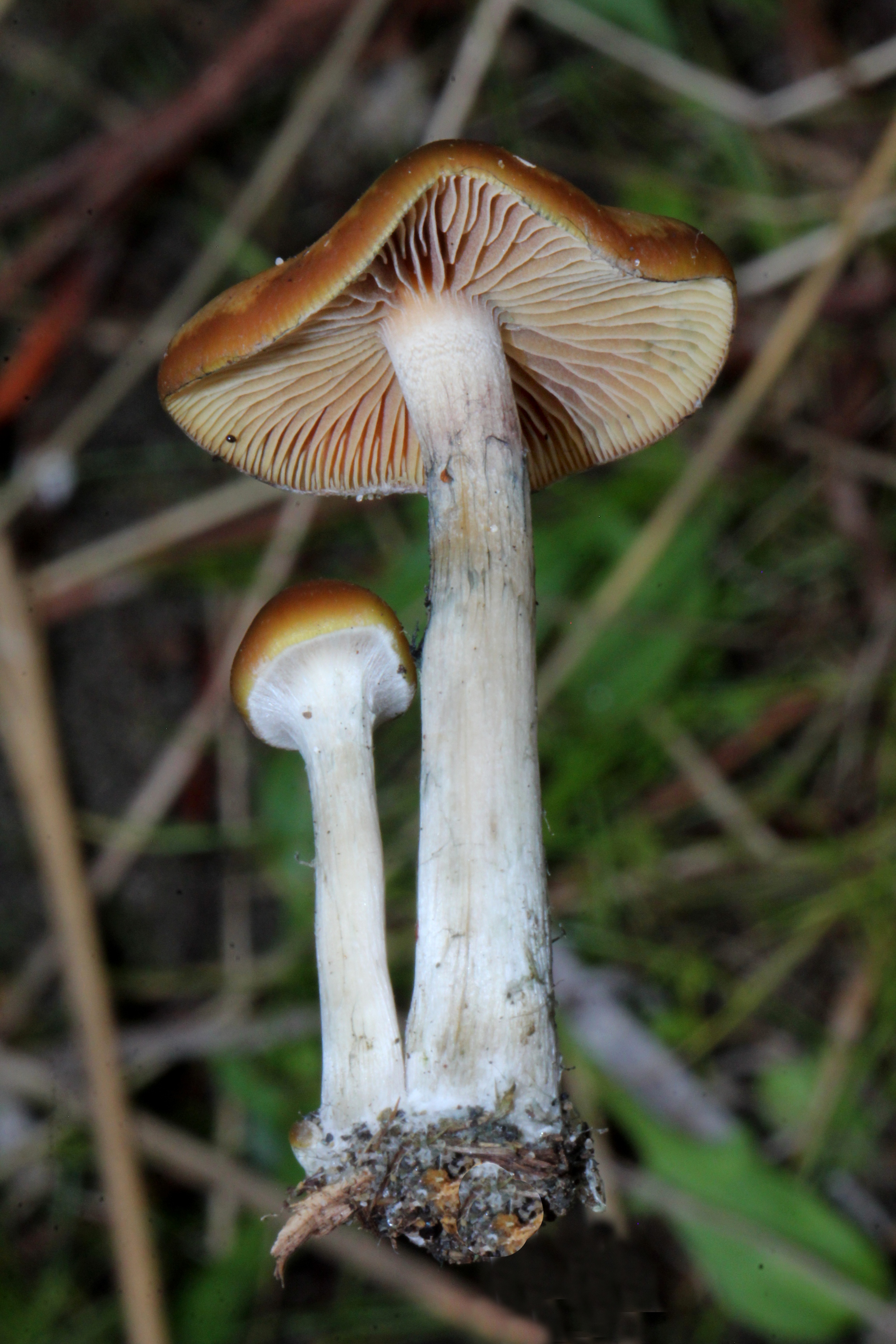

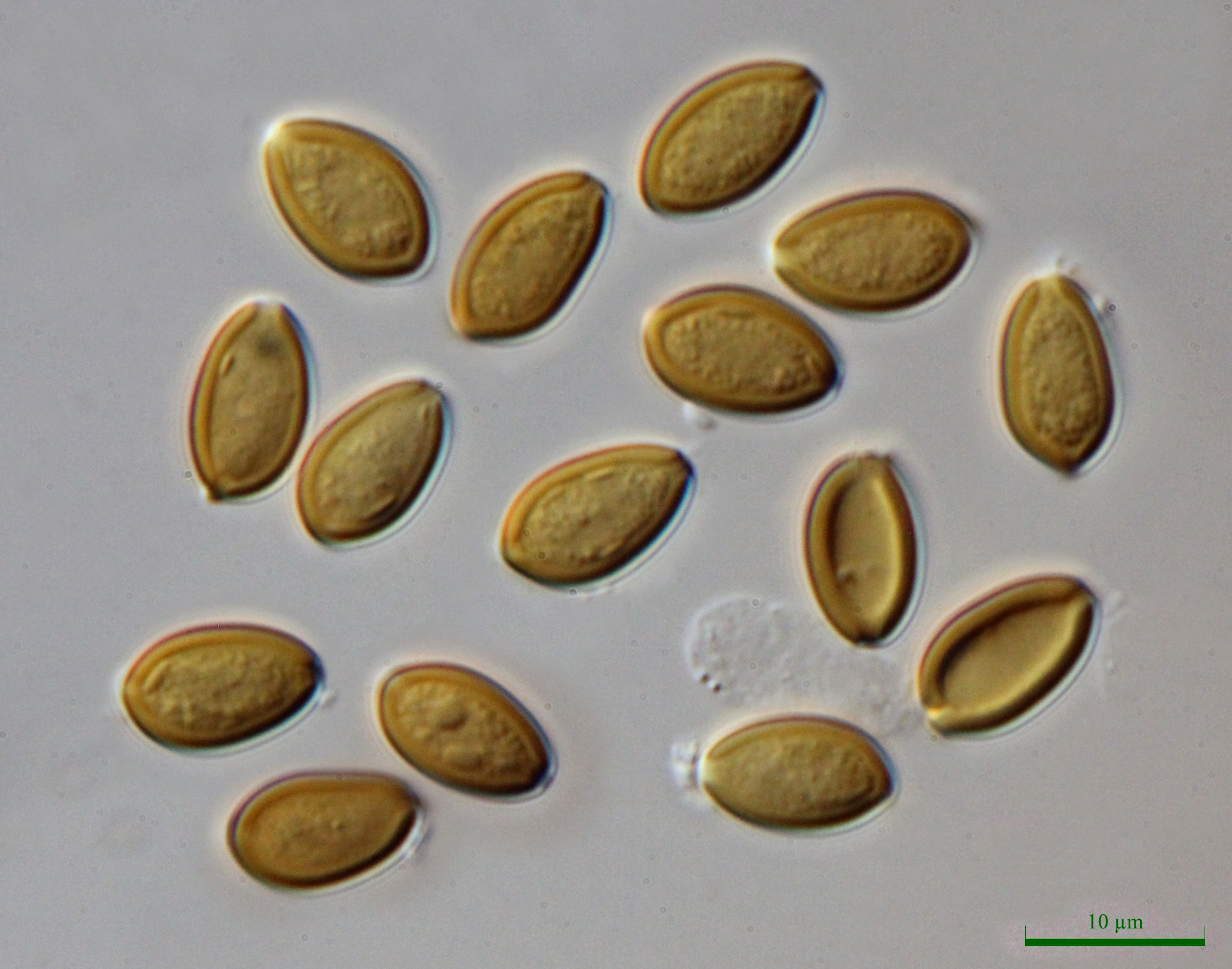
