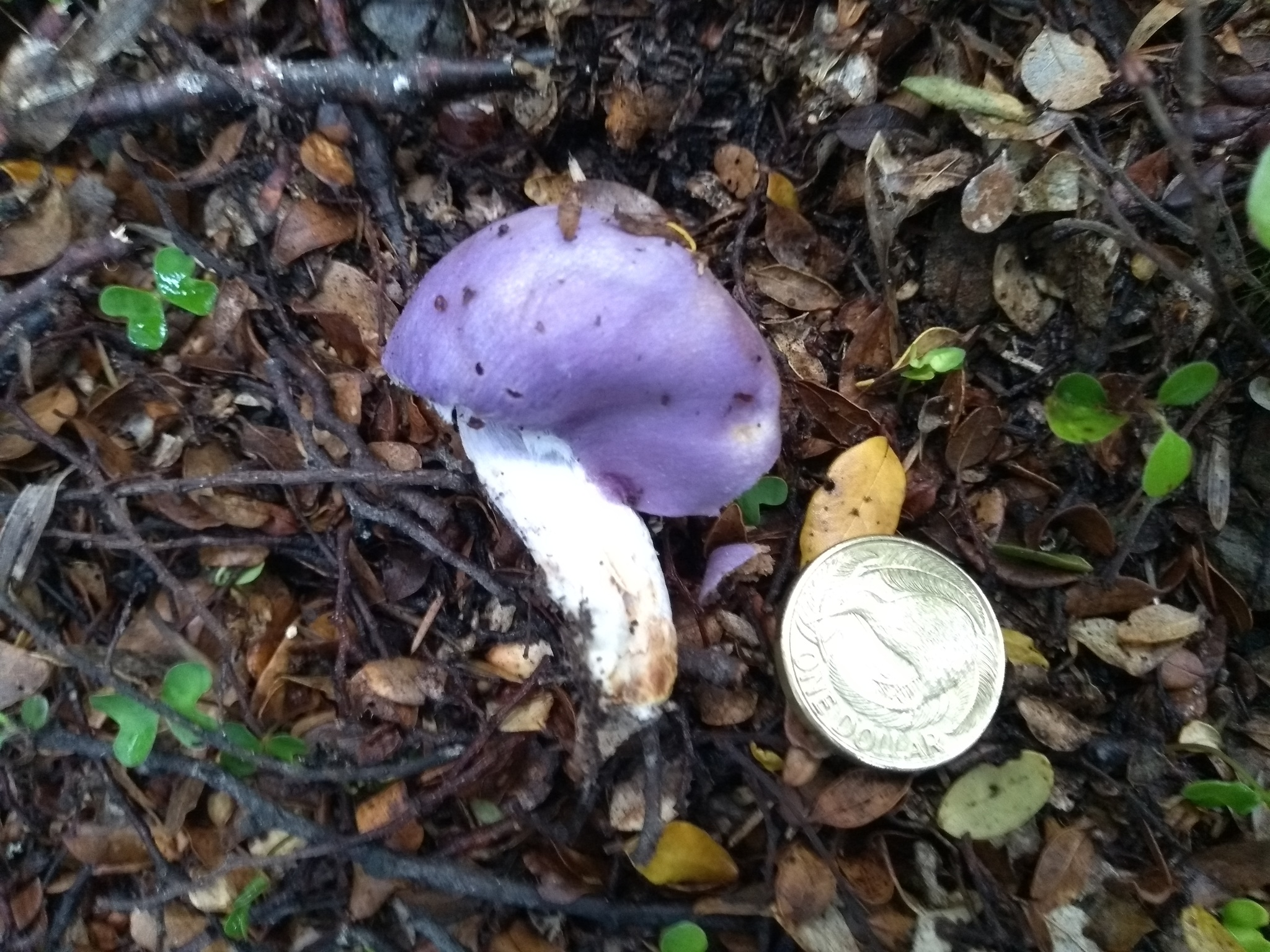

Scientific classification
- Domain: Eukaryota
- Kingdom: Fungi
- Division: Basidiomycota
- Class: Agaricomycetes
- Order: Agaricales
- Family: Cortinariaceae
- Genus: Cortinarius
- Species: C. porphyroideus

Binomial name
- Cortinarius porphyroideus (G.Cunn.) Peintner & M.M.Moser (2002)

Synonyms
- Secotium porphyreum G.Cunn. (1924); Thaxterogaster porphyreus (G.Cunn.) Singer (1954)

= Cortinarius porphyroideus =

Species of fungus

Cortinarius porphyroideus, commonly known as purple pouch fungus, is a secotioid species of fungus endemic to New Zealand. It was one of six species that appeared as part of a series depicting native New Zealand fungi on stamps, released in 2002.

== Taxonomy ==
The species was originally described in 1924 by Gordon Herriot Cunningham as Secotium porphyreum, from collections made in Wellington. In 1954 Rolf Singer transferred it to Thaxterogaster when he erected that genus to contain species with Cortinarius-like spores that had a reduced stipe and gills that were only partially exposed, or the hymenium was loculate (divided into small cavities or compartments). It acquired its current name in 2002 when molecular studies demonstrated that Thaxterogaster was polyphyletic and nested within Cortinarius. In an article recommending English language common names for several endemic New Zealand fungi, Geoff Ridley proposes the name "king's pouch". The name was widely applied to many of the New Zealand purple secotioid Cortinarius species but molecular phylogenetic analysis in 2020 indicated that these comprised at least 6 unrelated species. Cortinarius porphyroideus is in Section Dulciolentes, and is most closely related to another New Zealand endemic secotioid species Cortinarius pisciodorus, and these are in turn are related to the New Zealand endemic agaricoid species Cortinarius atropileatus.

== Description ==
The violet fruit bodies can grow to a height and width of 7 cm (2.8 in). The smooth, polished surface of the peridium is sticky. When dry, the peridium becomes brown and develops wrinkles. The stout stipe is a pale violet colour with yellow tints at the base. It measures 3–9 cm (1.2–3.5 in) long by 1–2 cm (0.4–0.8 in) thick at the base and tapers towards the top. The texture of the stipe surface is fibrillose (as if made of fibers), and minute grooves can be seen running up and down its length. The interior of the peridium, the gleba, is pale reddish brown in colour and labyrinthiform (with complicated sinuous lines or winding passages) in form. Individual cells or compartments in the gleba are typically 1–2 mm long with thick partitions. Young fruit bodies that are still beneath the earth are white; as they mature and emerge from the ground, the exposure to light causes the color to change to violet.

In deposit, the spores are chestnut brown. Microscopic examination reveals that they are egg-shaped with one end rounded and the other end pointed, measuring 12–17 by 8–11 μm. The spore surface is covered with minute wart-like outgrowths.

== Habitat and distribution ==
Cortinarius porphyroideus is an ectomycorrhizal fungus, associated with hard beech (Nothofagus truncata) and black beech (Nothofagus solandri). The species has a highly restricted distribution, known only from East Harbour Regional Park in Lower Hutt, Wellington Region of Aotearoa New Zealand.

== See also ==
- List of Cortinarius species
