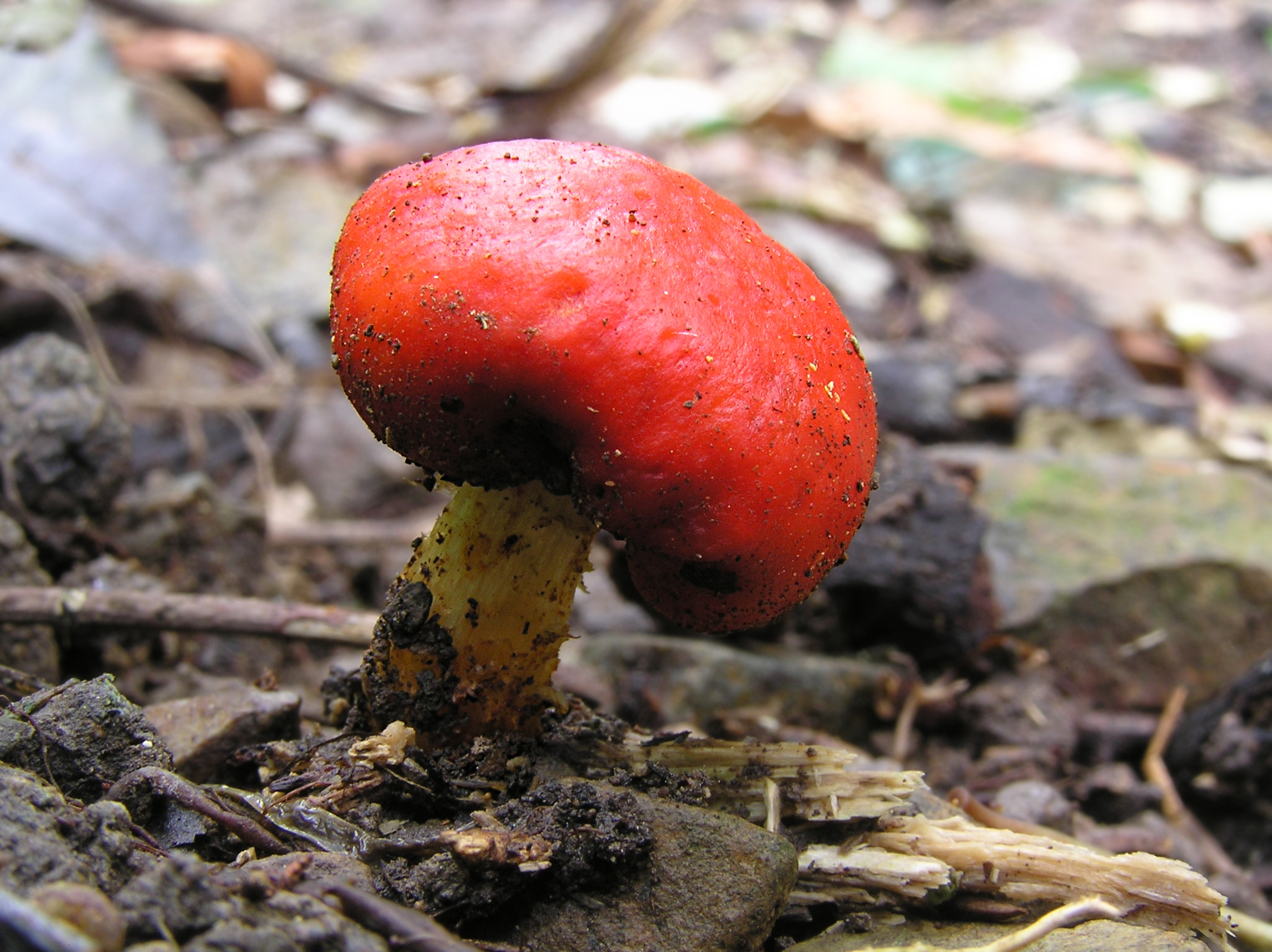

Scientific classification
- Kingdom: Fungi
- Division: Basidiomycota
- Class: Agaricomycetes
- Order: Agaricales
- Family: Strophariaceae
- Genus: Leratiomyces
- Species: L. erythrocephalus

Binomial name
- Leratiomyces erythrocephalus (Tul. & C. Tul.) Beever & D.-C. Park

Synonyms
- Clavogaster erythrocephalus (Tul. & C. Tul.) Lintott; Secotium erythrocephalum Tul. Secotium lutescens Lloyd; Weraroa erythrocephala (Tul. & C. Tul.) Singer & A.H. Sm.

= Leratiomyces erythrocephalus =

Species of fungus

Leratiomyces erythrocephalus
- Mycological characteristics
- Glebal hymenium
- Cap is convex
- Hymenium attachment is not applicable
- Stipe is bare
- Spore print is white
- Ecology is saprotrophic
- Edibility is unknown

Leratiomyces erythrocephalus, commonly known as the red pouch fungus, is a species of secotioid fungi in the family Strophariaceae. First described scientifically as Secotium erythrocephalum by Louis René Tulasne in 1845 and later transferred to Weraroa by American mycologists Rolf Singer and Alexander H. Smith in 1958, it was given its current name in 2008. It is found in New Zealand.

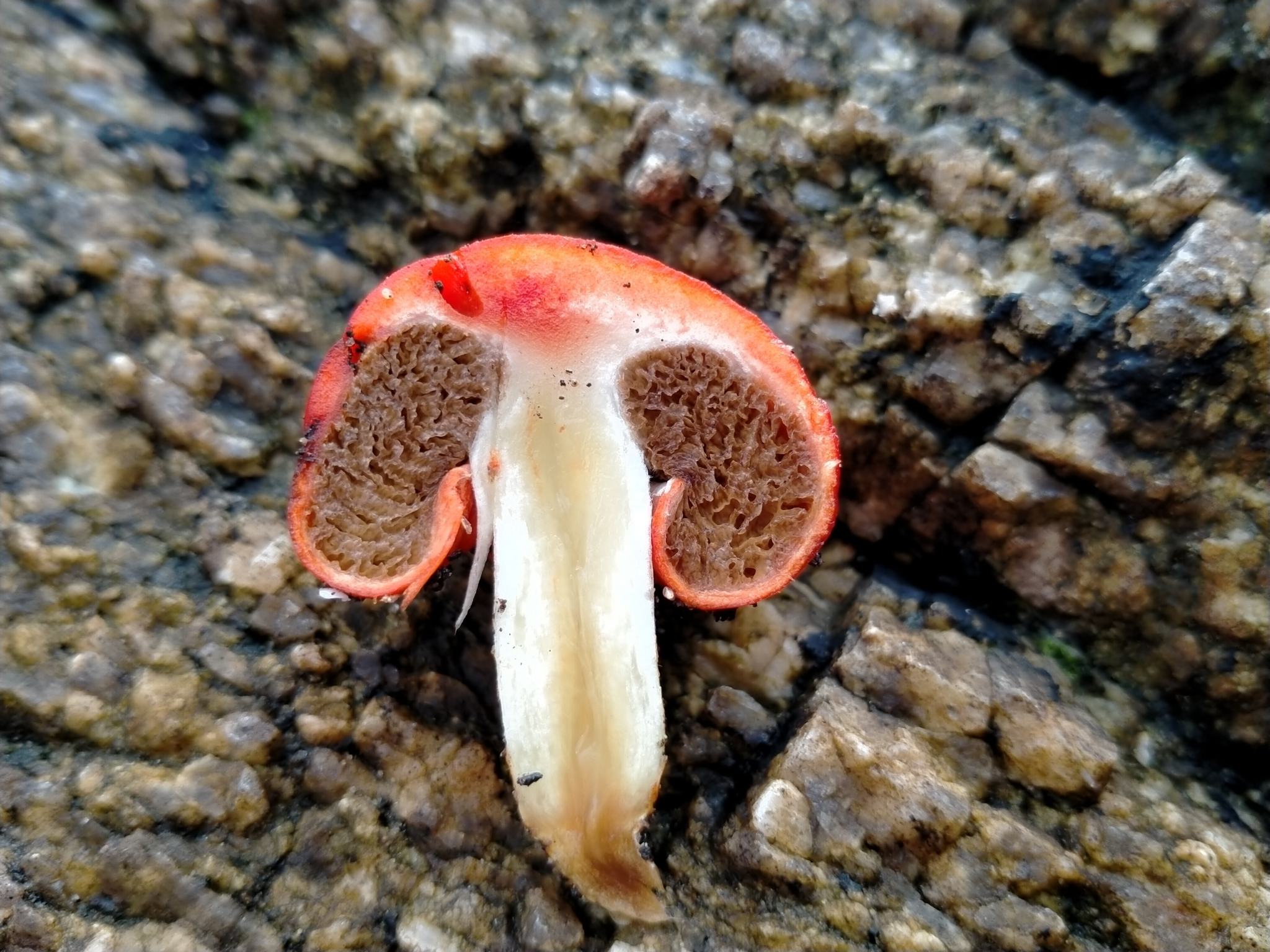
Bisected basidiocarp
