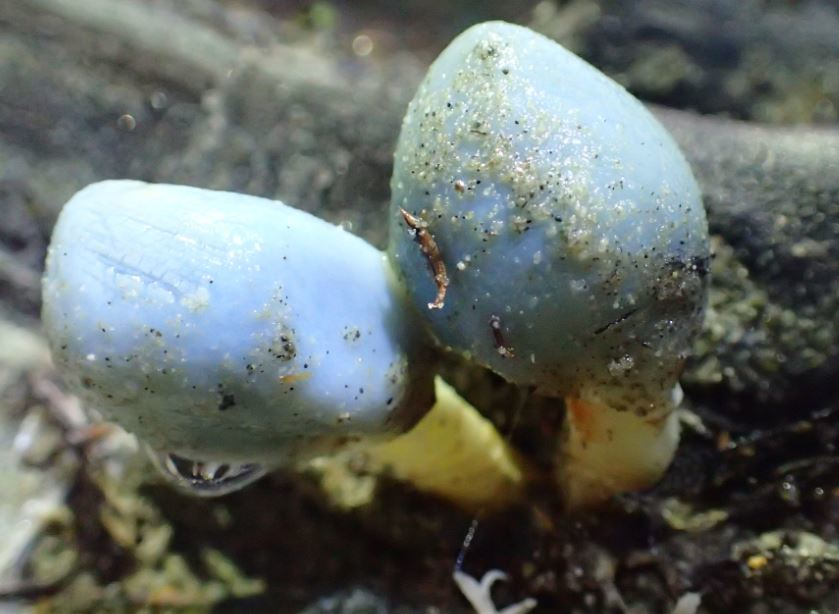
- Clavogaster virescens

Scientific classification
- Domain: Eukaryota
- Kingdom: Fungi
- Division: Basidiomycota
- Class: Agaricomycetes
- Order: Agaricales
- Family: Agaricaceae
- Genus: Clavogaster; Henn. (1896)

Type species
- Clavogaster novozelandicus Henn. (1896)

Species
- Clavogaster novozelandicus Clavogaster virescens

= Clavogaster =

Genus of fungi

Clavogaster is a genus of gasteroid fungi in the family Agaricaceae. The genus was circumscribed by German mycologist Paul Christoph Hennings in 1896 to contain the type species Clavogaster novozelandicus, which is now a synonym of Clavogaster virescens.

== See also ==
- List of Agaricales genera
- List of Agaricaceae genera
