= Secotioid =

Type of fungi

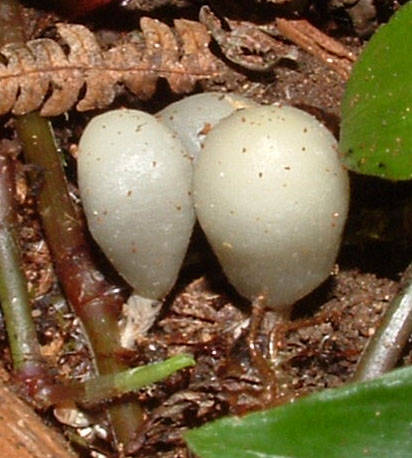
Psilocybe weraroa, a secotioid form of a bluing Psilocybe in the cyanescens complex.

Secotioid fungi produce an intermediate fruiting body form that is between the mushroom-like hymenomycetes and the closed bag-shaped gasteromycetes, where an evolutionary process of gasteromycetation has started but not run to completion. Secotioid fungi may or may not have opening caps, but in any case they often lack the vertical geotropic orientation of the hymenophore needed to allow the spores to be dispersed by wind, and the basidiospores are not forcibly discharged or otherwise prevented from being dispersed (e.g. gills completely inclosed and never exposed as in the secotioid form of Lentinus tigrinus)—note—some mycologists do not consider a species to be secotioid unless it has lost ballistospory.

== Explanation of secotioid development and gasteromycetation ==
Historically agarics and boletes (which bear their spores on a hymenium of gills or tubes respectively) were classified quite separately from the gasteroid fungi, such as puff-balls and truffles, of which the spores are formed in a large mass enclosed in an outer skin. However, in spite of this apparently very great difference in form, recent mycological research, both at microscopic and molecular level has shown that sometimes species of open mushrooms are much more closely related to particular species of gasteroid fungi than they are to each other. Fungi which do not open up to let their spores be dispersed in the air, but which show a clear morphological relation to agarics or boletes, constitute an intermediate form and are called secotioid.

The word is derived from the name of the genus Secotium, which was defined in 1840 by Kunze for a South African example, S. gueinzii, which is the type species. In the following years numerous secotioid species were added to this genus, including ones which according to modern taxonomy belong to other genera or families.

On a microscopic scale, secotioid fungi do not expel their spores forcibly from the basidium; their spores are "statismospores". Like gasteroid fungi, secotioid species rely on animals such as rodents or insects to distribute their spores.

It can at times be disadvantageous for a mushroom to open up and free its spores in the usual way. If this development is aborted, a secotioid form arises, perhaps to be followed eventually by an evolutionary progression to a fully gasteroid form. This type of progression is called gasteromycetation and seems to have happened several times independently starting from various genera of "normal" mushrooms. This means that the secotioid and also the gasteroid fungi are polyphyletic. According to the paper by Thiers, in certain climates and certain seasons, it may be an advantage to remain closed, because moisture can be conserved in that way.

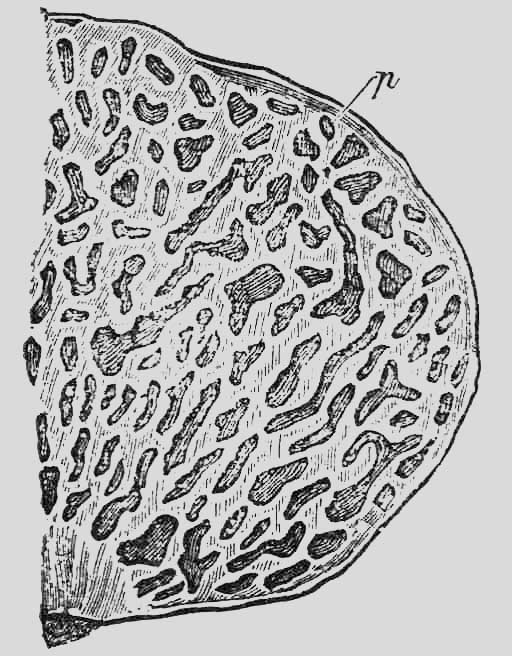
Cross-section of Hymenogaster tener

For example, the gasteroid genus Hymenogaster has been shown to be closely related to agaric genera such as Hebeloma, which were formerly placed in family Cortinariaceae or Strophariaceae. This is found by DNA analysis and also indicated on a microscopic scale by the resemblance of the spores and basidia. According to a current classification system, Hebeloma now belongs to family Hymenogastraceae, and is considered more narrowly related to the closed Hymenogaster fungi than, for instance, to the ordinary mushrooms in genus Cortinarius.

A similar case is the well-known "Deceiver" mushroom Laccaria laccata which is now classified in the Hydnangiaceae, Hydnangium being a gasteroid genus.

It has been found that a change in a single locus of a gene of the gilled mushroom Lentinus tigrinus causes it to have a closed fruiting body. This suggests that the emergence of a secotioid species may not require many mutations.

There is a spectrum of secotioid species ranging from the open form to the closed form in the following respects:

- there may be an evident stipe, or there may be only a remnant consisting of a column of non-fertile tissue,
- if there is a stipe the edge of the cap may separate from it (partially opening), or may not,
- there may be recognizable gills (though oriented in all directions and very convoluted), or the fertile interior may be uniform like the gleba of gasteroid fungi, and
- the spore-bearing tissue may be above ground (epigeous), or underground (hypogeous), or partly buried.

The adjective "sequestrate" is sometimes used as a general term to mean "either secotioid or gasteroid".

== Examples ==
Cortinarius is a very widespread genus of agarics, but also contains some secotioid species, such as C. leucocephalus, C. coneae and C. cartilagineus.

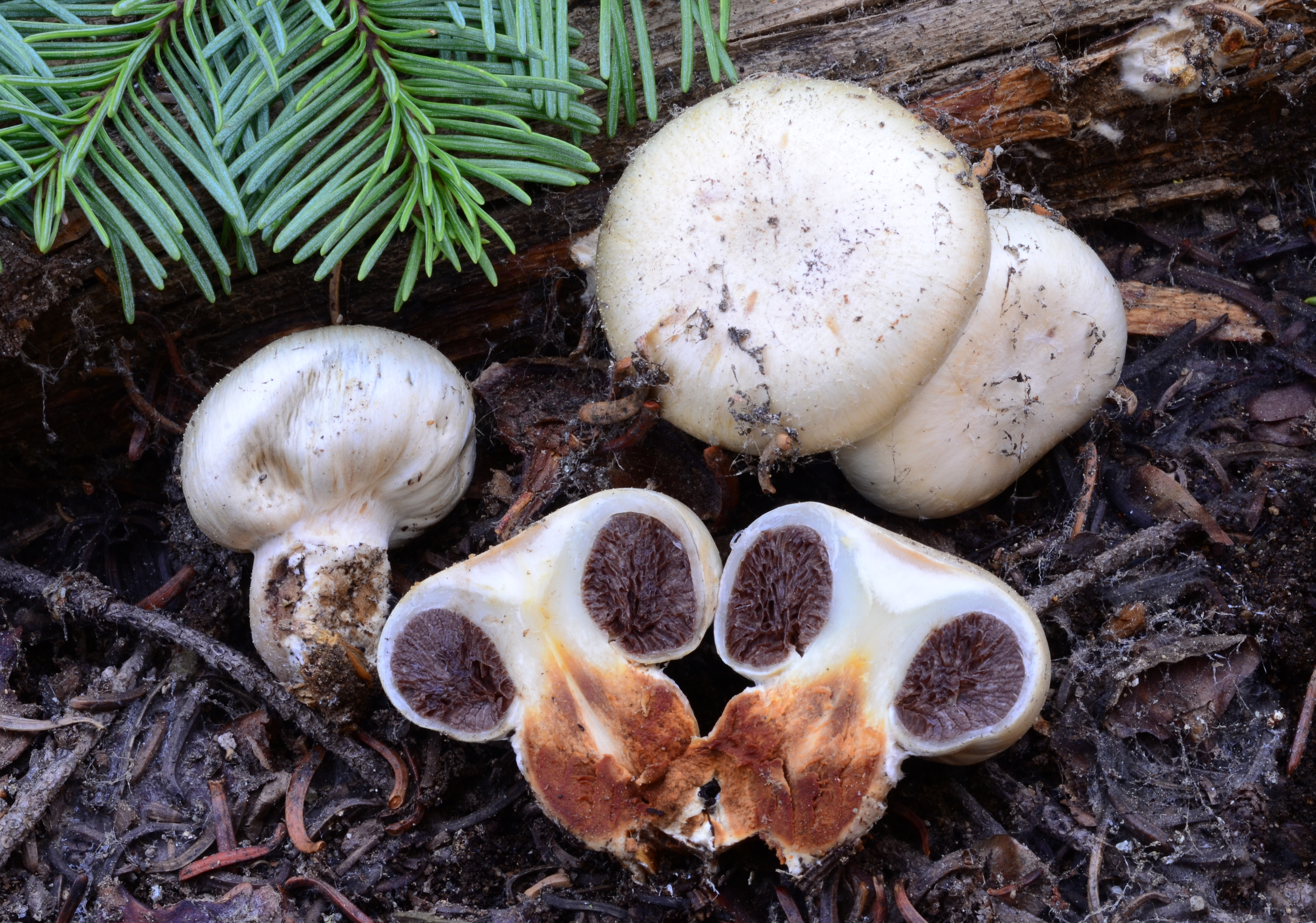
Pholiota nubigena

Pholiota nubigena is a secotioid species found early in the year at high altitude in the western United States. It was originally assigned to Secotium and later to a more specific secotioid genus Nivatogastrium, but in fact it is closely allied to Pholiota squarrosa and it has now been moved to genus Pholiota itself, although the latter consists primarily of agarics.

Gastroboletus is a secotioid bolete genus where the fruiting bodies may or may not open, but in any case the tubes are not aligned vertically as in a true bolete.

Secotioid mushrooms of the genus Endoptychum (such as E. agaricoides, E. arizonicum) have been now moved to genus Chlorophyllum, closely related to Macrolepiota.

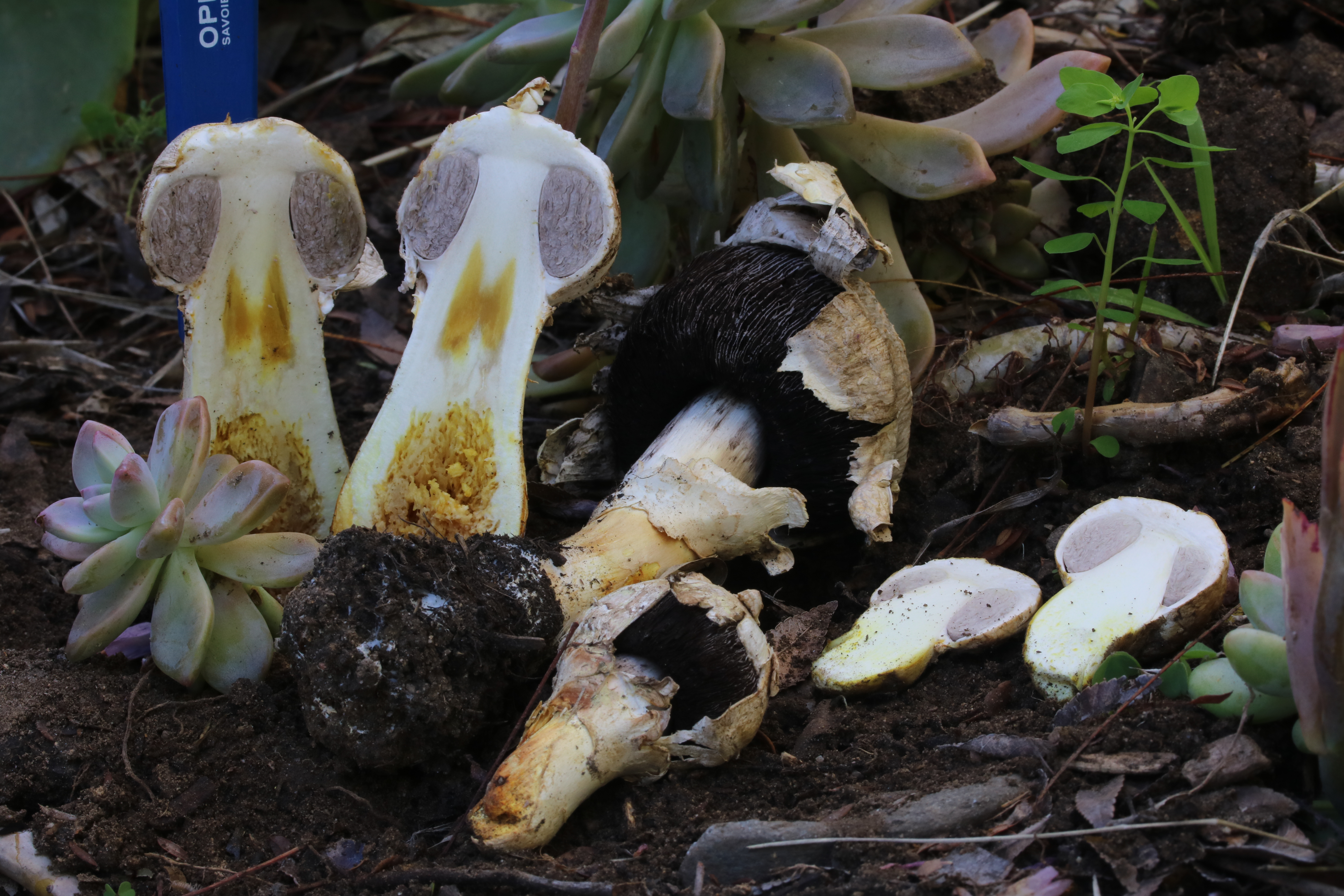
Agaricus deserticola

Agaricus deserticola is a secotioid species of Agaricus (the genus of common cultivated mushrooms) which at one time was placed in the genus Secotium. Similarly, Agaricus inapertus was formerly known as Endoptychum depressum until molecular analysis revealed it to be closely aligned with Agaricus.
