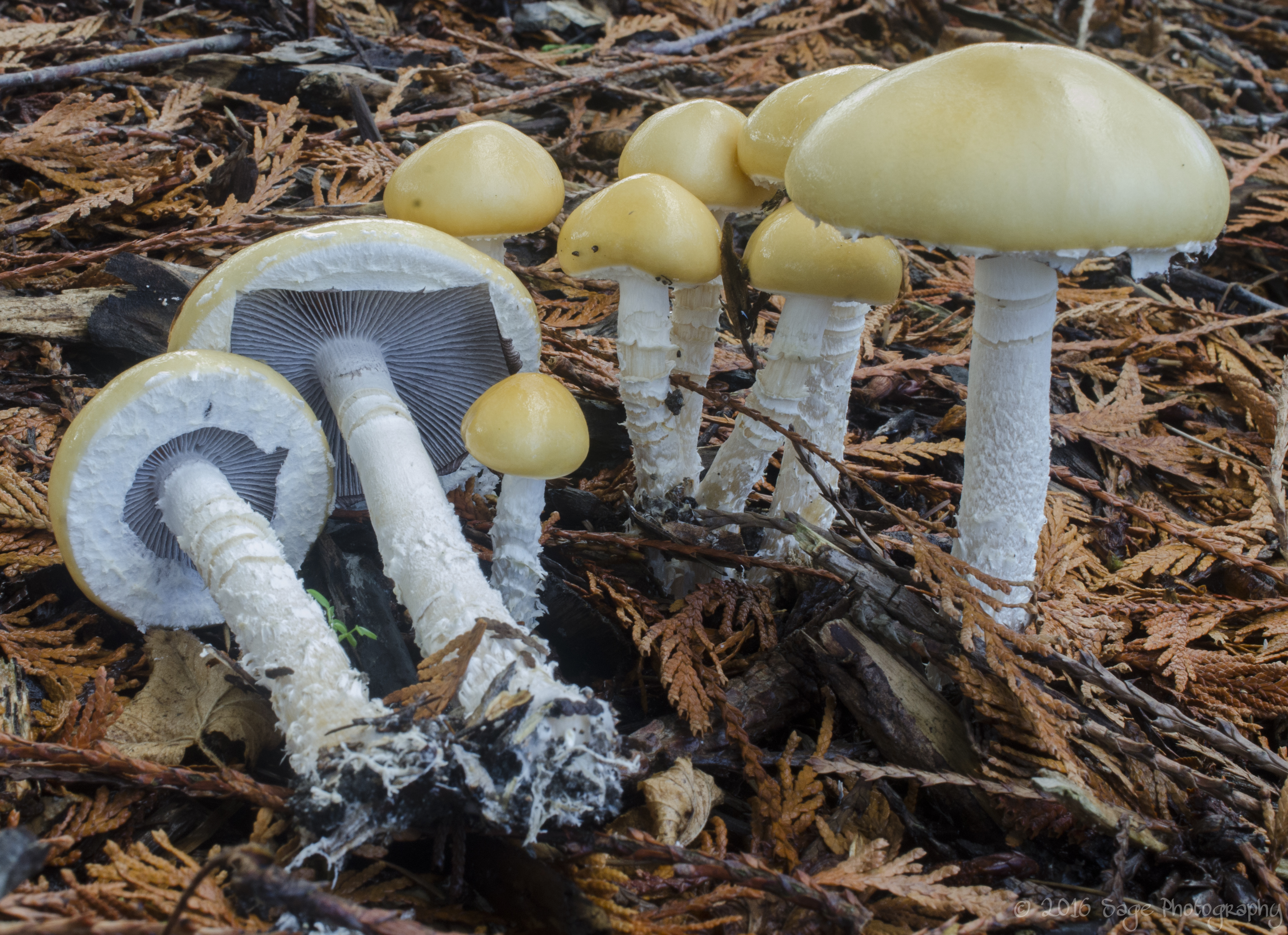

Scientific classification
- Kingdom: Fungi
- Division: Basidiomycota
- Class: Agaricomycetes
- Order: Agaricales
- Family: Strophariaceae
- Genus: Stropharia
- Species: S. ambigua

Binomial name
- Stropharia ambigua (Peck) Zeller (1914)

Synonyms
- Hypholoma ambiguum Peck (1898)

= Stropharia ambigua =

Species of fungus

Stropharia ambigua Mycological characteristics
- Gills on hymenium
- Cap is convex
- Hymenium is adnate
- Stipe has a ring
- Spore print is purple-brown
- Ecology is saprotrophic
- Edibility is unknown

Stropharia ambigua, sometimes known as the questionable Stropharia or ambiguous stropharia, is a saprotrophic agaric mushroom, commonly fruiting in leaf litter and wood chips in the Pacific Northwest. Its edibility is debated.

== Description ==
The cap is 3 to 15 cm (1 1/4 to 6 in) broad, obtuse to convex, becoming flat or uplifted in age; it has a smooth surface, is slimy when moist, and yellowish. The edge may have bits of white veil hanging from it. The flesh is white, thick, and soft. The gills are pale gray and gradually darkens to purplish-gray or purplish-black. The gills occasionally pull away from the stipe with age.

The stipe is 6 to 18 cm (2 1/4 to 7 in) long, 1–2 cm wide, and is stuffed or hollow. It may have bits of white veil hanging from it and, less commonly, a brittle ring. The veil is soft and white. The spore print is dark purplish to nearly black. The species fruits in the spring and fall. It does not have a volva. The species has been said to taste like old leaves.

=== Similar species ===
Within the genus, it can resemble Stropharia aeruginosa, S. coronilla, S. riparia, and S. semiglobata. Leratiomyces percevalii is another potential lookalike.

== Distribution and habitat ==
Stropharia ambigua appears in late fall as a solitary to scattered mushroom or in groups on rich humus, usually under conifers. It can also be found with alder and other hardwoods in the Pacific Coast. It has frequently been found in disturbed areas, such as where wood was handled. The species will colonize outdoor mushroom beds after wood chips have been decomposed by a primary saprotroph. It favors a cold and damp environment.

== Edibility ==
Alexander Hanchett Smith and Nancy S. Weber state that the species is not poisonous. Contrarily, one source regards it as possibly poisonous. Because of conflicting reports on its edibility, the authors David Arora, Orson K. Miller, Jr. and Hope Miller do not recommend eating the species.
