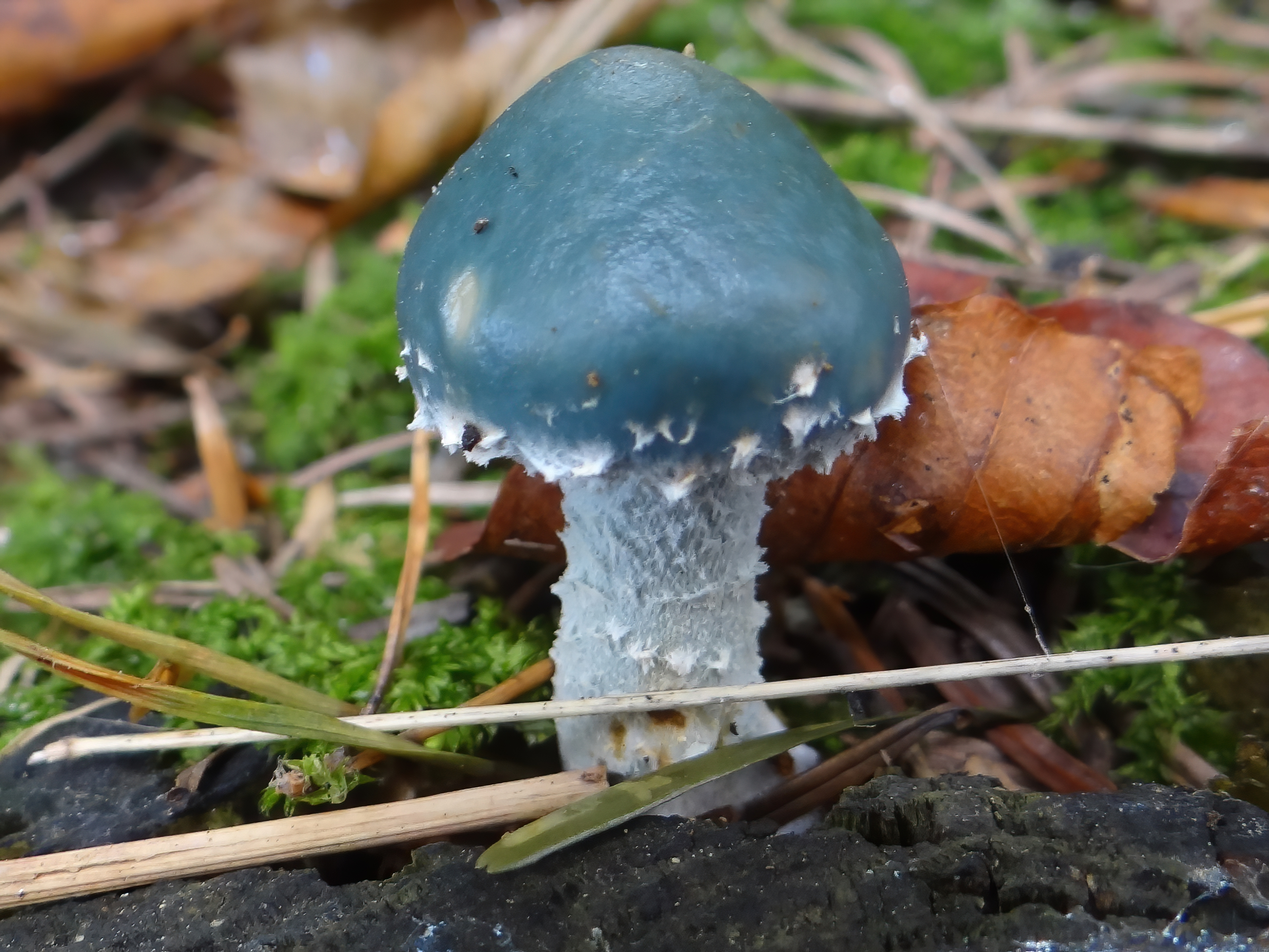

Scientific classification
- Kingdom: Fungi
- Division: Basidiomycota
- Class: Agaricomycetes
- Order: Agaricales
- Family: Strophariaceae
- Genus: Stropharia
- Species: S. caerulea

Binomial name
- Stropharia caerulea Kreisel (1979)

Synonyms
- Agaricus politus Bolton (1788); Stropharia cyanea sensu Tuom. (1953); Psilocybe caerulea (Kreisel) Noordel. (1995)

= Stropharia caerulea =

Species of fungus

Stropharia caerulea
- Mycological characteristics
- Gills on hymenium
- Cap is convex or conical
- Hymenium is adnate or sinuate
- Stipe has a ring
- Spore print is purple-brown
- Edibility is unknown

Stropharia caerulea, commonly known as the blue roundhead, is a species of mushroom forming fungus in the family Strophariaceae. It is a somewhat common species found in Europe and North America, where it grows as a saprophyte in meadows, roadsides, hedgerows, gardens, and woodchip mulch. S. caerulea was officially described to science in 1979, although it was known to be a distinct species for about two centuries before that. The scientific name Stropharia cyanea, as defined by Tuomikoski in 1953, and used by several later authors, is a synonym of S. caerulea.

The fruit bodies (mushrooms) of Stropharia caerulea feature a greenish-blue cap sparsely covered in white flecks of veil at the margin, and a sticky, glutinous surface texture. Gills on the cap underside have an adnate or sinuate attachment to the stipe. They are initially pale purplish-brown, becoming darker brown in age as the spores mature. The greenish stipe is covered in white scales up to a thin, transient ring. It is similar in appearance to a less common relative Stropharia aeruginosa, but that species has a more robust ring on its stipe, more scales on the cap, and darker gills with white edges.

== Taxonomy ==
In 1953, the Finnish scientist Risto Tuomikoski observed that the well-known Stropharia aeruginosa had a lookalike species that was characterized by a brown spore print, an indistinct, temporary ring on the stipe, and chrysocystidia (Note: Chrysocystidia are cystidia whose contents contain a yellow inclusion that becomes more deeply yellow when exposed to ammonia or other alkaline compounds. They are characteristic of the genus Stropharia.) lining the gill edges. Tuomikoski called this lookalike Stropharia cyanea, a name he based on James Bolton's 1820 taxon Agaricus cyaneus. Later researchers confirmed the existence and widespread European distribution of this taxon. Tuomikoski's use of the name S. cyanea, however, was incorrect as Bolton's type refers to the purple-brown spored species S. aeruginosa. Despite this, the misapplied name S. cyanea has persisted in some contemporary field guides. (Note: Examples include Mushrooms by Thomas Laessoe (2002), and Mushrooms and Other Fungi by Roger Phillips (2013).)

Stropharia caerulea was first mentioned in the scientific literature by James Bolton in 1788, under the name Agaricus politus. This usage is not considered valid according to nomenclatural rules, because it was used by Christian Hendrik Persoon to refer to another species in his 1801 Synopsis methodica fungorum, which is a sanctioned work. Stropharia caerulea was officially described by mycologist Hanns Kreisel in 1979 from collections made near Woldegk, Germany. Machiel Noordeloos transferred the species to Psilocybe in 1995, but today this genus is mostly reserved for species that contain the psychoactive compounds psilocybin and psilocin. Although psilocybin had once been reported from S. caerulea, this was almost certainly an error as subsequent analyses have not revealed any traces of the substance in the fruit bodies.

The specific epithet caerulea is Latin for "blue". The mushroom is commonly known as the blue roundhead. French mycologist Régis Courtecuisse has called the mushroom "verdigris agaric", but numerous other authors use this name to refer instead to Stropharia aeruginosa.

== Description ==
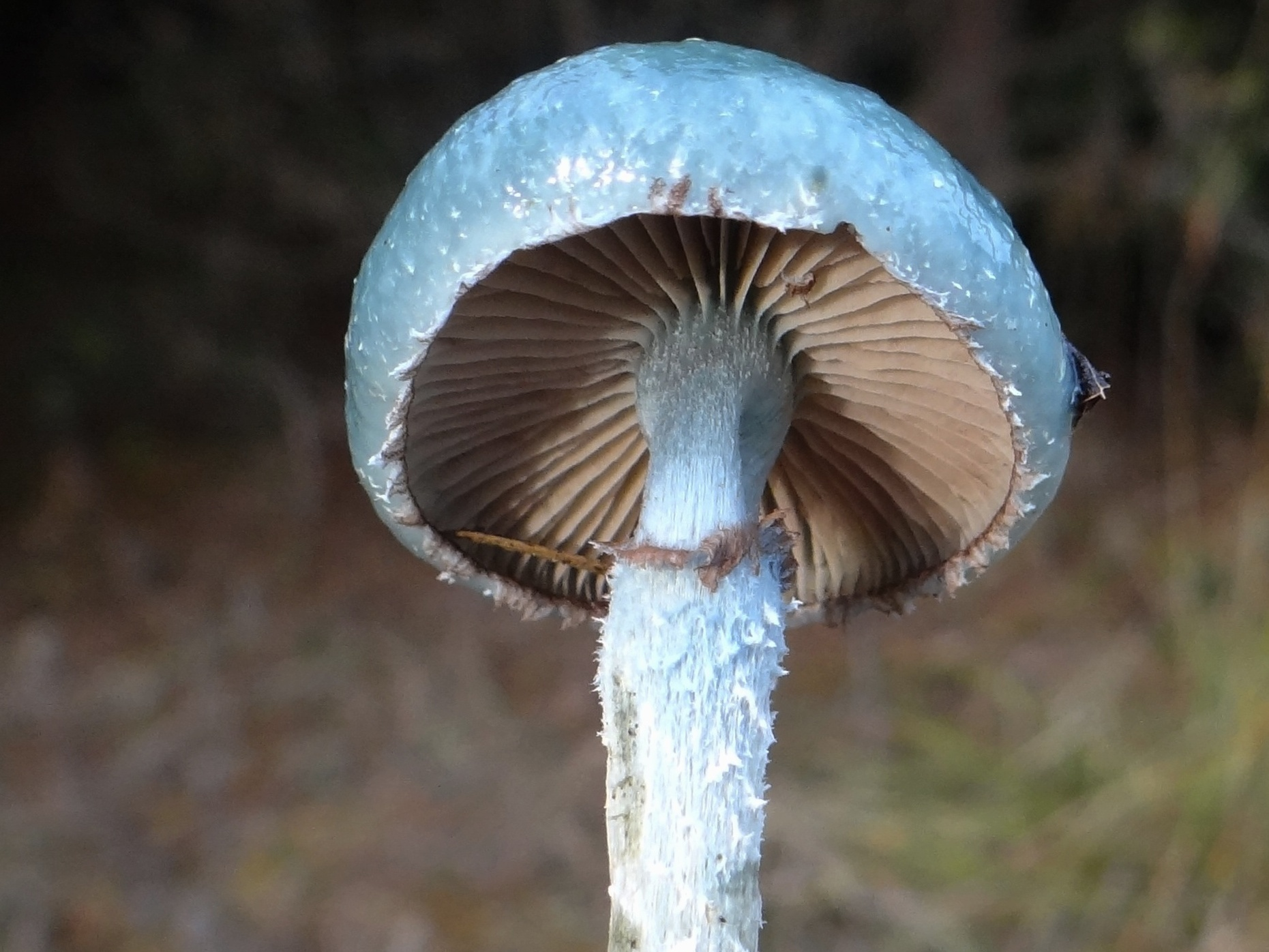
A prominent characteristic is the smooth and scaly surface upper and lower stipe texture, divided by a short-lived annular zone.

Fruitbodies have conical to flattened caps measuring 2–7.5 cm (0.8–3.0 in) in diameter. They usually have a low, broad umbo. The colour of the cap depends on its age, ranging from pale blue-green to yellowish-bluish green. There is often a whitish zone around the margin, which invariably has bluish-green tints. When moist, the cap is sticky with a cuticle that may be readily peeled; dry caps are smooth and shiny. Gills are initially pale purplish-brown, becoming darker brown in age as the spores mature. They have an adnate or sinuate attachment to the stipe. The stipe has a short-lived annular (ring) zone; above this zone the stipe is smooth, while below it is fibrous and scaly. The flesh is colourless, although it may have tinges of blue in the cap and stipe, and lacks any distinctive odour or flavour. Stropharia cyanea fruit bodies are of unknown edibility.

The spore print is brown. (Note: In his 1979 publication, Kreisel explicitly notes the lack of purple tones in the brown spore print colour, which he states is "a unique characteristic in the genus Stropharia". However, this feature is de-emphasized by some later authors, who give the spore print colour as purple-brown.) Spores typically measure 8.0–9.0 by 4.0–5.5 μm, and have an ellipsoid to oblong to ovoid shape, depending on the viewing angle. Basidia (spore-bearing cells) are narrowly club-shaped, four-spored, and have dimensions of 24–40 by 7–12 μm. The cheilochrysocystidia (found on the gill edge) are club-shaped, measuring 30–55 by 4–40 μm, with a neck that is 2–5 μm wide. Pleurochrysocystidia (on the gill face) are 40–60 by 5–18 μm with a 2–4 μm-wide neck. Clamp connections are abundant in all tissues of S. caerulea. The fungus produces acanthocytes, spiny cells produced on short branches on the mycelium.

=== Similar species ===
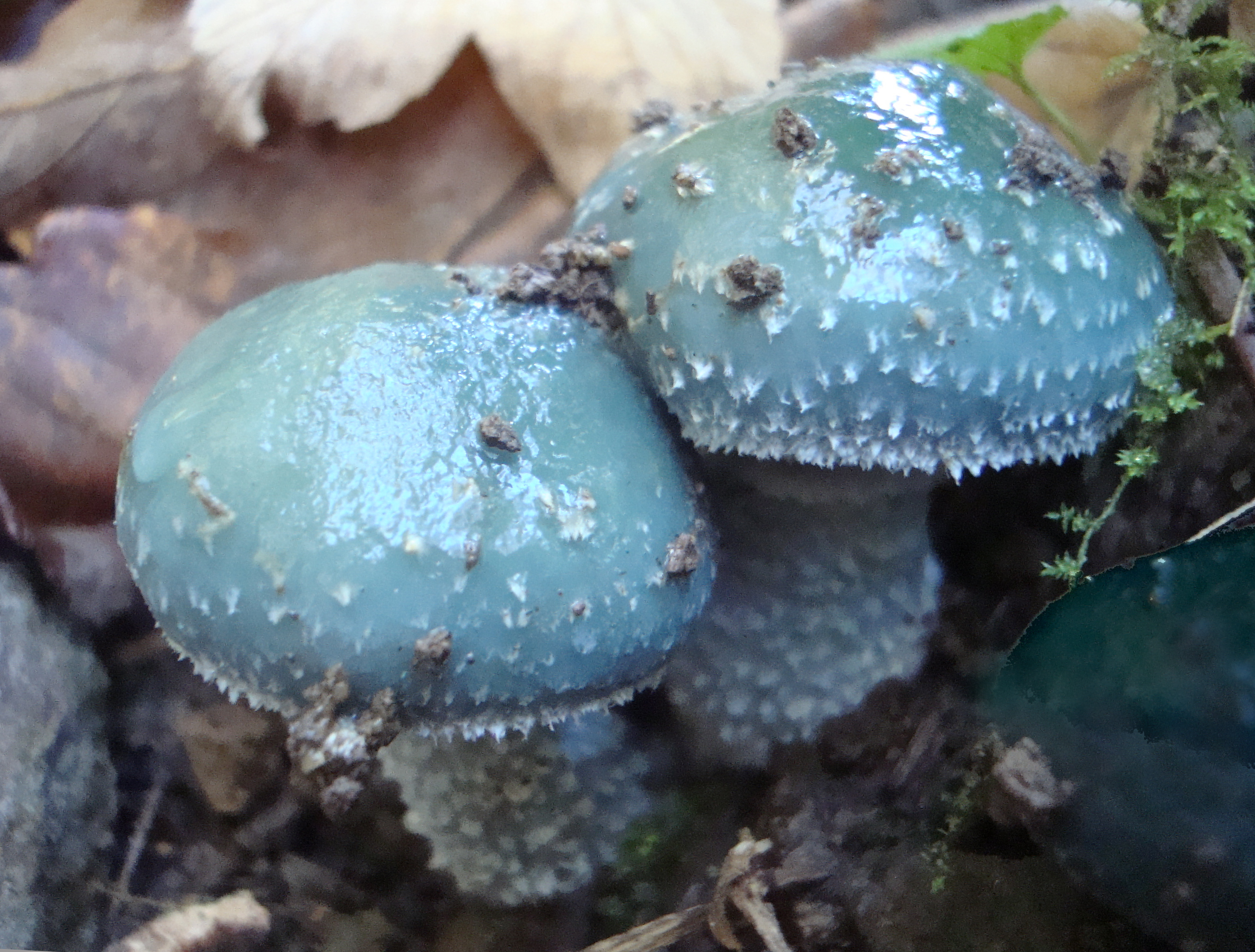
The lookalike S. aeruginosa has white scales around its cap margin.

There are a few greenish Stropharia with which S. caerulea might be confused. Stropharia pseudocyanea is an uncommon species that grows in meadows. It has a more slender form than S. caerulea, a soft, spongy stipe, and flesh with an odour similar to fresh pepper. Microscopically, it has a dense palisade of slender, capitate (with a spherical tip) non-staining cheilocystidia on the gill edge. This gives the gills of young, fresh fruit bodies a whitish edge, a feature that is absent from S. caerulea. Another lookalike, S. aeruginosa, is less common than S. caerulea. It is distinguished from the latter by the well-developed ring zone on its stipe, darker gills with white edges, and more numerous whitish scales around the cap margin. Additionally, S. aeruginosa has more stable colours than S. caerulea, the colouration of which tends to quickly wash out. However, collections of Stropharia often show characteristics that are intermediate between two or more species, making them difficult to identify accurately.

== Habitat, distribution, and ecology ==
Stropharia caerulea is a saprophytic fungus that fruits singly or in groups. It grows in or on meadows, roadsides, hedgerows, gardens, and woodchip mulch. In Europe it is often found in beech woods in alkaline soil. It is a common species found throughout Europe, where it fruits from July to November. Although also found in North America, generally fruiting from August to October, the full extent of its distribution there is unknown.

Fruitbodies of Stropharia caerulea form mycelial cords–rootlike structures consisting of a dense mass of hyphae–which create extensive underground networks that move nutrients and allow the fungus to "forage" for resources. These cords are often associated with stems and rhizomes of the common nettle (Urtica dioica). These mycelial systems' development and the species's interactions with other cord-forming wood decomposer basidiomycetes have been investigated. The mycelia of Stropharia caerulea form a fractal structure characterized by a dense, relatively slowly extending front, a formation associated with finding relatively homogeneously distributed nutrients–equivalent to short-range foraging. An increase in the supply of soil nitrogen or phosphorus increases the fractal branching of the mycelia, allowing increased uptake of nutrients.
