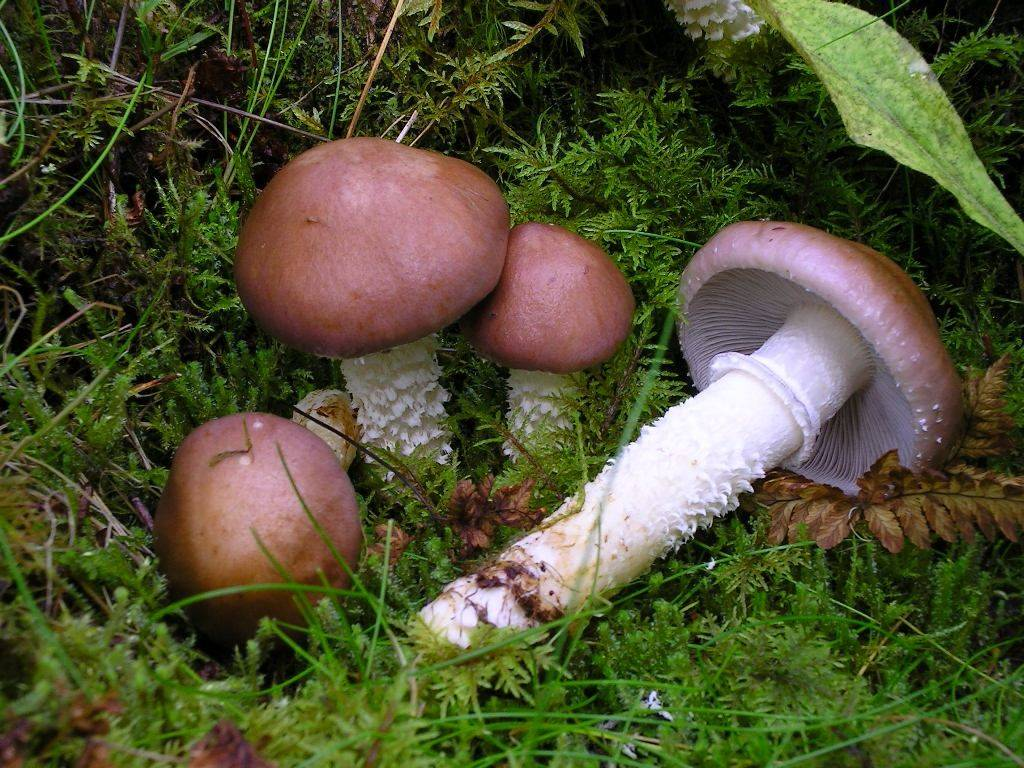

Scientific classification
- Kingdom: Fungi
- Division: Basidiomycota
- Class: Agaricomycetes
- Order: Agaricales
- Family: Strophariaceae
- Genus: Stropharia
- Species: S. hornemannii

Binomial name
- Stropharia hornemannii (Fr.) S.Lundell & Nannf. (1934)

Synonyms
- List: Agaricus depilatus Pers. (1801); Agaricus hornemanni Fr. (1818); Agaricus hornemannii var. depilatus Fr. (1821); Stropharia depilata (Pers.) Sacc. (1887); Fungus depilatus (Pers.) Kuntze (1898); Stropharia depilata var. microspora Pilát (1950); Naematoloma hornemannii (Fr.) Singer (1951); Geophila depilata (Pers.) Kühner & Romagn. (1953); Psilocybe hornemannii (Fr.) Noordel. (1995)

= Stropharia hornemannii =

Species of fungus

Stropharia hornemannii
- Mycological characteristics
- Gills on hymenium
- Cap is convex
- Hymenium is adnate or seceding
- Stipe has a ring
- Spore print is purple-brown to purple-black
- Ecology is saprotrophic
- Edibility is inedible or poisonous

Stropharia hornemannii, commonly known as the luxuriant ringstalk or lacerated stropharia, is a species of agaric fungus in the family Strophariaceae. The fungus produces distinctive mushrooms with caps up to 12 cm wide, which range from greyish-brown with purplish tints to reddish-brown, featuring a hanging ring on the stipe and gills that change from greyish-violet to dark purple-brown as they mature.

== Taxonomy ==
The specific epithet hornemannii honours the Danish botanist Jens Wilken Hornemann, who made the first scientifically documented collections of the species.

== Description ==
Stropharia hornemannii is a distinctive mushroom-forming fungus species within the genus Stropharia. The fruiting body features a large cap measuring up to 12 centimetres (4 3/4 in) in diameter, initially convex with an elevated centre and inflexed margin, later becoming convex-expanded. Its colouration varies considerably between specimens, ranging from greyish-brown with purplish tints to reddish-brown at the disc with pale yellowish margins, or sometimes entirely yellowish. The cap surface appears smooth to the naked eye but reveals innate brownish-purplish fibrils under magnification. It feels moist to the touch and can become viscous, particularly in young specimens. A well-developed whitish partial veil forms a membrane in young specimens, with fragments often remaining attached to the cap edges as it expands.

The stipe is 5–15 cm (2–6 in) long and 0.5–2.5 cm (1/4–1 in) thick, appearing slender with a yellowish-white colouration, occasionally showing brownish-yellow stains. A pendant (hanging), pleated-grooved, fragile ring encircles the upper portion, though this may deteriorate with age. Below the ring, the stipe is covered with whitish, spreading scales that can also disappear in mature specimens, while above it displays a roughly powdered appearance. The gills lamella are closely arranged, broadly attached to the stipe, and extend down it in a thin line. Young specimens display a greyish-violet colour with amethyst tints, later becoming discoloured by the spores. The gill edges appear whitish and fringed under magnification.

When cut, the mushroom emits a strong, unpleasant odour, though this is less noticeable externally. The taste is described as unpleasant and bitter after chewing. Microscopically, the spores measure 11.5–13 × 6–6.5 μm, are elliptical with a distinct germination pore, and are carried on four-spored basidia. The gill edges contain numerous marginal hairs (cheilocystidia) while the faces feature chrysocystidia of variable shape. The cap cuticle consists of slender, clamped hyphae with gelatinised walls, while the flesh contains oil-bearing hyphae that fragment into refractive yellow cylindrical bodies. The mushroom is inedible and may be poisonous.

=== Similar species ===
Stropharia hornemannii is somewhat similar in appearance to S. ambigua and S. rugosoannulata.

== Habitat and distribution ==
Stropharia hornemannii is primarily a boreal species with a distribution centred in Northern Europe. It is particularly common in Scandinavia, where Elias Magnus Fries described it as "ubiquitous in our coniferous forests on the ground, rarer on trunks, throughout autumn" in his Monographia. The species has been documented at various locations throughout Central Europe, with detailed occurrence records compiled by various mycologists.

The first confirmed collection in France was reported in 1971 from the Massif Central, representing the westernmost extension of its known range at that time. This significant finding included over 50 fruiting bodies growing in several locations near Col de la Charme at an altitude of about 1,200 metres in the Bois Noirs region. The species was found in a gently sloping fir-dominated forest, primarily growing on decaying wood fragments buried within humus and moss (Rhytidiadelphus loreus). The mushroom appears to prefer coniferous woodland habitats, particularly those dominated by fir species. While it is most frequently found terrestrially, it can occasionally be observed growing directly on decaying wood. Its fruiting period extends throughout the autumn months, with documented collections in France occurring in September and October.
