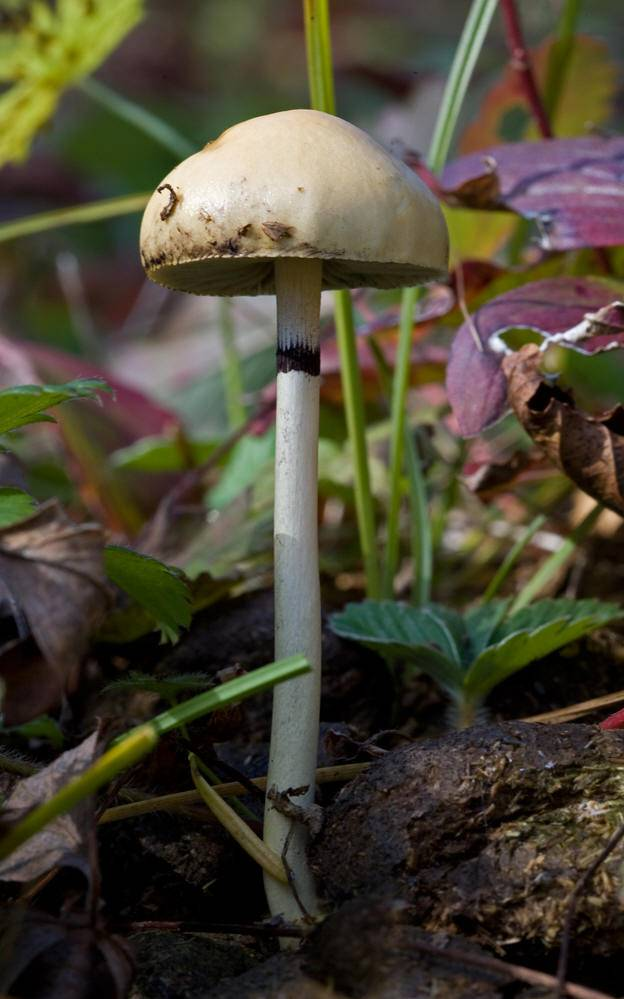
- On moose dung, Newfoundland, Canada

Scientific classification
- Kingdom: Fungi
- Division: Basidiomycota
- Class: Agaricomycetes
- Order: Agaricales
- Family: Strophariaceae
- Genus: Protostropharia
- Species: P. alcis

Binomial name
- Protostropharia alcis (Kytöv.) Redhead, Thorn & Malloch (2013)

Synonyms
- Stropharia alcis Kytöv. (1999)

= Protostropharia alcis =

Species of fungus

Protostropharia alcis Mycological characteristics
- Gills on hymenium
- Cap is convex
- Hymenium is adnate
- Stipe has a ring
- Spore print is purple-black
- Ecology is saprotrophic
- Edibility is unknown

Protostropharia alcis is a species of coprophilous agaric fungus in the family Strophariaceae. The fungus produces fruit bodies on moose, elk, and deer dung. The species has been recorded in Europe, Canada and Brazil.

== Habitat ==
In Wigierski National Park in Poland, it occurs in wetland forests with conifers such as Norway spruce and Scots pine, together with common alder, silver birch and moor birch, and in dominated woodlands on swamp peat and wet acid-mineral soils. P. alcis tends to grow where moose are present. It appears from September to October.

The type specimen was found in a spruce-hardwood forest in the eastern part of Northern Ostrobothnia region in Central Finland.

== Taxonomic history ==
It was originally described by Finnish mycologist Ilkka Kytövuori in 1999, as one of six species in the "Stropharia semiglobata" group in northwestern Europe.

In 2013, the fungus was transferred by Redhead et al. to Protostropharia, a genus circumscribed to contain Stropharia species characterized by the formation of astrocystidia rather than acanthocytes on their mycelium.

The variety austrobrasiliensis was described from Rio Grande do Sul in 2008, where it grows on cow dung, or dung-enriched soil.

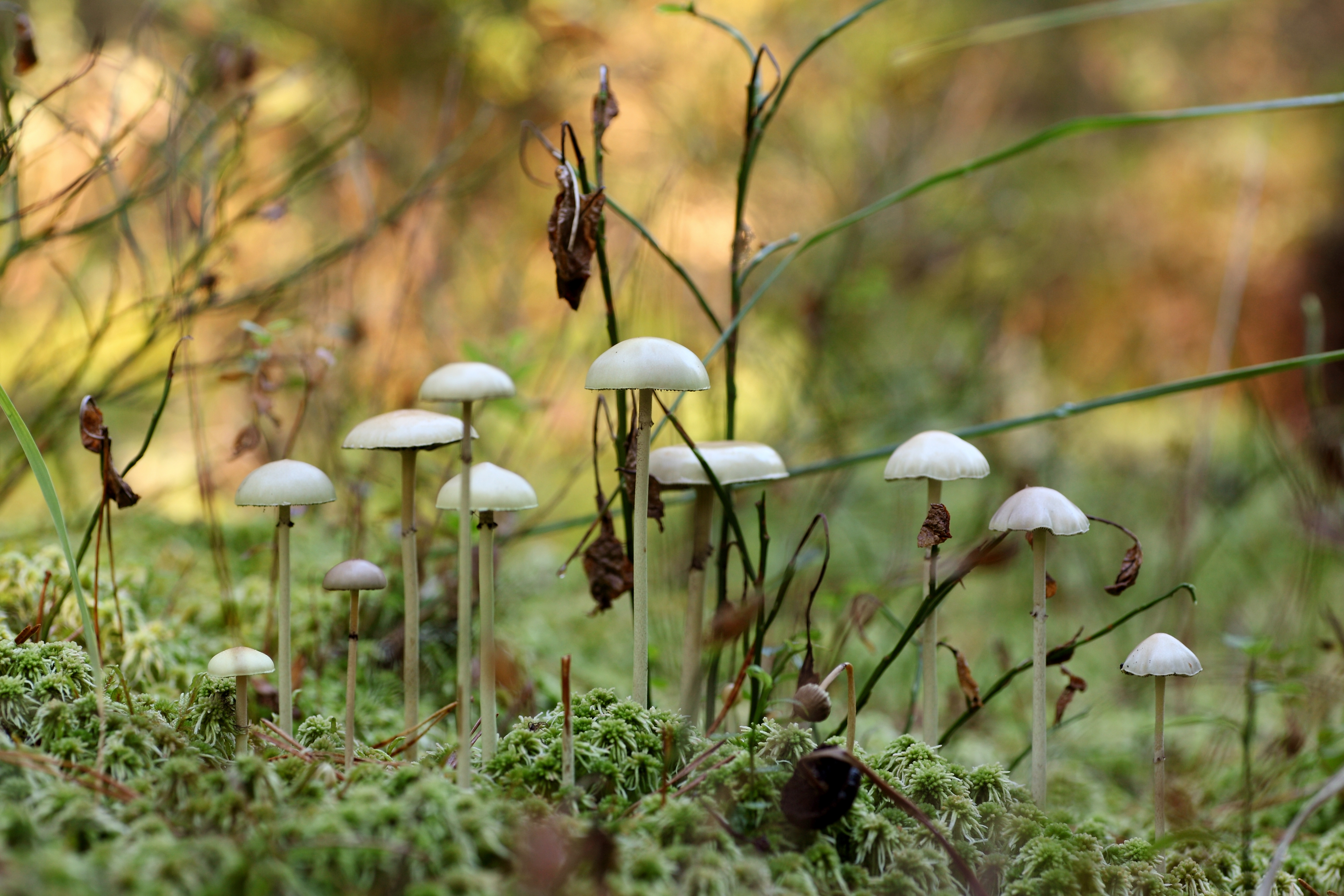
P. alcis in Albu Parish, Estonia
