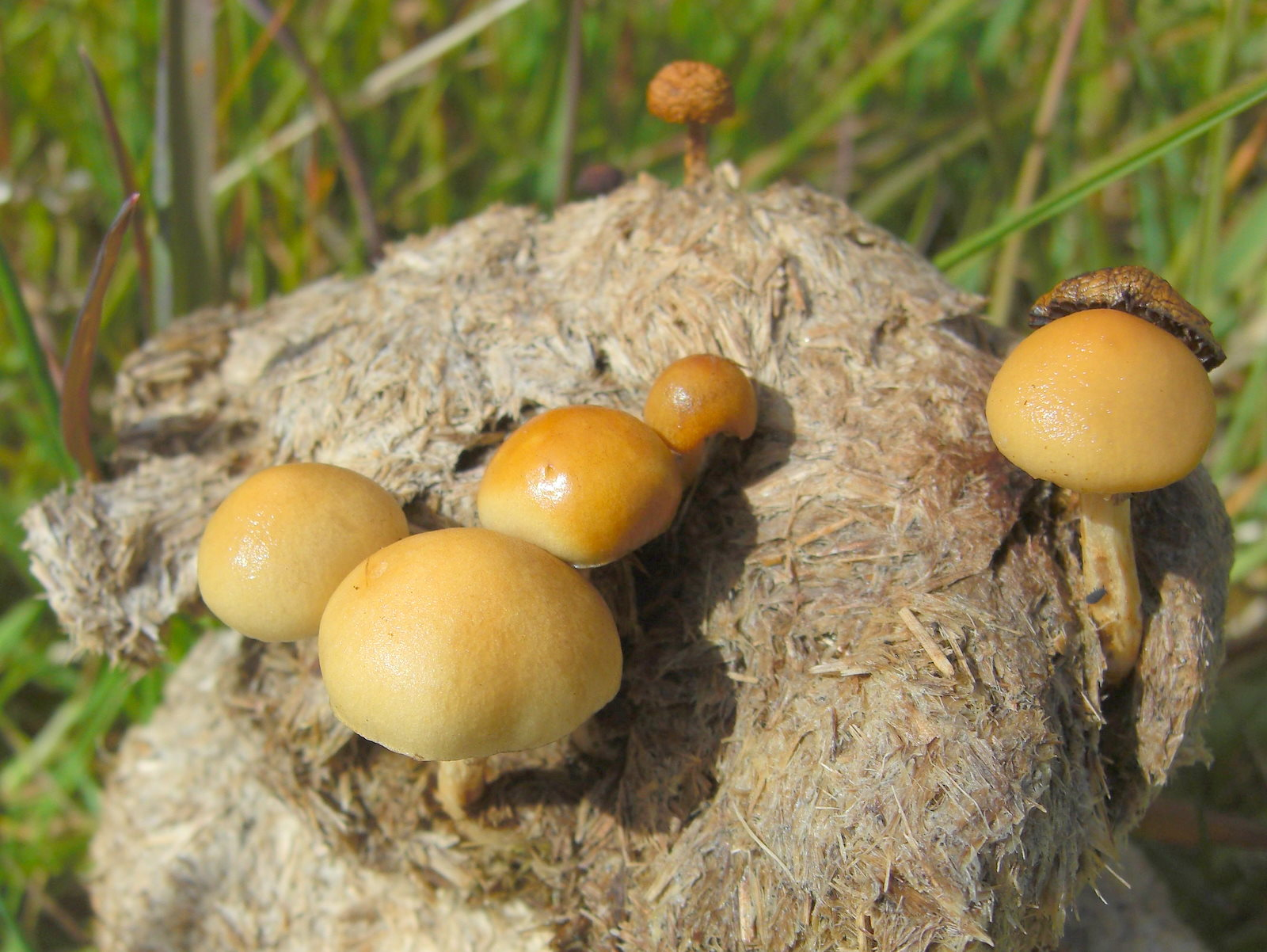
- Protostropharia semiglobata growing on llama dung in South America

Scientific classification
- Kingdom: Fungi
- Division: Basidiomycota
- Class: Agaricomycetes
- Order: Agaricales
- Family: Strophariaceae
- Genus: Protostropharia; Redhead, Moncalvo, & Vilgalys (2013)

Type species
- Protostropharia semiglobata (Batsch) Redhead, Moncalvo, Vilgalys (2013)

Species
- Protostropharia alcis Protostropharia arctica Protostropharia dorsipora Protostropharia islandica Protostropharia luteonitens Protostropharia semiglobata Protostropharia tuberosa

= Protostropharia =

Genus of fungi

Protostropharia Mycological characteristics
- Gills on hymenium
- Cap is convex
- Hymenium is adnate
- Stipe has a ring
- Spore print is purple-black
- Ecology is saprotrophic
- Edibility is unknown

Protostropharia, is a coprophilous agaric fungal genus that produces glutinous, mostly yellowish to yellow brown fruit bodies. Characteristically most form chrysocystidia and rather large, smooth, violaceous basidiospores each with a prominent germ pore (as Stropharia subg. Stercophila). It is differentiated from Stropharia by production of astrocystidia on its mycelium rather than by acanthocytes that Stropharia produces. Phylogenetically, Protostropharia is distinct from Stropharia, Pholiota, and Leratiomyces. Two species, P. luteonitens and P. tuberosa, form pseudosclerotia within the dung substrate.

== Etymology ==
The name Protostropharia refers to the less anatomically complex astrocystidia (Greek proto-) as compared to the acanthocytes in Stropharia.
