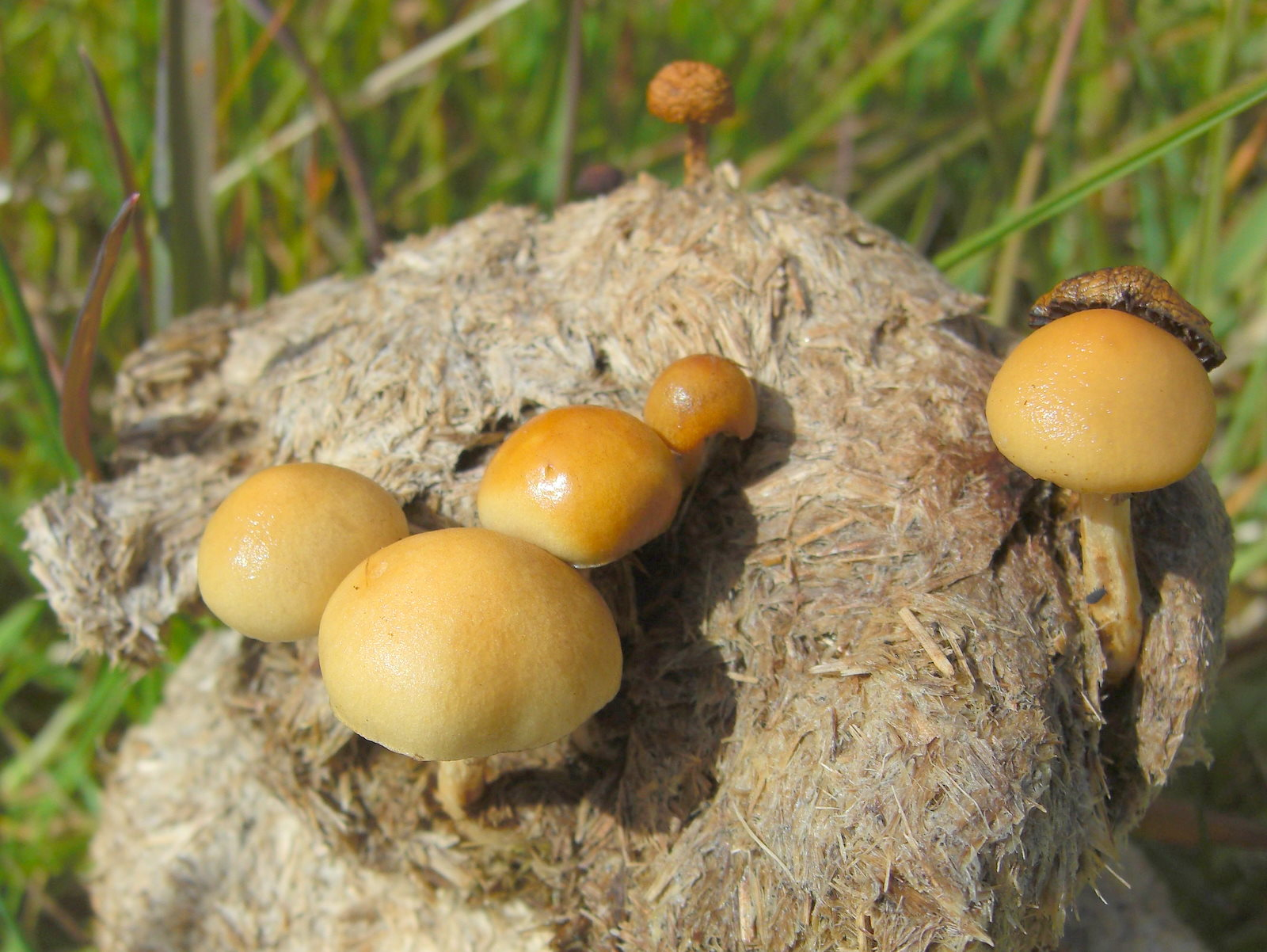
- Growing on llama dung in South America

Scientific classification
- Kingdom: Fungi
- Division: Basidiomycota
- Class: Agaricomycetes
- Order: Agaricales
- Family: Strophariaceae
- Genus: Protostropharia
- Species: P. semiglobata

Binomial name
- Protostropharia semiglobata (Batsch) Redhead, Moncalvo & Vilgays (2013)

Synonyms
- Agaricus semiglobatus Batsch (1786); Agaricus nitens Bull. (1792); Coprinus semiglobatus (Batsch) Gray (1821); Stropharia semiglobata (Batsch) Quél. (1872); Geophila semiglobata (Batsch) Quél. (1886); Psalliota semiglobata (Batsch) P.Kumm. (1871); Fungus semiglobatus (Batsch) Kuntze (1898); Psilocybe semiglobata (Batsch) Noordel. (1995)

= Protostropharia semiglobata =

Species of fungus

Protostropharia semiglobata Mycological characteristics
- Gills on hymenium
- Cap is convex
- Hymenium is adnate
- Stipe has a ring
- Spore print is purple-black
- Ecology is saprotrophic
- Edibility is unknown

Protostropharia semiglobata, commonly known as the hemispherical stropharia, the dung roundhead, or the halfglobe mushroom, is an agaric fungus of the family Strophariaceae. The mushrooms have hemispherical straw yellow to buff-tan caps measuring 1–4 cm (0.4–1.6 in), greyish gills that become dark brown in age, and a slender, smooth stem 3–12 cm (1.2–4.7 in) long with a fragile ring.

A common and widespread species with a cosmopolitan distribution, the fungus produces mushrooms on the dung of various wild and domesticated ruminants.

== Taxonomy ==
The species was first described as Agaricus semiglobatus by August Batsch in 1786. It has had a complicated taxonomic history, having been shuffled to many different genera. In addition to Agaricus the species has been placed in Coprinus, Geophila, Psalliota, and Psilocybe. French mycologist Lucien Quélet gave it its most commonly used name in 1872 when he transferred it to Stropharia. In 2013, Scott Redhead made it the type species of Protostropharia, a new genus circumscribed to contain Stropharia species characterized by the formation of astrocystidia rather than acanthocytes on their mycelium. A form sterilis and two varieties, minor and radicata, described by F.H. Møller in 1945, are no longer considered to have independent taxonomic significance.

The specific epithet semiglobata is Latin for "half-spherical", and refers to the shape of the cap. It is commonly known as the halfglobe mushroom, the hemispheric stropharia, the round stropharia, or the dung roundhead.

== Description ==
The cap is obtuse to hemispherical in shape, reaching a diameter of 1–4.5 cm (0.4–1.8 in). The cap surface is smooth and sticky, and initially has a light yellow color that fades in maturity to dull yellow or whitish. The gills usually have an adnate attachment to the stem with a slight decurrent tooth. They are initially grayish, but become purplish brown to black, with white and fringed edges. They are distantly spaced and broad–about 6–8 mm; mature gills become ventricose (swollen).

The stem is 3–12 cm (1.2–4.7 in) long by 0.2–0.5 cm (0.1–0.2 in) thick, with a bulbous base. Initially filled with a cottony pith, the stem becomes hollow in maturity. A delicate ring forms an annular zone on the mid to upper portion of the stem that may be darkened from spore deposits. Above the annular zone, the stem is covered with fine silk-like hairs; below, it is sticky. The stem tissue is white with a yellowish pith. The flesh has no distinctive odor, and a taste that is mild to slightly bitter.

The mushroom produce a dark purple spore print. The thick-walled spores are ellipsoidal, smooth, and have a small apical germ pore; they measure 16.1–19.0 by 8.8–11.0 μm. The basidia (spore-bearing cells) are four-spored, club-shaped, hyaline (translucent), and measure 33–40 by 13–14.6 μm.

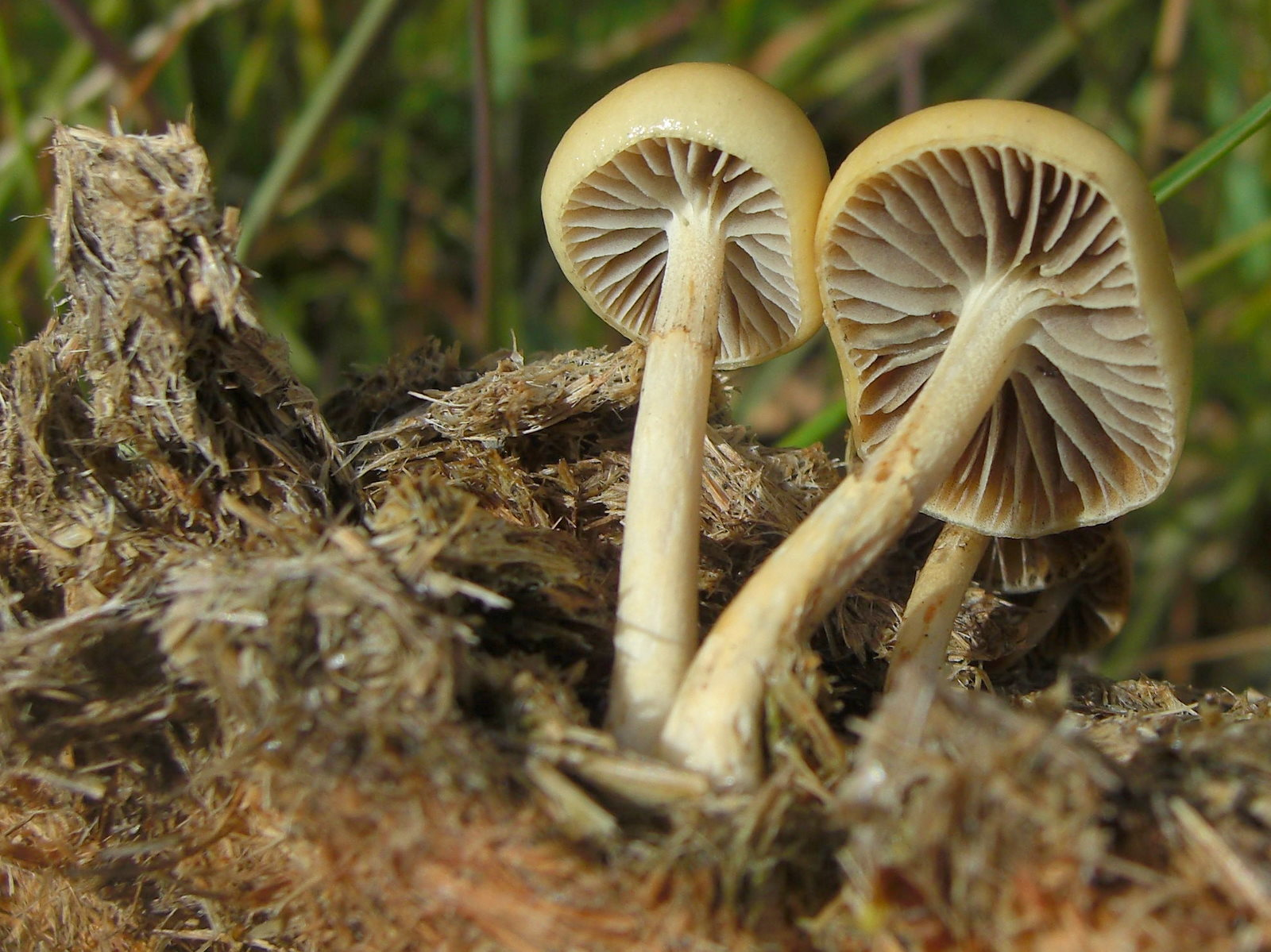
Gills of young specimens

=== Similar species ===
Microscopy may be needed to distinguish the species from members of its genus. Other lookalikes include Agrocybe pediades, Panaeolus semiovatus, and various species of Stropharia.

== Habitat and distribution ==
A saprobic species, the fungus fruits in small groups on dung, in soil containing manure, on lawns, grasslands, or in livestock corrals. It has been recorded on the dung of a variety of wild and domesticated herbivores and ungulates, including rabbit, sheep, cow, buffalo, moose, bear, and wallaby. In some instances, the dung substrate is under moss so that it appears as if the mushroom is growing from the moss. Fruits bodies sometimes occur with another dung-loving fungus, Deconica coprophila. A widespread and common species, P. semiglobosa has a cosmopolitan distribution, having been recorded from northern Asia, Australia, Europe, Central and South America, North America, North Africa, and New Zealand. It is thought to have been introduced to Australia with imported domestic stock.

== Edibility ==
The fruit bodies have been listed as edible by some authors, but poisonous by others. Even when not toxic, mushrooms that grow on dung are usually considered unpalatable, though Agaricus is a counter-example.
