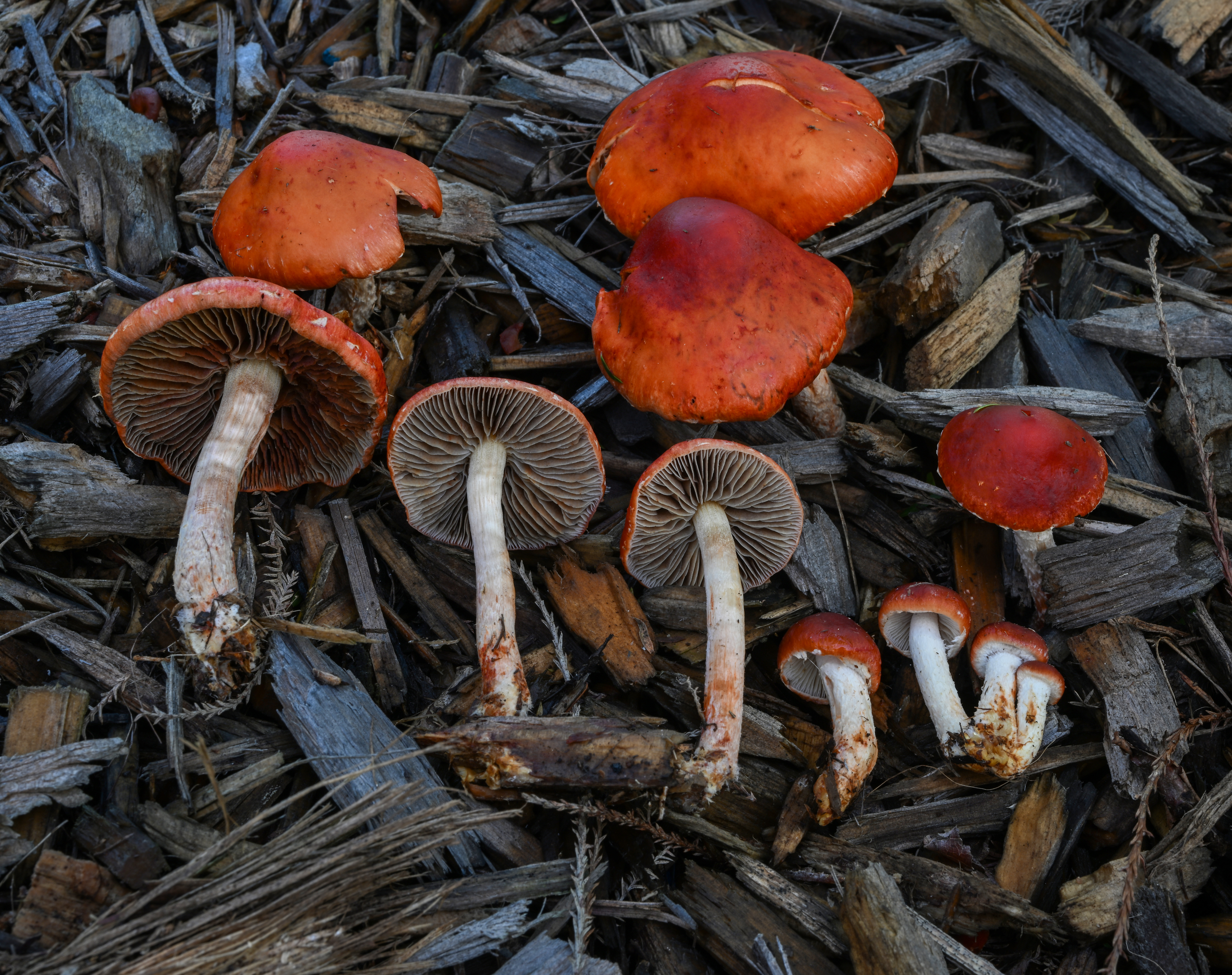

Scientific classification
- Kingdom: Fungi
- Division: Basidiomycota
- Class: Agaricomycetes
- Order: Agaricales
- Family: Strophariaceae
- Genus: Leratiomyces
- Species: L. ceres

Binomial name
- Leratiomyces ceres (Cooke & Masee) Spooner & Bridge (2008)

Synonyms
- Agaricus squamosus f. aurantiacus sensu auct. Psilocybe aurantiaca sensu auct. Psilocybe ceres (Cooke & Massee) Sacc. 1891; Stropharia percevalii var. aurantiaca sensu auct. Stropholoma aurantiacum sensu auct.

= Leratiomyces ceres =

Species of fungus

Leratiomyces ceres
- Mycological characteristics
- Gills on hymenium
- Cap is convex or flat
- Hymenium is adnate
- Stipe has a ring
- Spore print is purple-brown
- Ecology is saprotrophic
- Edibility is unknown

Leratiomyces ceres, commonly known as the chip cherry or redlead roundhead, is a mushroom which has a bright red to orange cap and dark purple-brown spore deposit. The name Stropharia aurantiaca has been used extensively but incorrectly for this mushroom (together with a number of similar synonyms).

It is usually found growing gregariously on wood chips and is one of the most common and most distinctive mushrooms found in that habitat. It is common on wood chips and lawns in North America, Europe, Australia, New Zealand and elsewhere.

== Taxonomy ==
There has been some confusion between L. ceres, which has a fairly thick white stem, and L. squamosus var. thaustus, which has a slender stem and prominent scales below the ring zone (although the two taxa are quite easy to distinguish by sight). Around 1885 Mordecai Cubitt Cooke originated the names Agaricus squamosus f. aurantiacus and Agaricus thraustus var. aurantiacus, and this later gave rise to the name Stropharia aurantiaca. This name is defined by Cooke's illustration to his Handbook of British Fungi and in 2004 Richard Fortey discovered that this illustration was not of L. ceres, as had generally been assumed, but it was L. squamosus var. thaustus. Thus the name aurantiaca is best avoided, being wrong when applied to L. ceres.

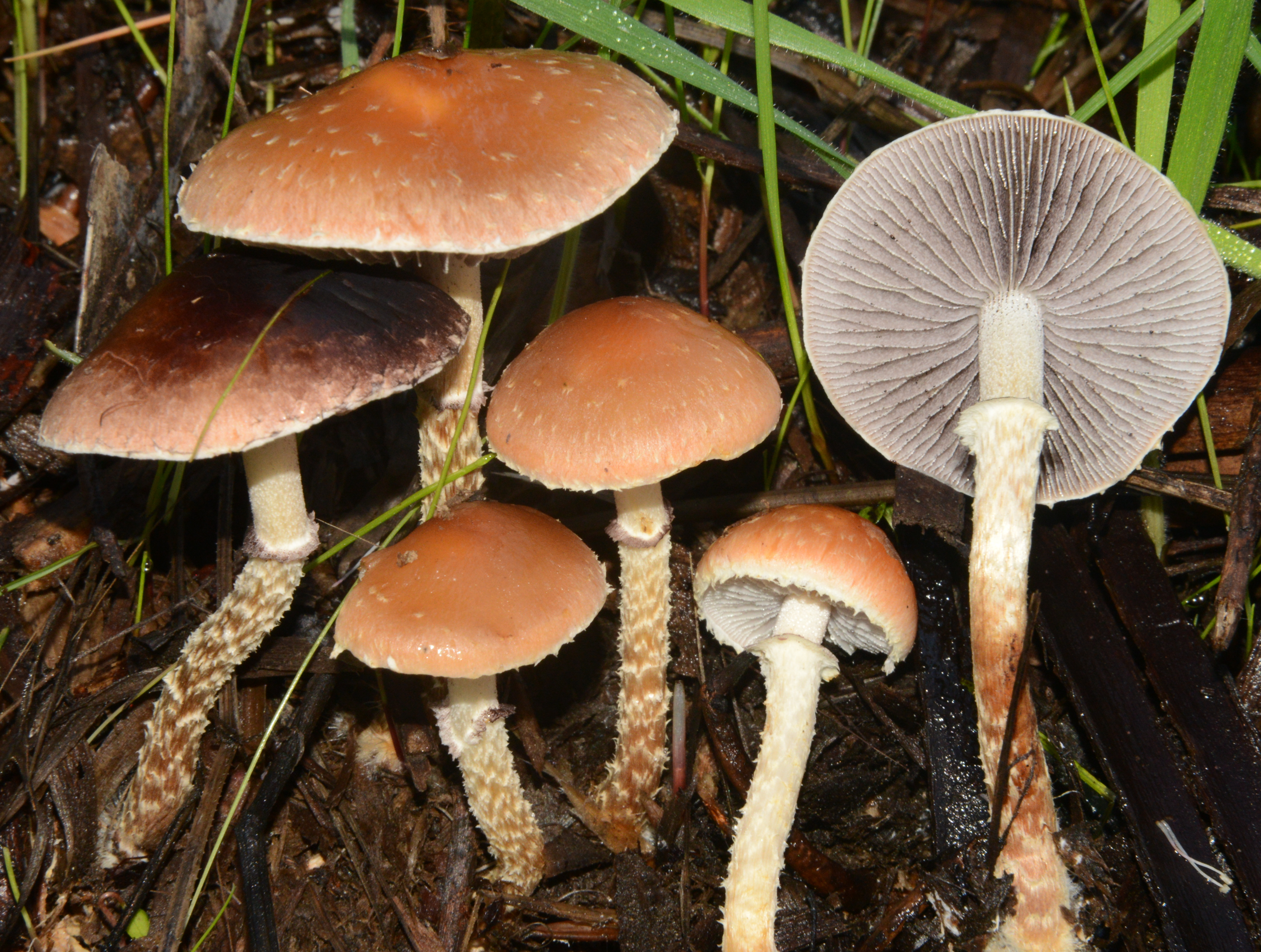
L. squamosus var. thaustus

The name Agaricus ceres was created in 1888 by Cooke and Massee for the white-stemmed species, and was reclassified as Psilocybe ceres (in 1891) and Leratiomyces ceres (in 2008).

== Description ==
L. ceres may be described as follows.

- Cap: 2 to 6 cm in diameter, with thin flesh and a bright red to orange top which is convex to plane in age. Has white partial veil remnants when young. The cap surface is usually dry, but can be slightly viscid when moist.
- Gills: White to pale grey at first, later darker purple/brown or purplish grey with whitish edges. Attached (adnexed to adnate) and often notched.
- Stipe: Whitish, often with dark orange stains in age (most evident around base), 3–6 cm long and 0.5 to 1 cm wide, equal to slightly larger at the base, which often has mycelium attached. The veil is thin and leaves a fragile, indistinct ring, sometimes missing with age. The stalk is smooth above the ring zone and is fluffy with tiny scales below, which often wash off in rain.
- Spores: Dark purple/brown. 10–13.5 × 6–8.5 m. Elliptical and smooth.
- Other microscopic features: Chrysocystidia are present both on the edges and on the faces of the gills.
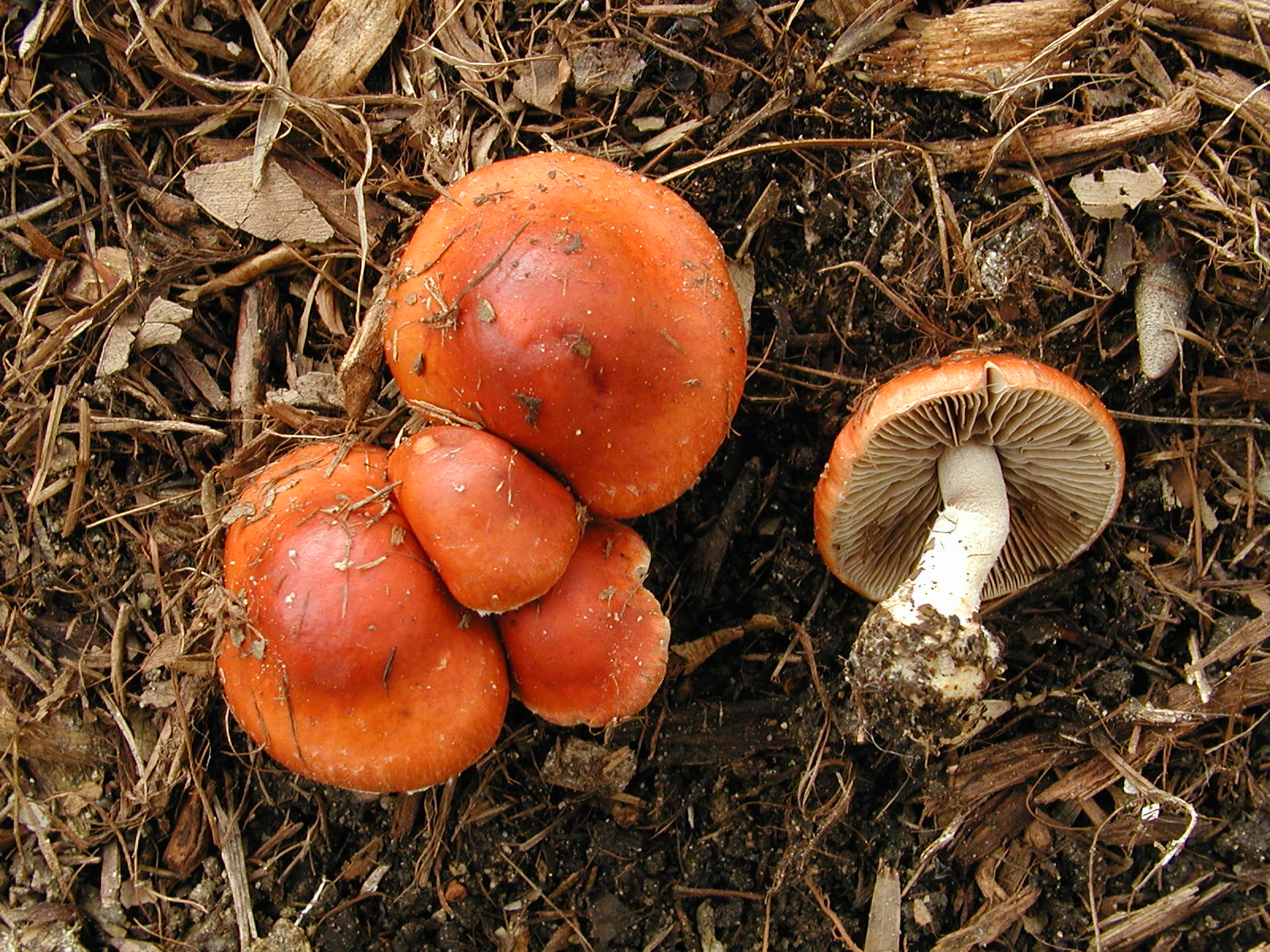
L. ceres

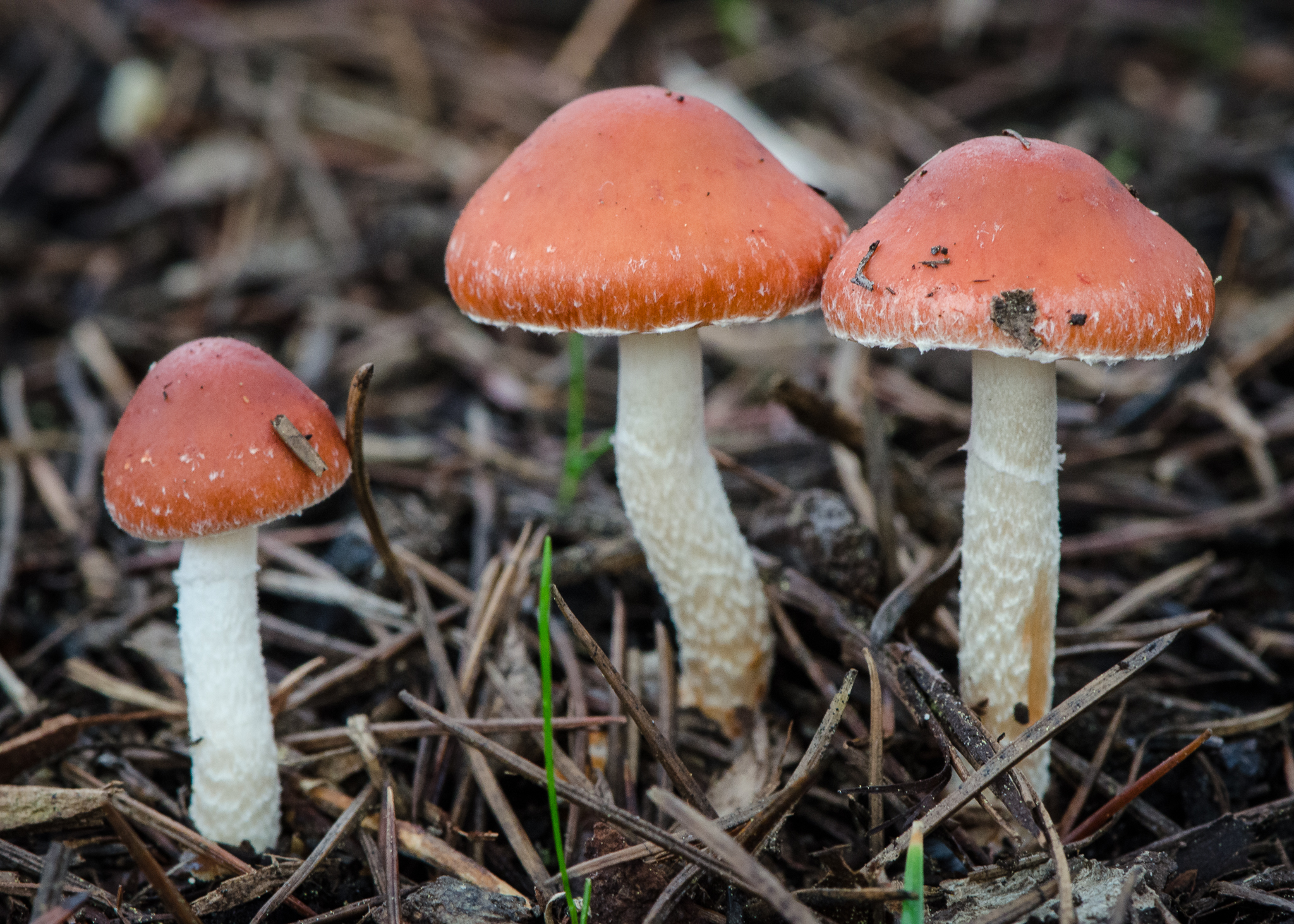

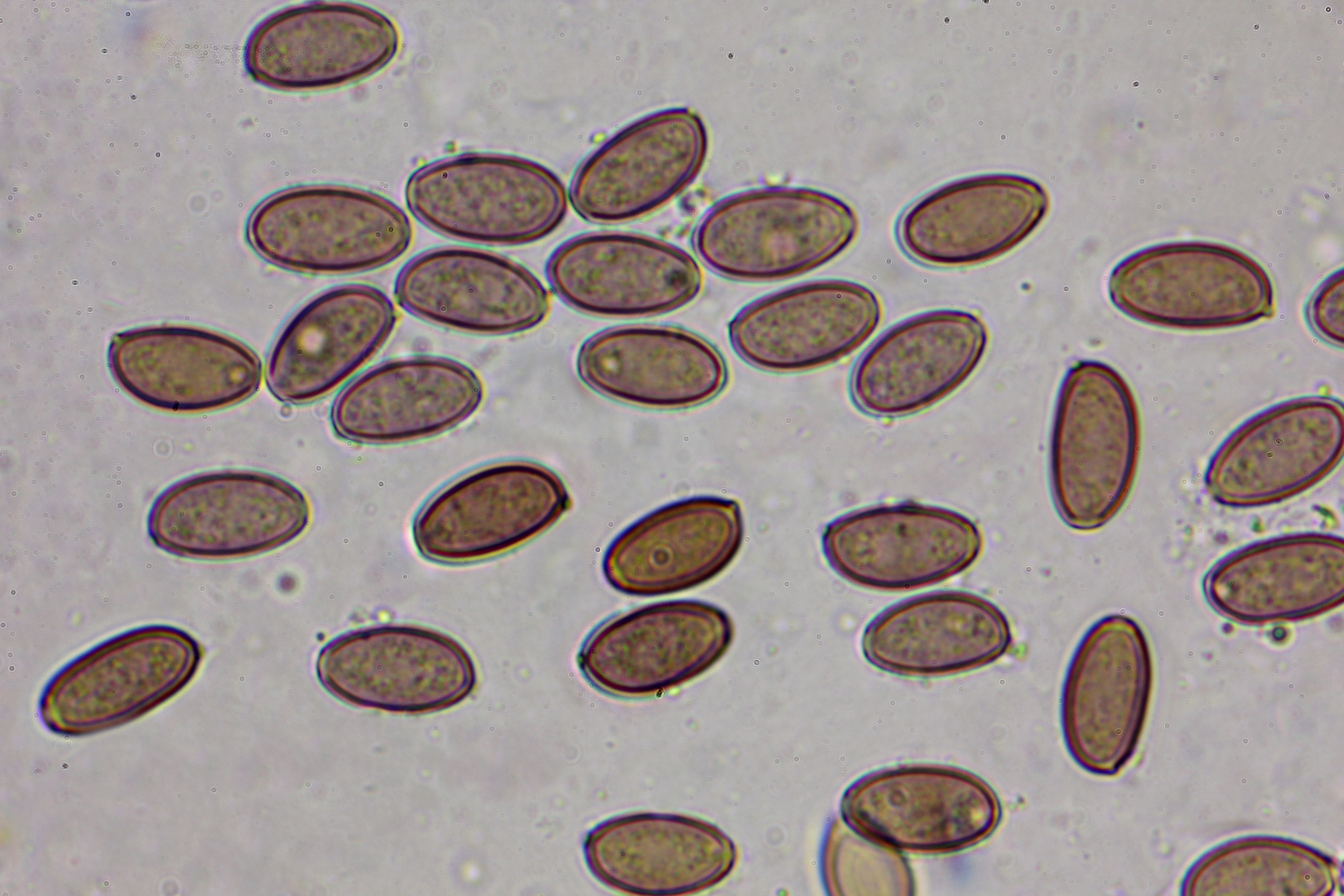
Spores 1000×

=== Similar species ===
Similar species include L. squamosus, Agrocybe putaminum, Gymnopilus sapineus, Psathyrella corrugis, Stropharia squamosa, S. thrausta, and Tubaria furfuracea.

In psilocybin mushroom hunting communities in Australia and New Zealand, L. ceres (known locally as "Larrys") are scorned as imposters of Psilocybe species. Prolific growth in the same habitats and a similar appearance from afar can give false hope of a large bounty, but on closer inspection the species are not particularly alike.

== Habitat and distribution ==
It is usually found growing gregariously on wood chips and is one of the most common and most distinctive mushrooms found in that habitat. It is somewhat common in parts of North America, Europe, Australia and New Zealand
