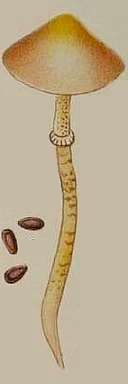
- Stropharia albonitens, extract of a photographic reproduction of an illustration of various Stropharia species

Scientific classification
- Domain: Eukaryota
- Kingdom: Fungi
- Division: Basidiomycota
- Class: Agaricomycetes
- Order: Agaricales
- Family: Strophariaceae
- Genus: Stropharia
- Species: S. albonitens

Binomial name
- Stropharia albonitens (Fr.) Quél. (1875)

Synonyms
- Agaricus albonitens Fr. (1857)

= Stropharia albonitens =

Species of fungus

Stropharia albonitens is an inedible mushroom found in grassy fields, lawns, and frequently along roadsides in North America and Europe. The spore print is purplish to black. It is white to cream or yellow in colour. It is typically 5 to 15 cm long with a ring on its stem and grows from July to November.

The spores are ellipsoid and range in measurement from 8–9 × 4–5 µm.

This species was published in Champs Jura Vosges 3: 439 (1875) and was originally named Agaricus albonitens in 1857 by Elias Magnus Fries.
