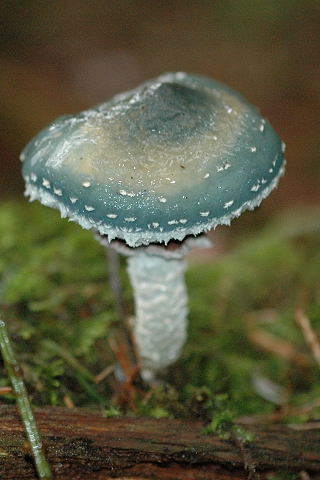

Scientific classification
- Kingdom: Fungi
- Division: Basidiomycota
- Class: Agaricomycetes
- Order: Agaricales
- Family: Strophariaceae
- Genus: Stropharia
- Species: S. aeruginosa

Binomial name
- Stropharia aeruginosa (Curtis) Quel.

= Stropharia aeruginosa =

Species of fungus

Stropharia aeruginosa
- Mycological characteristics
- Gills on hymenium
- Cap is convex or conical
- Hymenium is adnate
- Stipe is bare
- Spore print is purple-brown
- Edibility is not recommended

Stropharia aeruginosa, commonly known as the blue-green stropharia, or verdigris agaric, is a medium-sized green, slimy woodland mushroom, found on lawns, mulch and woodland from spring to autumn. The edibility of this mushroom is controversial; some sources claim that it is edible, while others claim it to be poisonous, although the inventory of natural products contained within this species is poorly understood.

== Taxonomy ==
The French mycologist Lucien Quélet gave the species its current binomial name in 1872, after it was initially described as Agaricus aeruginosus by William Curtis in 1784. The Dutch mycologist Machiel Noordeloos placed it in the genus Psilocybe in 1995. The specific epithet aerūgǐnōsa is Latin for "covered in verdigris".

== Description ==
The cap is convex, broadening, and becoming umbonate with age. It is 2–8 centimetres (3/4–3 1/4 in) wide. At first it is a vivid blue/green, and very glutinous (slimy), with a sprinkling of white veil remnants around the edge. The colour in the gluten fades, or is washed off as it matures, and it becomes yellow ocher, sometimes in patches, but mostly at the centre. Finally, it will lose the blue-green coloration completely. The white stem is quite long and of uniform thickness. It has a fragile brown/black ring, and below this the stem is covered in fine white scales, or flakes. The gills are initially white, then clay-brown, and sometimes have a white edge. The spore print is brownish-purple, and the oval spores 7–10 x 5 μm.

=== Similar species ===
- Stropharia caerulea Kreisel – a dowdier cousin.
- Stropharia pseudocyanea (Desm.) Morgan – a smaller; slighter, but strikingly similar grassland species, with a very fleeting ring.

Psilocybe species stain blue and lack scaly stems.

== Distribution and habitat ==
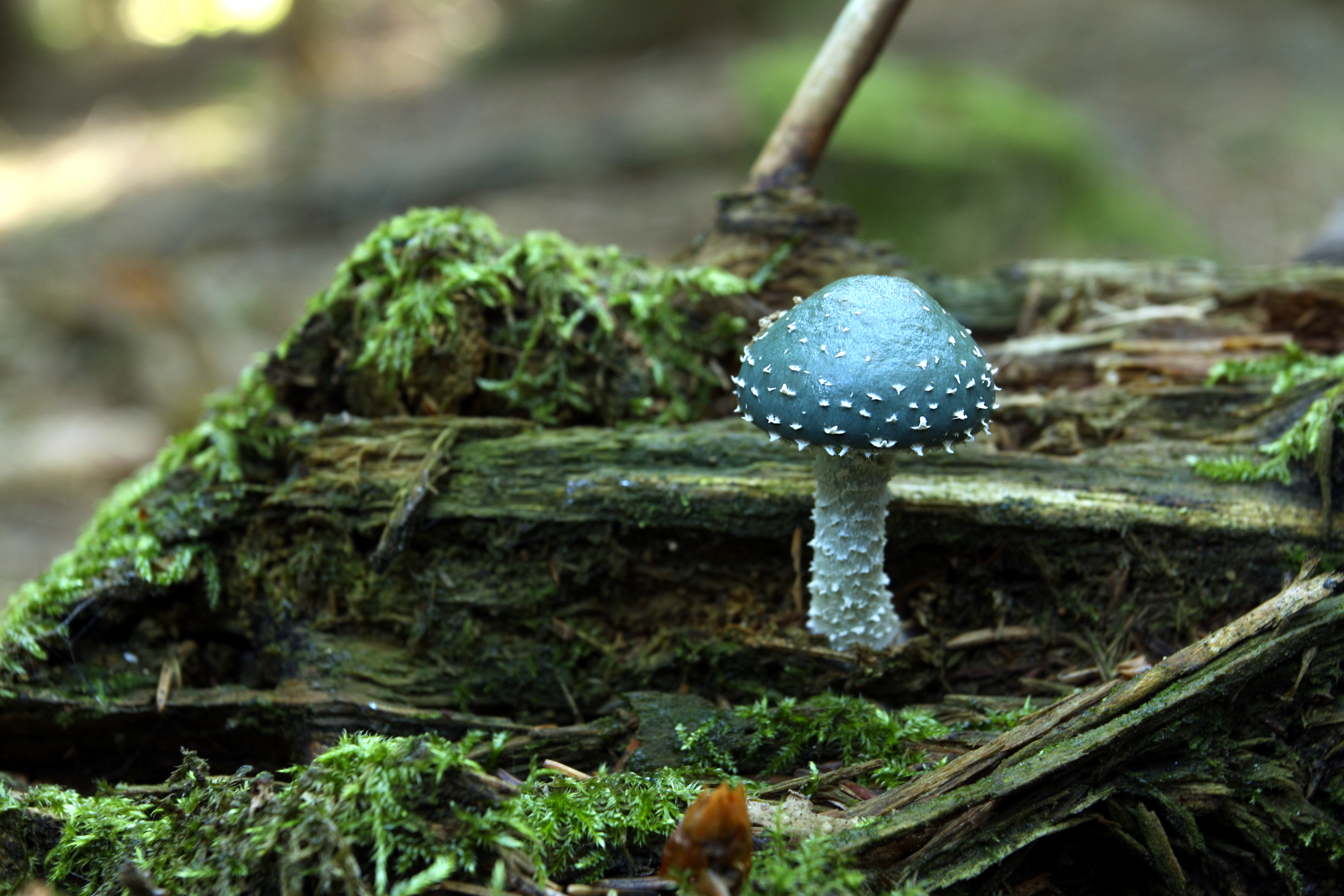
Stropharia aeruginosa in the Czech Republic

This mushroom is common in grassy woods, and on roadside verges in Europe including Britain, Asia (Iran) and parts of North America, growing on rotting wood. It particularly favours wood-chip mulches in gardens, and parks.

== Edibility and toxicity ==
The verdigris agaric is reported as poisonous in many guidebooks printed in the Western Hemisphere, but the effect of poisoning and toxic constituents are unclear.

According to some European guidebooks the verdigris agaric is edible, but undesirable to some due to a mildly spicy taste.
