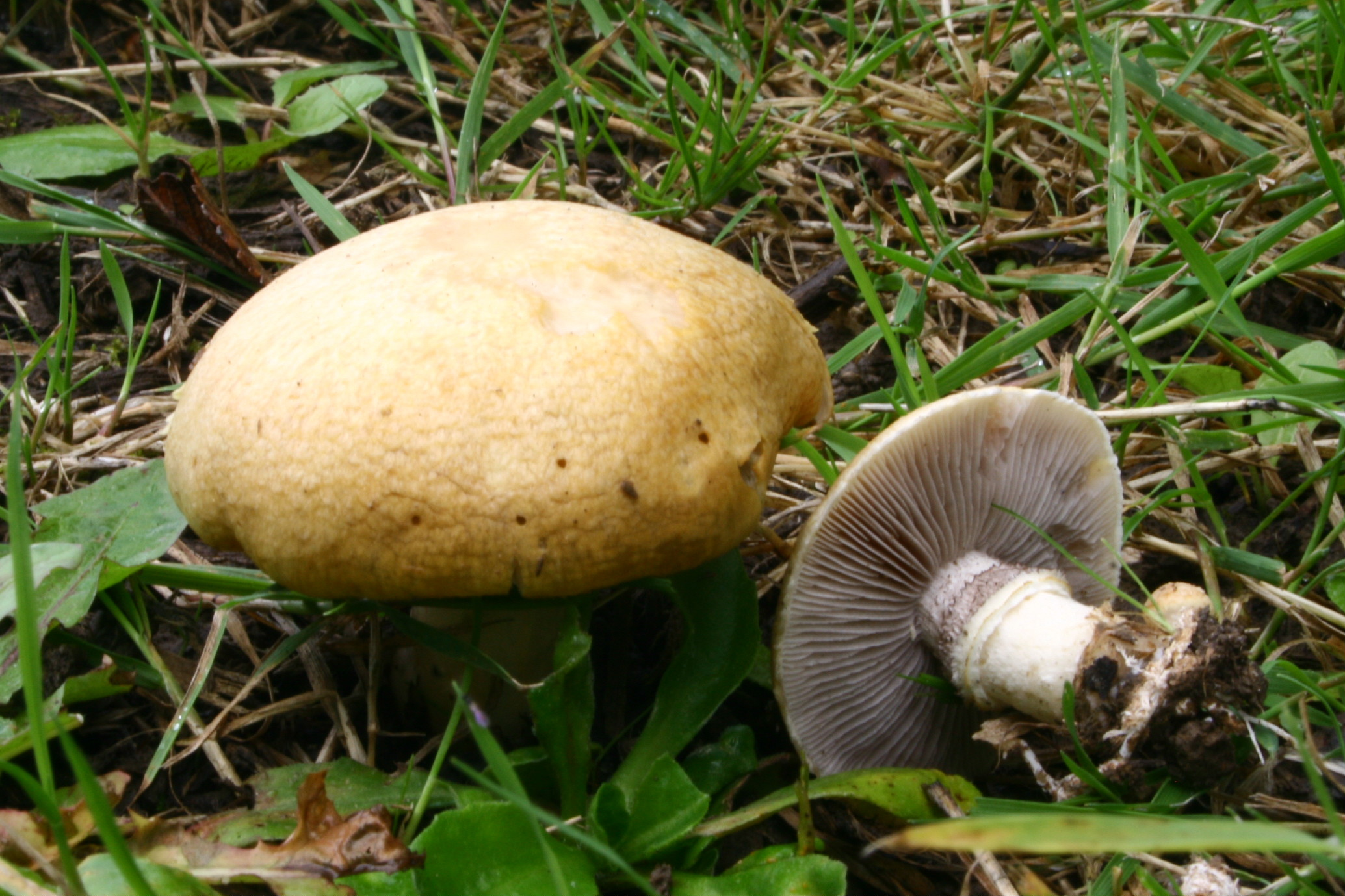

Scientific classification
- Kingdom: Fungi
- Division: Basidiomycota
- Class: Agaricomycetes
- Order: Agaricales
- Family: Strophariaceae
- Genus: Stropharia
- Species: S. coronilla

Binomial name
- Stropharia coronilla (Bull.) Quél.

Synonyms
- List: Psilocybe coronilla (Bull.) Noordel.; Geophila coronilla (Bull.) Quél.; Fungus coronillus (Bull. ex DC.) Kuntze; Agaricus coronillus Bull. ex DC.; Stropharia coronilla (Bull.) W. Saunders & W.G. Sm.; Agaricus coronilla Bull.; Agaricus horizontalis Joach. Pauli

= Stropharia coronilla =

Species of fungus

Stropharia coronilla
- Mycological characteristics
- Gills on hymenium
- Cap is convex or flat
- Hymenium is adnexed
- Stipe has a ring
- Spore print is blackish-brown
- Ecology is saprotrophic
- Edibility is poisonous

Stropharia coronilla, commonly known as the garland roundhead or garland stropharia, is a species of fungus.

The yellowish cap is up to 6 centimetres (2 1/4 in) wide. The gills are grayish and darken with age. The stem is up to 6 cm long and 1 cm thick. It resembles Agrocybe dura, some other members of its genus, plus some in Agaricus and Protostropharia.

Native to Europe and North America, it is considered poisonous.
