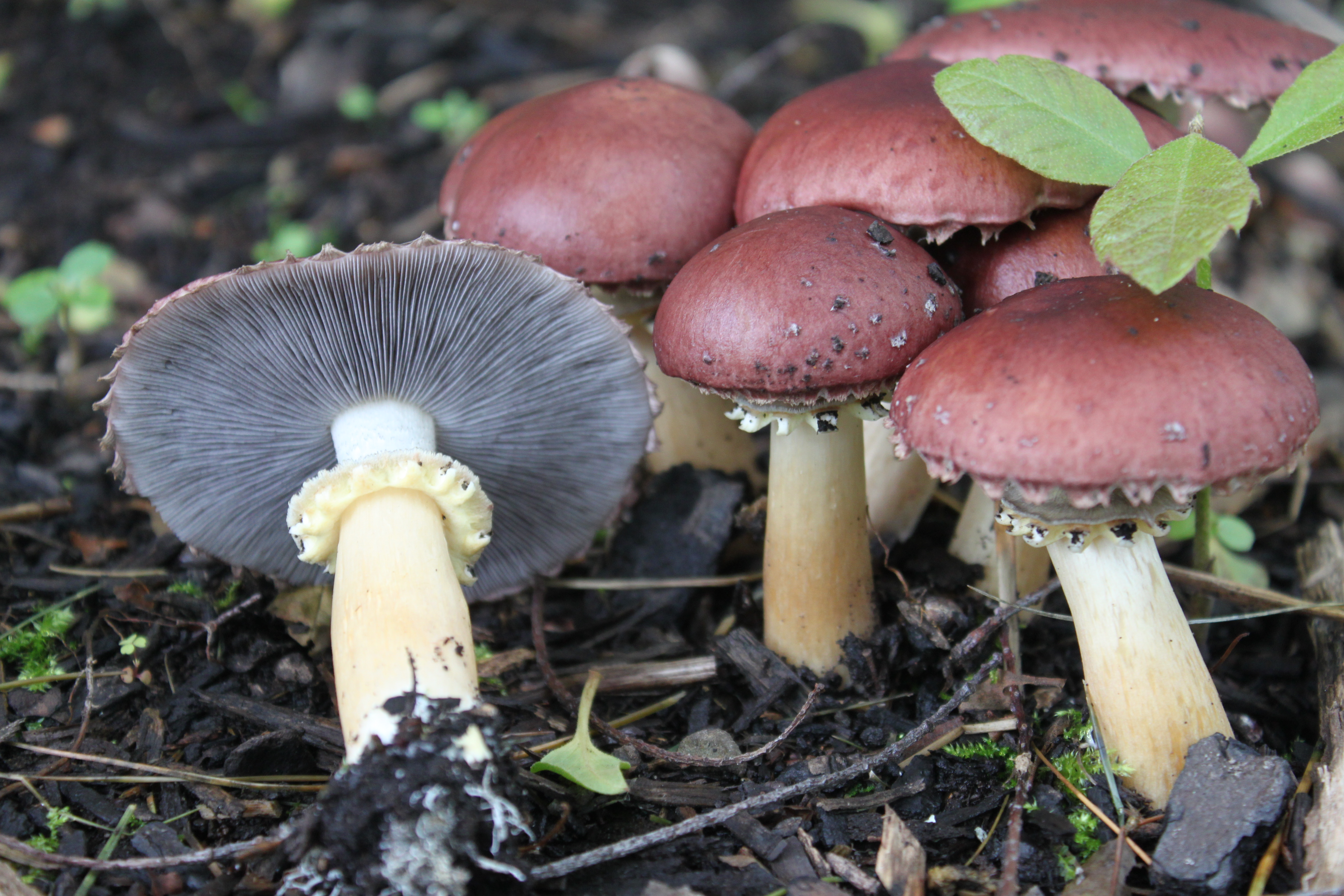

Scientific classification
- Kingdom: Fungi
- Division: Basidiomycota
- Class: Agaricomycetes
- Order: Agaricales
- Family: Strophariaceae
- Genus: Stropharia
- Species: S. rugosoannulata

Binomial name
- Stropharia rugosoannulata Farlow ex Murrill (1922)

Synonyms
- Geophila rugosoannulata (Farl. ex Murrill) Kühner & Romagn. (1953); Naematoloma rugosoannulatum (Farl. ex Murrill) S.Ito (1959); Psilocybe rugosoannulata (Farl. ex Murrill) Noordel. (1995)

= Stropharia rugosoannulata =

Species of fungus

Stropharia rugosoannulata
- Mycological characteristics
- Gills on hymenium
- Cap is convex or flat
- Hymenium is adnate
- Stipe has a ring
- Spore print is purple-brown
- Ecology is saprotrophic
- Edibility is choice

Stropharia rugosoannulata, commonly known as the wine cap, wine-red stropharia, wine cap stropharia, garden giant, burgundy mushroom, or king stropharia, is a species of agaric mushroom in the family Strophariaceae found in North America. It is regarded as a choice edible.

== Etymology ==
The specific epithet, which means "wrinkled-ringed", is a reference to the wrinkled annulus of the fruiting body.

== Description ==
The mushroom can grow to 20 centimetres (8 inches) high with a reddish-brown convex to flattening cap up to 30 cm (12 in) across, the size leading to another colloquial name godzilla mushroom. The gills are typically adnate, initially pale, then grey and finally dark purple-brown in colour. The spore print is dark purple-brown to black.

The firm flesh is white, as is the tall stem, which bears a wrinkled ring.

=== Similar species ===
It can resemble some members of its genus, such as S. hornemannii, as well as Agaricus (the gills of which are usually more pink).

== Distribution and habitat ==
The species is found on wood chips across North America in summer and autumn. It is also found in Europe, and has been introduced to Australia and New Zealand.

== Ecology ==
Paul Stamets's book Mycelium Running cites a study by Christiane Pischl showing that the species makes an excellent garden companion to corn. The fungus also has a history of being grown with corn in Europe.

A 2006 study, published in the journal Applied and Environmental Microbiology, found the species to have the ability to attack the nematode Panagrellus redivivus; the fungus produces spiny cells called acanthocytes, which are able to immobilise and digest the nematodes.

== Uses ==
Described as a very tasty edible mushroom by some authors, it is easily cultivated on a medium similar to that on which it grows naturally. Antonio Carluccio recommends sautéeing them in butter or grilling them.
