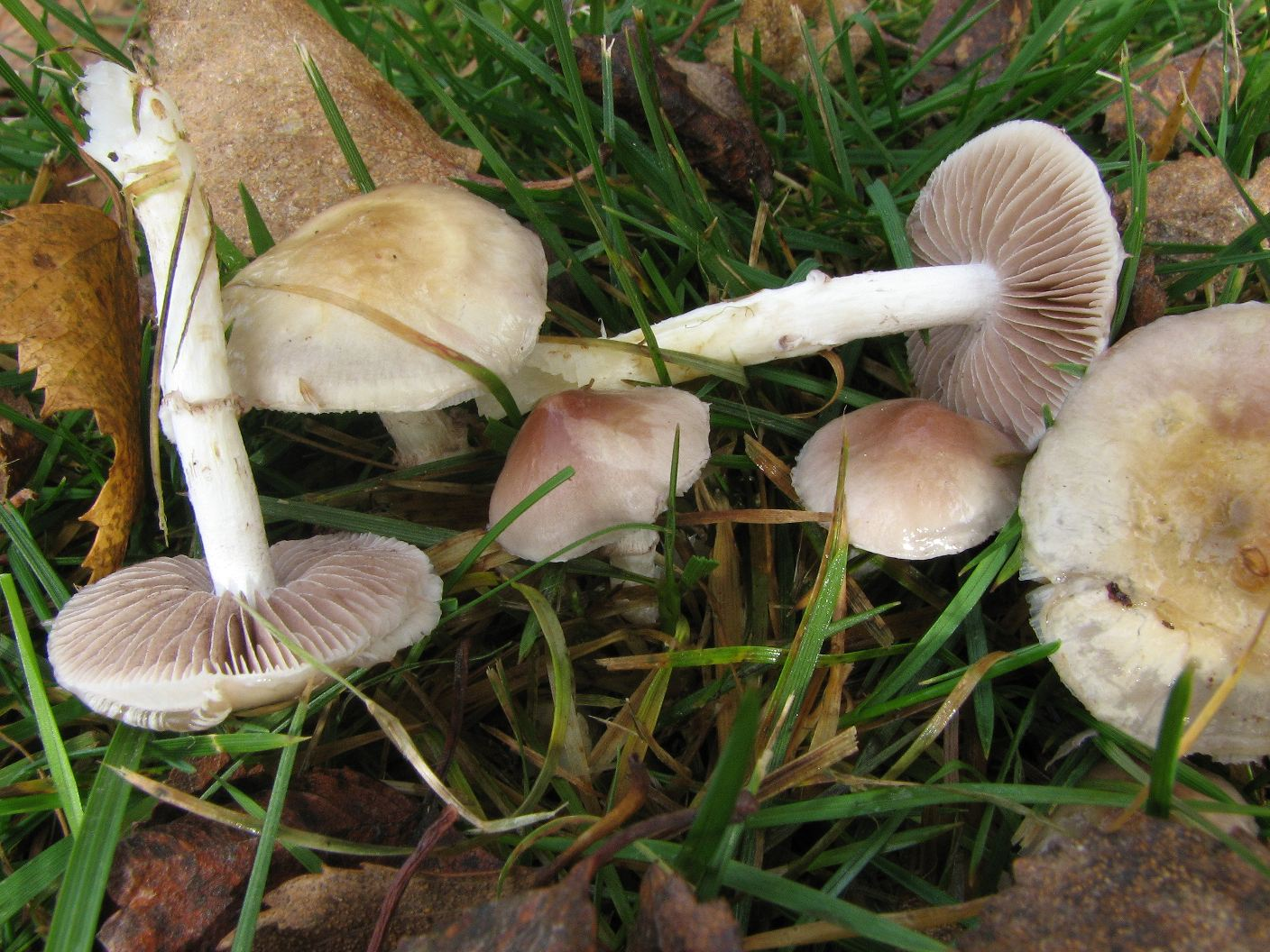

Scientific classification
- Domain: Eukaryota
- Kingdom: Fungi
- Division: Basidiomycota
- Class: Agaricomycetes
- Order: Agaricales
- Family: Strophariaceae
- Genus: Stropharia
- Species: S. inuncta

Binomial name
- Stropharia inuncta (Fr.) Quél. (1872)

Synonyms
- Agaricus inunctus Fr. (1828)

= Stropharia inuncta =

Species of fungus

Stropharia inuncta is a species of mushroom native to Europe.
