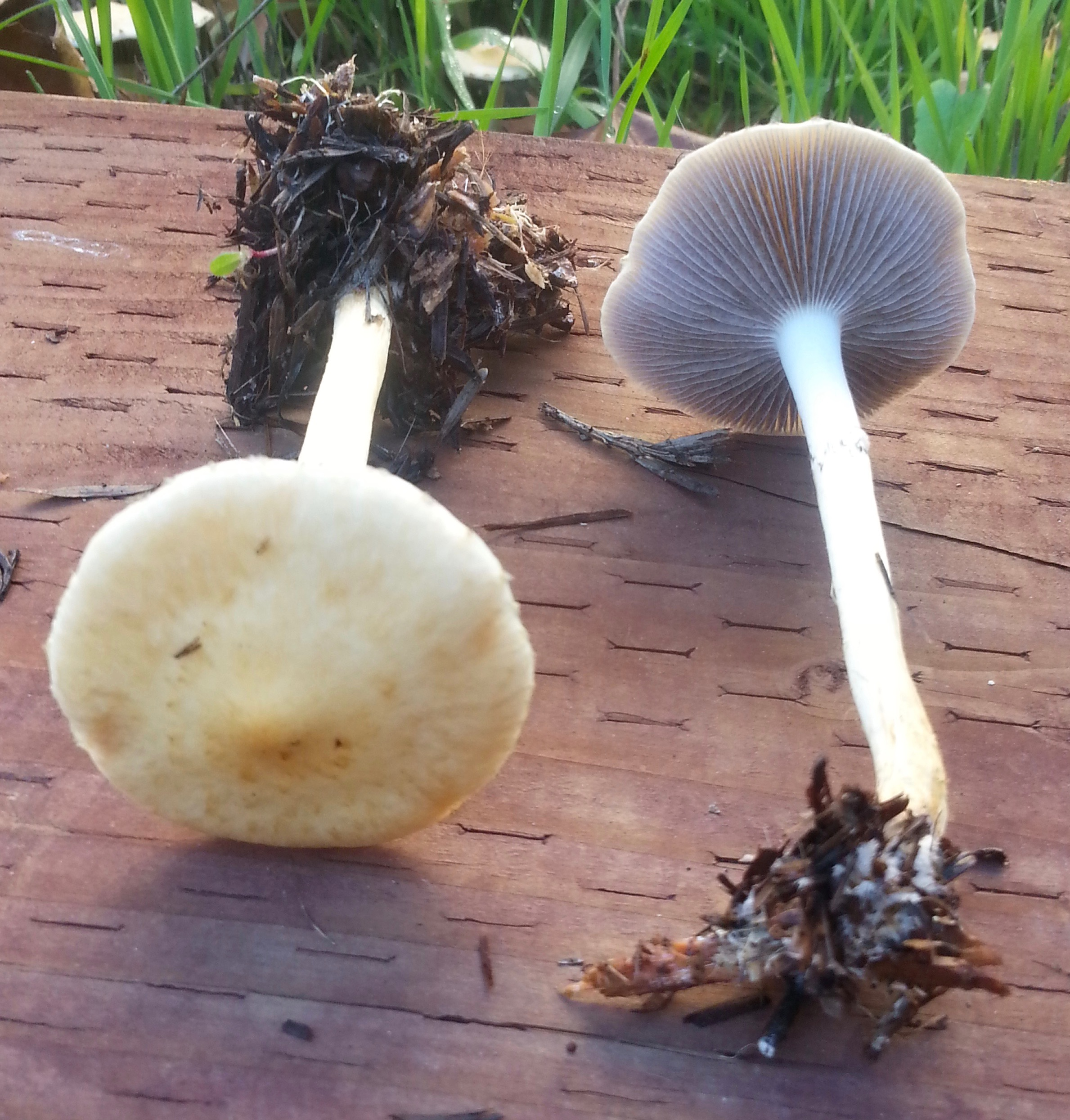

Scientific classification
- Kingdom: Fungi
- Division: Basidiomycota
- Class: Agaricomycetes
- Order: Agaricales
- Family: Strophariaceae
- Genus: Leratiomyces
- Species: L. percevalii

Binomial name
- Leratiomyces percevalii (Berk. & Broome) Bridge & Spooner

= Leratiomyces percevalii =

Species of fungus

Leratiomyces percevalii
- Mycological characteristics
- Gills on hymenium
- Cap is campanulate or umbonate
- Hymenium attachment is not applicable or adnate
- Stipe has a ring
- Spore print is purple-black
- Ecology is saprotrophic
- Edibility is unknown

Leratiomyces percevalii, commonly known as mulch maid, is a medium-sized saprobic mushroom. Its cap is up to 8 centimetres (3 1/4 in) wide, yellowish-orange, bun-shaped then bell-shaped, becoming shallowly convex. Its gills are adnexed to shortly decurrent and whitish to purplish gray or purple-blackish. It is common in urban areas and near trails and roads, as well as under conifers in western North America. Its edibility is unknown.
