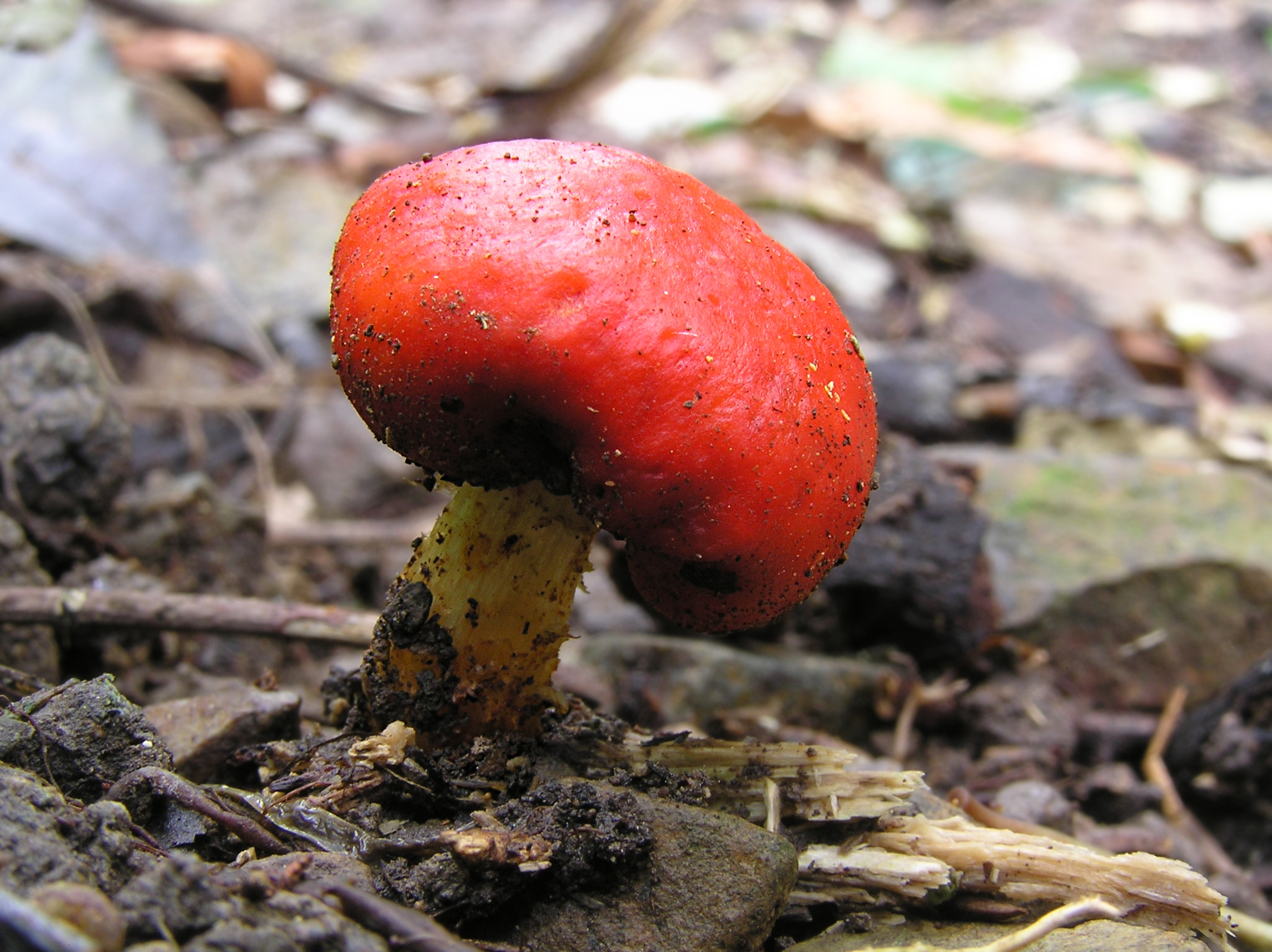
- Leratiomyces erythrocephalus

Scientific classification
- Kingdom: Fungi
- Division: Basidiomycota
- Class: Agaricomycetes
- Order: Agaricales
- Family: Strophariaceae
- Genus: Leratiomyces; Bresinsky & Manfr.Binder ex Bridge, Spooner, Beever & D.C.Park (2008)

Type species
- Leratiomyces similis (Pat. ex Sacc. & Trotter) Bresinsky & Manfr. Binder ex Redhead & McNeill (2008)

Synonyms
- Nematoloma sect. Stropholoma Singer (1948); "Stropholoma" nom. invalid. Balletto (1989)

= Leratiomyces =

Genus of fungi

Leratiomyces is a genus of mushroom-forming basidiomycetes first proposed three times under invalid names, and finally validated in 2008. It includes several formerly described, variously, from the genera Stropharia, Hypholoma, and Weraroa. It was formerly classified as Stropharia section Stropholoma, though some authorities placed this section in the genus Hypholoma, as these species often have features that are intermediate between the two genera.

The genus name of Leratiomyces is in honour of Auguste Le Rat (1872-1910), who was a French teacher, and in 1904 was the curator of the Museums in Nouméa, New Caledonia.

The genus was circumscribed by Andreas Bresinsky, Manfred Binder, Paul Dennis Bridge, Brian Martin Spooner, Ross Ewen Beever and Duck Chul Park in Mycotaxon vol.103 on page 115 in 2008.

This group includes a number of mushrooms found commonly in woodchip beds and dry grasslands or sandy soils, such as Leratiomyces ceres and L. percevalii. It also includes a number of secotioid species, including the type species, L. similis, as well as L. cucullatus, L. erythrocephalus and L. laetissimus.

== Species ==
- L. atrovirens
- L. ceres
- L. coccineus
- L. cucullatus
- L. erythrocephalus
- L. laetissimus
- L. magnivelaris
- L. percevalii
- L. riparius
- L. similis
- L. smaragdinus
- L. squamosus
