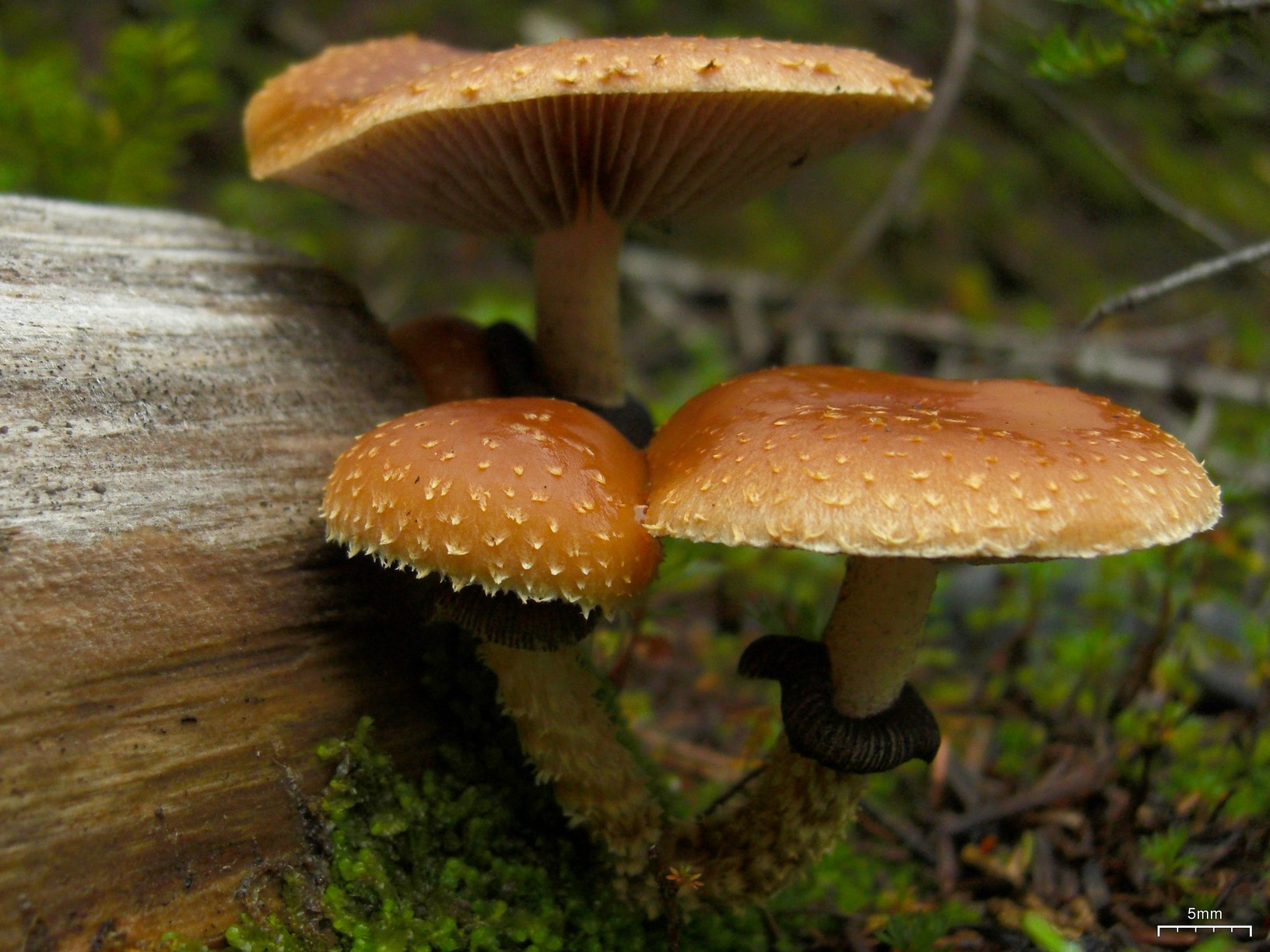
- Leratiomyces squamosus var. squamosus

Scientific classification
- Kingdom: Fungi
- Division: Basidiomycota
- Class: Agaricomycetes
- Order: Agaricales
- Family: Strophariaceae
- Genus: Leratiomyces
- Species: L. squamosus

Binomial name
- Leratiomyces squamosus Bridge & Spooner 2008

Varieties
- L. squamosus var. squamosus L. squamosus var. thraustus

Synonyms
- Agaricus squamosus Geophila squamosa Hypholoma squamosum Naematoloma squamosum Psalliota squamosa Psilocybe squamosa Stropharia squamosa Stropholoma squamosum

= Leratiomyces squamosus =

Leratiomyces squamosus
- Mycological characteristics
- Gills on hymenium
- Cap is convex
- Hymenium is adnate
- Stipe has a ring
- Spore print is purple-black
- Ecology is saprotrophic
- Edibility is unknown

Leratiomyces squamosus, commonly known as the slender roundhead, is an inedible mushroom in the family Strophariaceae.

== Description ==
The cap of Leratiomyces squamosus is about 2-6 centimeters in diameter, and starts out conical. It then becomes convex or flat. When young, it often has remnants of the veil. The stipe is about 4-10 centimeters long and 0.3-0.7 centimeters wide, with a ring around it. Below the ring, there are a lot of tufts. The gills start out grayish, becoming purplish black as the mushroom matures. The spore print is purplish black.

== Habitat and ecology ==
Leratiomyces squamosus is often found in mulch and forests. It usually grows in alkaline environments.
