= Otto Kuntze =

German botanist (1843–1907)

Carl Ernst Otto Kuntze
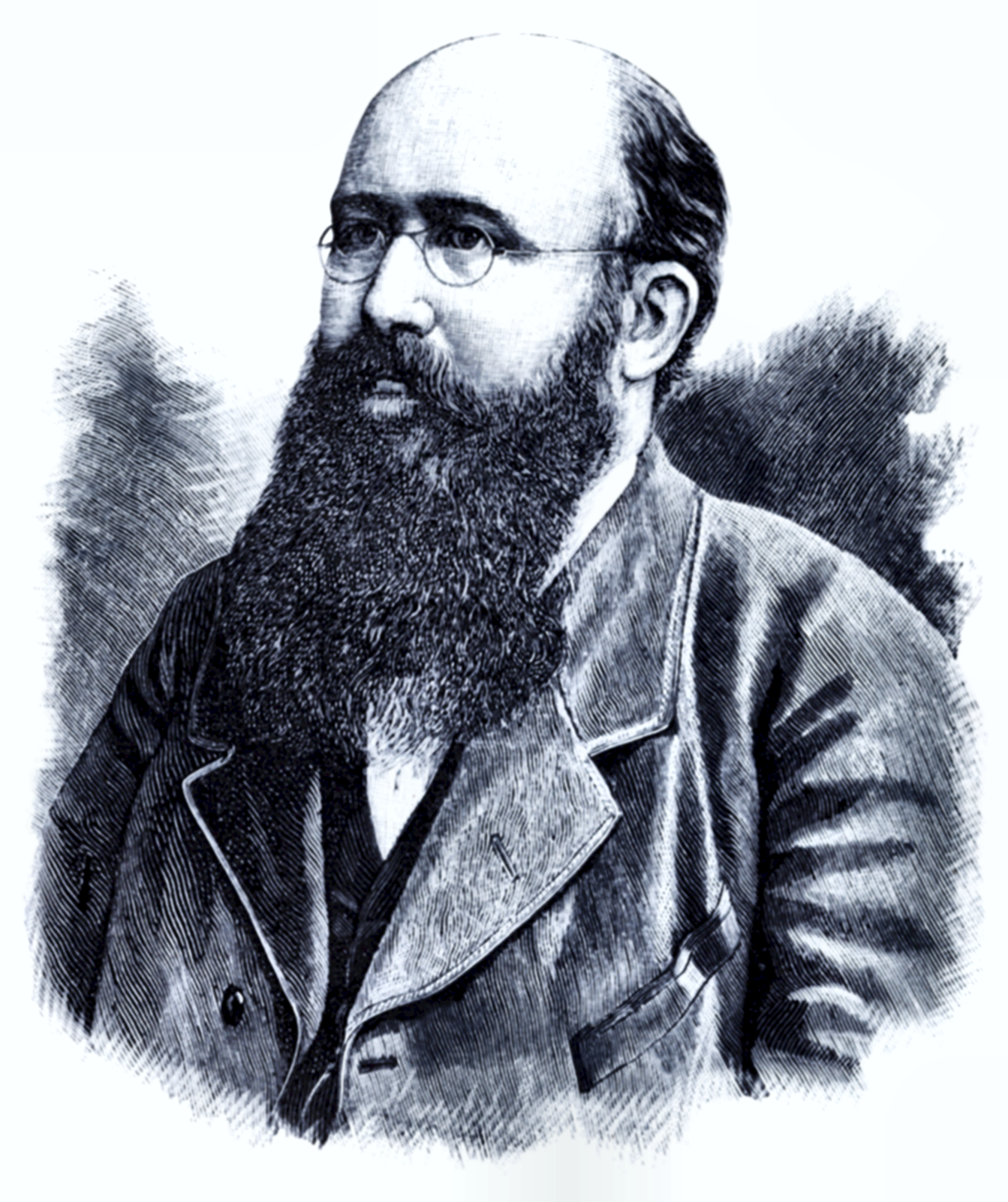
- Born: June 23, 1843; Leipzig, Kingdom of Saxony
- Died: January 27, 1907 (aged 63); San Remo, Italy
- Education: University of Freiburg (PhD)
- Spouse: Helene Kuntze
- Scientific career
- Fields: Botany
- Thesis: Monographie der Gattung Cinchona L. (1878)
- Academic advisors: J. A. Schenk; P. F. A. Ascherson; P. W. Magnus, H. Credner; C. Luerssen
- Author abbrev. (botany): Kuntze

Carl Ernst Otto Kuntze (23 June 1843 – 27 January 1907) was a German businessman and botanist. He went on a round-the-world plant collecting trip from 1874 to 1876 making extensive collections from South America and Asia. His major contribution was a three volume revision of plant genera Revisio Generum Plantarum (1891). This revision troubled many botanists because of the changes he suggested to nearly 30000 taxa, many which were contrary to the rules established by the botanical congress of 1867. This however forced botanists to make reforms to the botanical code.

== Life and work ==
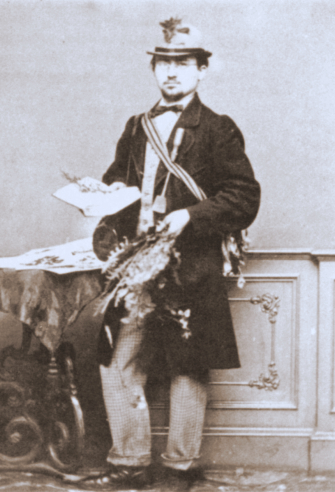
In 1867

Otto Kuntze was born in Leipzig and was educated in a Realschule followed by commercial training. He also attended courses for pharmacists. As a young boy he had already become interested in plants and had made collections in Leipzig. This allowed him to publish a Taschen-Flora von Leipzig (1867, "Pocket flora of Leipzig"). Between 1863 and 1866, he worked as clerk in a Berlin business and traveled through central Europe and Italy. He collaborated with Berlin botanists Alexander Braun (1805-1877) and Paul Ascherson (1834-1913) and produced a revision of the Rubus species in Germany. From 1868 to 1873, he started his own factory in Leipzig for essential oils and attained a comfortable standard of living within five years. In Leipzig, he took an interest in building codes and demographics of the city. Between 1874 and 1876, he traveled around the world: the Caribbean, United States, Japan, China, Southeast Asia, Arabian peninsula and Egypt. Apart from nearly 7700 plant specimens, he also made ethnological collections which he contributed to the Völkermuseum in Leipzig. The journal of these travels was published as Um die Erde ["Around the World"] (1881). Kuntze was largely self taught in botany. From 1876 to 1878, he formally studied Natural Science in Berlin and Leipzig under J. A. Schenk, P. F. A. Ascherso, P. W. Magnus, H. Credner and C. Luerssen. He gained his doctorate in Freiburg with a monograph on the genus Cinchona ("Monographie der Gattung Cinchona L."). In 1879 he wrote about his ideas on systematics and gave a theoretical framework for dealing with the genus Rubus in Methodik der Speciesbeschreibung und Rubus.

In 1886, Kuntze visited the Russian Near East and spent the 1887–88 period on the Canary Islands. The results of both journeys became part of his main work, the Revisio. He also published Plantae orientali-rossicae (Kuntze, 1887). At the beginning of the 1890s, he left for South America, of which he managed to see nearly all countries. In 1894, he visited the Southern African countries as well as the German colonies.

He edited the botanical collection from his world voyage encompassing 7,700 specimens in Berlin and Kew Gardens. The publication came as a shock to botanists, since Kuntze had entirely revised taxonomy. He changed the names of nearly 30000 taxa in his three-volume treatise, 2,226 page total, Revisio Generum Plantarum (1891-1898). It was widely rejected or deliberately ignored. There were nearly 50 publications between 1891 and 1893 criticizing his work and he tried to respond to them.

In 1894 he made a trip to Africa visiting South Africa, Mozambique, Tanganyika and Egypt. He returned sick with emphysema from which he suffered until his death. He moved his library and herbarium to Villa Girola, San Remo and lived there from 1896. He continued to respond to critics and attended the 1900 Botanical Congress in Paris. In 1904 he made another trip to Ceylon, Australia, New Zealand, Hawaii and the United States. He died in San Remo on 28 Jan 1907. His wife Helene outlived him, and sold his herbarium to the New York Botanical Garden in 1907, where much of it remains. Not all his types have been found.

=== Botanical systematics and impact ===
Although Kuntze stated that he was merely diligently applying standard practice, his revolutionary ideas about botanic nomenclature created a schism between competing sets of Rules of Botanical Nomenclature, the precursors of the modern International Code of Nomenclature for algae, fungi, and plants. Among his ideas was to consider 1737 as a starting date for determining priority. The conflict came to a head at the 2nd International Botanical Congress in 1905, two years before Kuntze's death. His uncompromising responses to differing views meant that the doors of much of the academic world, particularly in Europe, were closed to him.

Even for an era in which botanical and mycological texts were quite formal and rigid in their style; Kuntze's writing stands out as being especially dense and impenetrable. This can be seen in Revisio generum plantarum which consists largely of exhaustive lists of species and entire genera which he proposed were to be moved. Potential sources for the schism between Kuntze and the academic world can be seen in examples such as his proposition that Michel Adanson's pre-Linnaean system genus Fungus should be resurrected for numerous Agaricus and Stropharia species. In many cases, the species to be moved had already been reclassified numerous times with several proposed names but Kuntze appears to have disregarded these classifications and simply reclassified the basionym. As a result of this work, the taxonomic records are full of vast defunct genera in which not a single species name is currently accepted. Kuntze's major attempts at reclassification appear to have been influenced by the issues he saw with Linnaean taxonomy and perhaps even Linnaeus himself:

"Linné was a great researcher, an excellent observer, an astute thinker with a tremendous talent for systematics, a tireless worker, an engaging teacher, a sociable person, generally a staid character, but overly ambitious, like even Gistel (cf. his book, Carolus Linnaeus, ein Lebenbild), which one must take for a Linnaeus enthusiast, admits. Easily accessible to flattery, very sensitive to neglect of acknowledgment, not tolerant of contradiction, feeling himself an autocrat, he often unnecessarily changed names (even those which he himself had previously adopted) and punished his opponents and non-admirers by neglecting the names they had adopted or newly created. He even considered it permissible to rename new genera established by contemporaries when he included them in his nomenclature, or to apply their names to quite different plants; in this way he monopolized his nomenclature."

— Otto Kuntze, Revisio generum plantarum Vol. 1 (1891), Translated from German

Whilst widely rejected, Kuntze's work cast a strong light on the inadequacy of previous approaches to botanical nomenclature. A group of American botanists developed an alternative set of rules, the Rochester Code, which they proposed in 1892 as an alternative to the International Rules. This schism was not resolved until 1930.

== Biographical articles ==
- Barnhart, John Hendley (1913). "Otto Kuntze". Bulletin of the Charleston Museum. Vol. 9. pp. 65–68.
- Urban, Ignaz (1902). "Symbolae Antillanae". Notae Biographicae (in Latin) (3): 70..
- Hemsley, W.B. (1907). "Dr. Otto Kuntze". Kew Bulletin of Miscellaneous Information. pp. 100–101.
- Stafleu, Frans A. (1978). "Kuntze, Carl Ernst Otto". Dictionary of Scientific Biography. Vol. 15. pp. 268–69.
