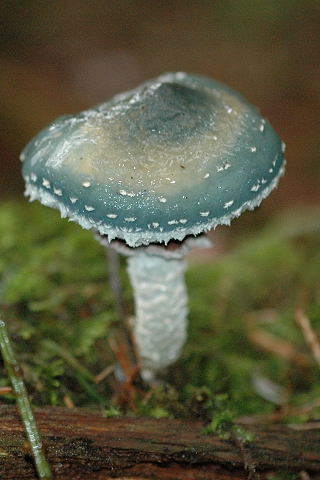
- Stropharia aeruginosa

Scientific classification
- Kingdom: Fungi
- Division: Basidiomycota
- Class: Agaricomycetes
- Order: Agaricales
- Family: Strophariaceae
- Genus: Stropharia (Fr.) Quél. (1872)

Type species
- Stropharia aeruginosa (Curtis) Quél. (1872)

Synonyms
- Agaricus subgen. Stropharia Fr. (1849); Geophila Quél. (1886)

= Stropharia =

Genus of fungi

The genus Stropharia (sometimes known by the common name roundheads) is a group of medium to large agarics with a distinct membranous ring on the stipe. Well-known members of this genus include the edible Stropharia rugosoannulata and the blue-green verdigris agarics (Stropharia aeruginosa and allies). Stropharia are not generally regarded as good to eat and there are doubts over the edibility of several species. However the species Stropharia rugosoannulata is regarded as prized and delicious when young and is now the premier mushroom for outdoor bed culture by mycophiles in temperate climates.

== Taxonomy ==
The scientific name is derived from the Greek 'στροφος/strophos' meaning "belt", in reference to the annulus present on the stipe. Spore print color is generally medium to dark purple-brown with a white edge at maturity, except for a few species that have rusty-brown spores. There is a great deal of variation, however, since this group as presently delimited is polyphyletic. Members of the core clade of Stropharia are characterized by crystalline acanthocytes among the hyphae of the mycelium that make up the rhizoids at the base of the mushroom, and in one species, Stropharia acanthocystis, also occur in the hymenium.

== Description ==
Recent molecular work shows the core group of the genus most closely related to Hypholoma and Pholiota. Others such as S. semiglobata are more distantly related. Stropharia had been divided into 'sections' by Rolf Singer among others, although some 'sections' were only informally named. Phylogenetically, some 'sections' have now been classified as separate genera by some authors for species lacking acanthocytes. Two examples of the reclassification of sections into genera are: Leratiomyces in 2008 in part replacing Section Stropholoma and Protostropharia in 2013 in part replacing section Stercophila.

The psychedelic mushroom formerly known as Stropharia cubensis was reclassified into the genus Psilocybe by mycologist Rolf Singer and subsequently, this classification was supported by modern phylogenetic analyses based upon DNA sequence comparison. It bears a superficial resemblance to Stropharia with its relatively large size, well-developed annulus, and dark spores, hence in some references it is referred to as Stropharia cubensis, However, it is simply a large-size example of the bluing Psilocybe and hence is not a close relative of Stropharia.

== Species ==
- Stropharia acanthocystis
- Stropharia aeruginosa
- Stropharia agaricoides
- Stropharia agrocyboides
- Stropharia albivelata
- Stropharia albonitens
- Stropharia albosulphurea
- Stropharia ambigua
- Stropharia araucariae
- Stropharia aurantiaca
- Stropharia caerulea
- Stropharia chrysocystidia – China
- Stropharia cifuentesii – Mexico
- Stropharia coronilla
- Stropharia farlowiana
- Stropharia formosa
- Stropharia halophila
- Stropharia hornemannii
- Stropharia inuncta
- Stropharia kauffmanii
- Stropharia lepiotiformis
- Stropharia luteonitens
- Stropharia mammillata
- Stropharia melanosperma
- Stropharia pseudocyanea
- Stropharia rubrobrunnea – Western Ghats, India
- Stropharia rugosoannulata
- Stropharia squamulosa
- Stropharia variicolor
- Stropharia venusta

== Gallery ==
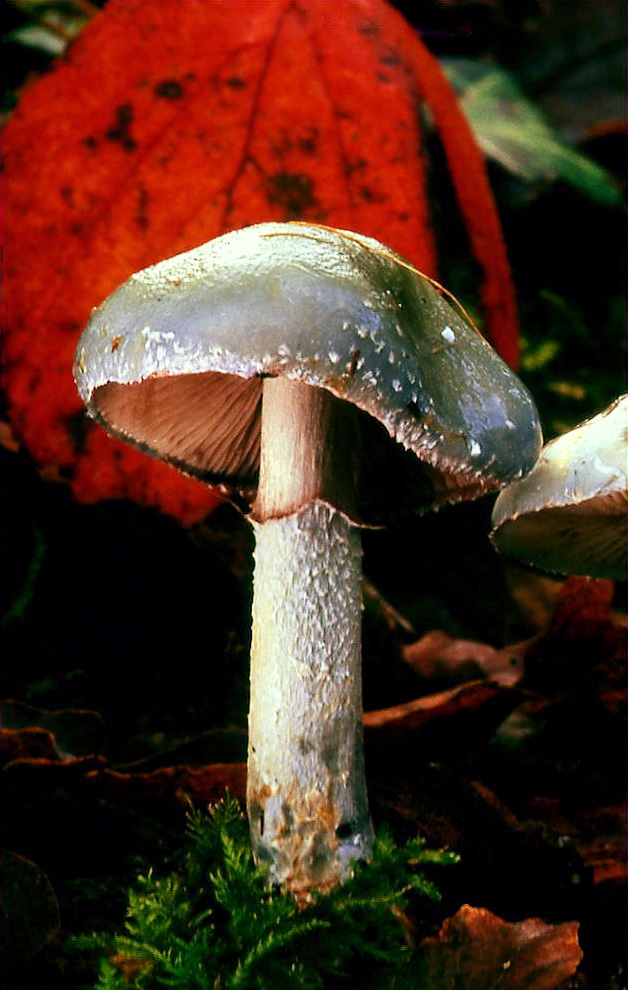
Stropharia aeruginosa

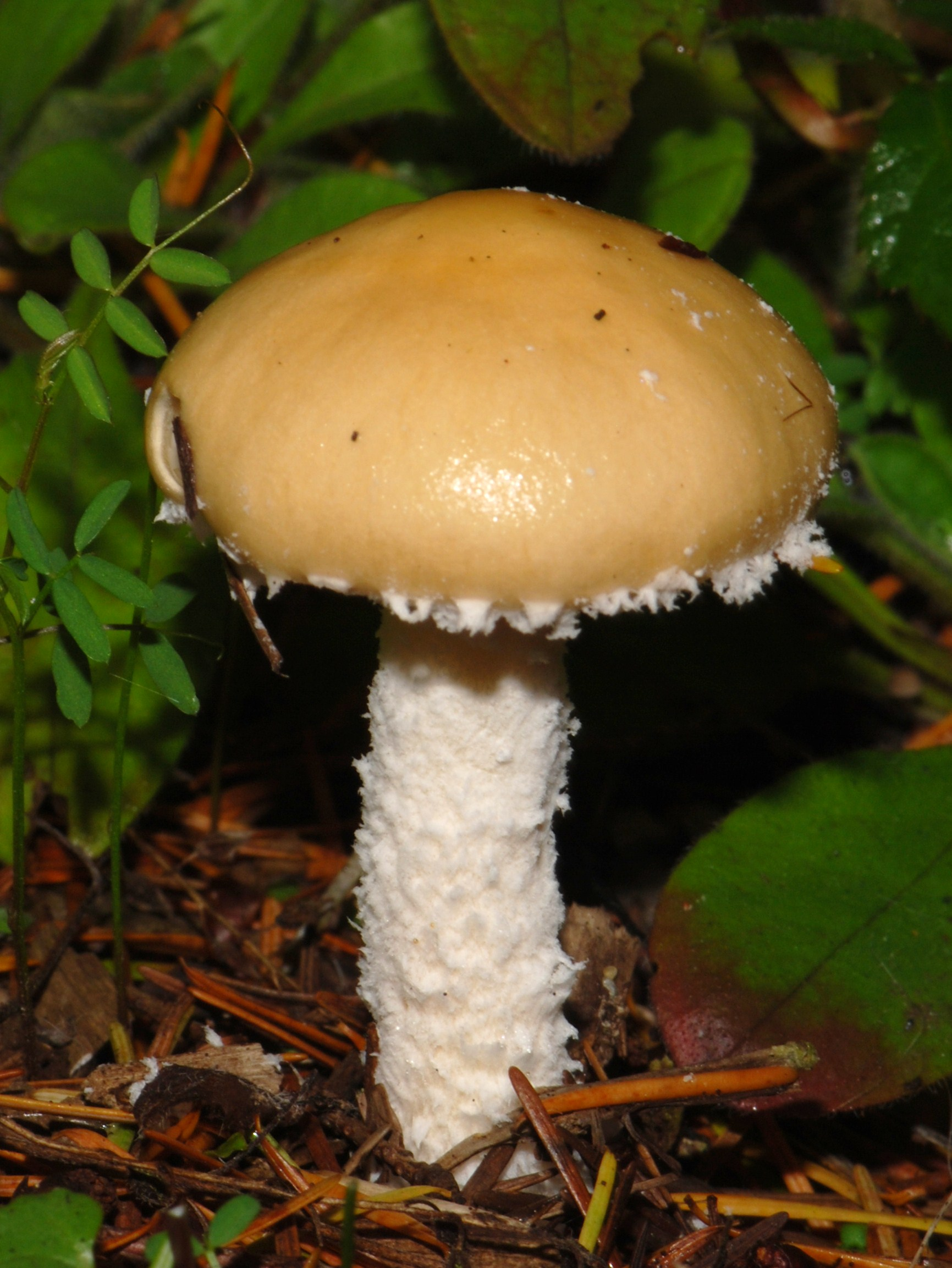
Stropharia ambigua

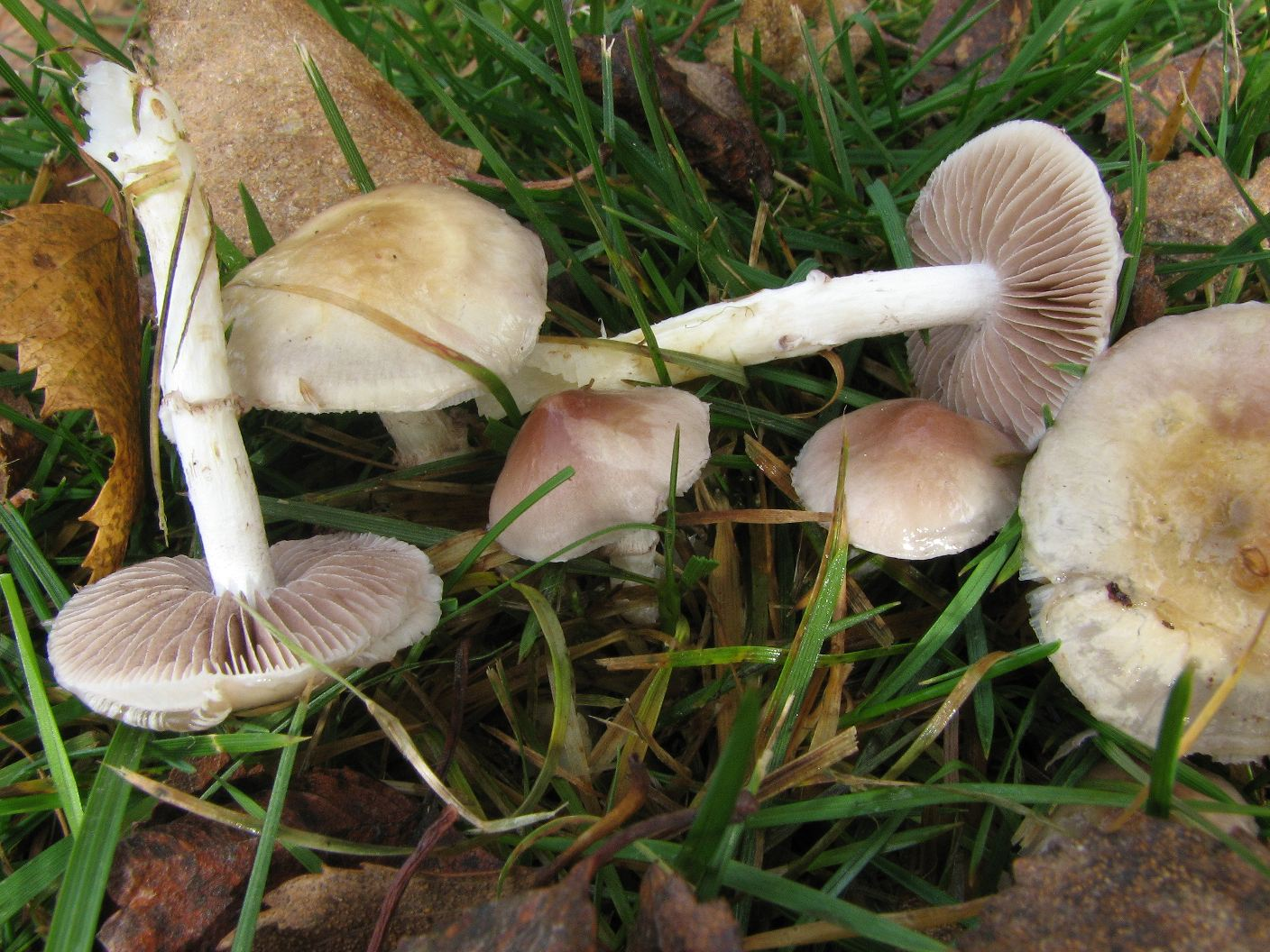
Stropharia inuncta

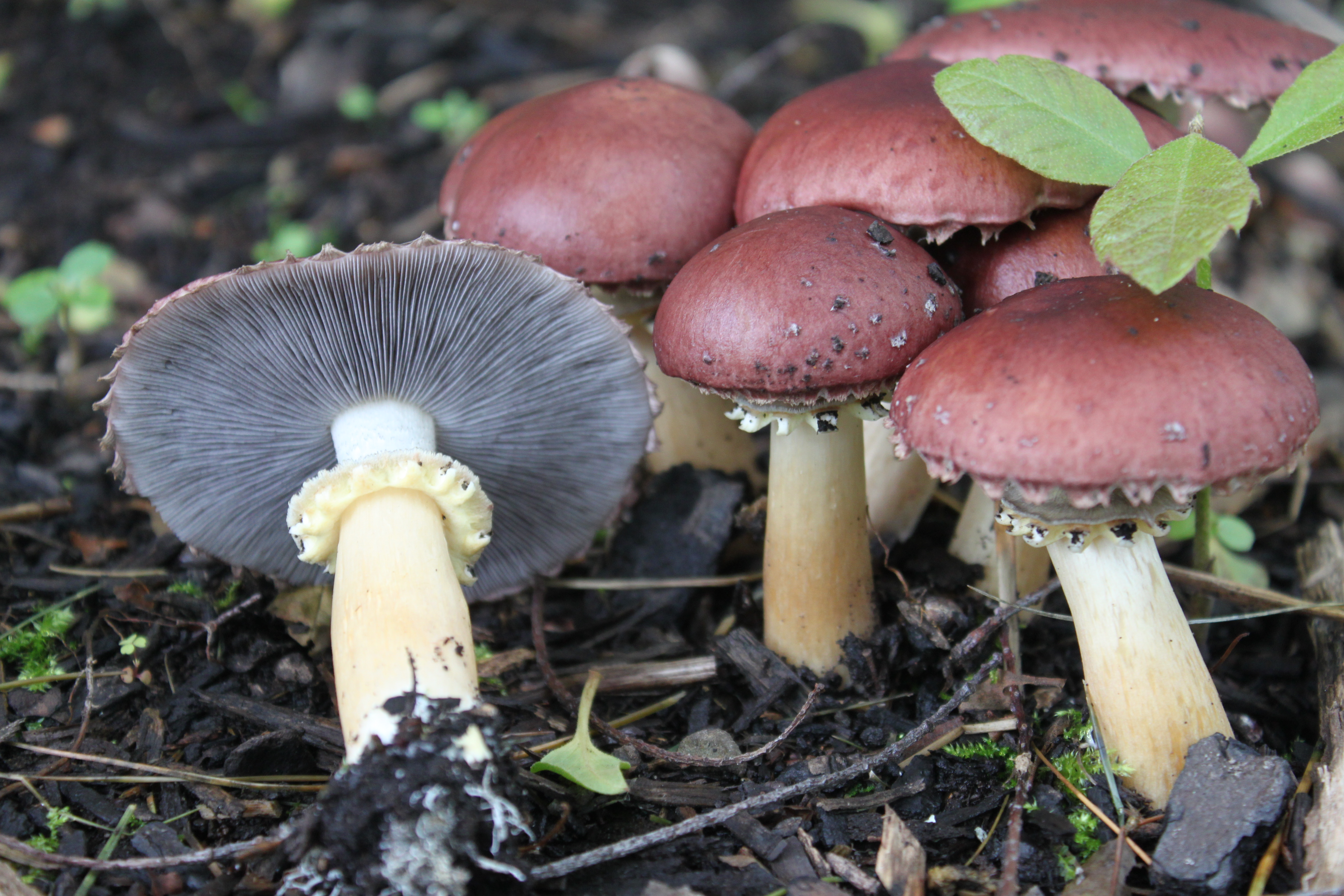
Stropharia rugosoannulata

== Legal status ==
=== United States ===
==== Louisiana ====
Except for ornamental purposes, growing, selling or possessing Stropharia spp. is prohibited by Louisiana State Act 159.
