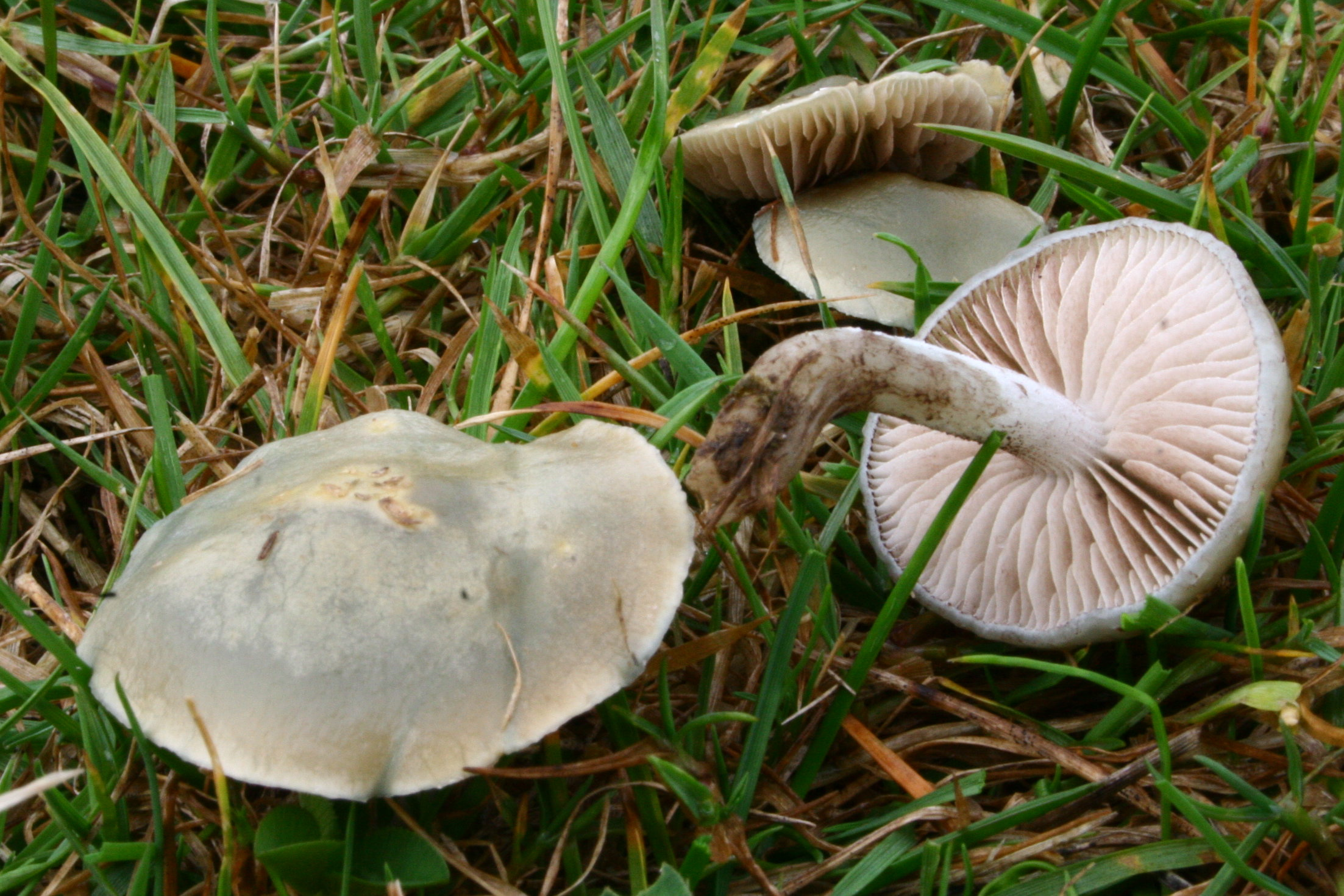

Scientific classification
- Domain: Eukaryota
- Kingdom: Fungi
- Division: Basidiomycota
- Class: Agaricomycetes
- Order: Agaricales
- Family: Strophariaceae
- Genus: Stropharia
- Species: S. pseudocyanea

Binomial name
- Stropharia pseudocyanea (Desm.) Morgan (1908)

Synonyms
- Agaricus pseudocyaneus Desm. (1823)

= Stropharia pseudocyanea =

Species of fungus

Stropharia pseudocyanea Mycological characteristics
- Gills on hymenium
- Cap is convex or conical
- Hymenium is adnate or sinuate
- Spore print is purple-brown
- Edibility is unknown

Stropharia pseudocyanea is a mushroom in the family Strophariaceae.
