= Acanthocyte (mycology) =

Stellate cells in Stropharia

In mycology, acanthocyte refers to stellate cells found on the hyphae of fungi of the genus Stropharia. According to the research paper on these cells of Stropharia rugosoannulata published in 2006, they were shown to have nematode-killing properties.
