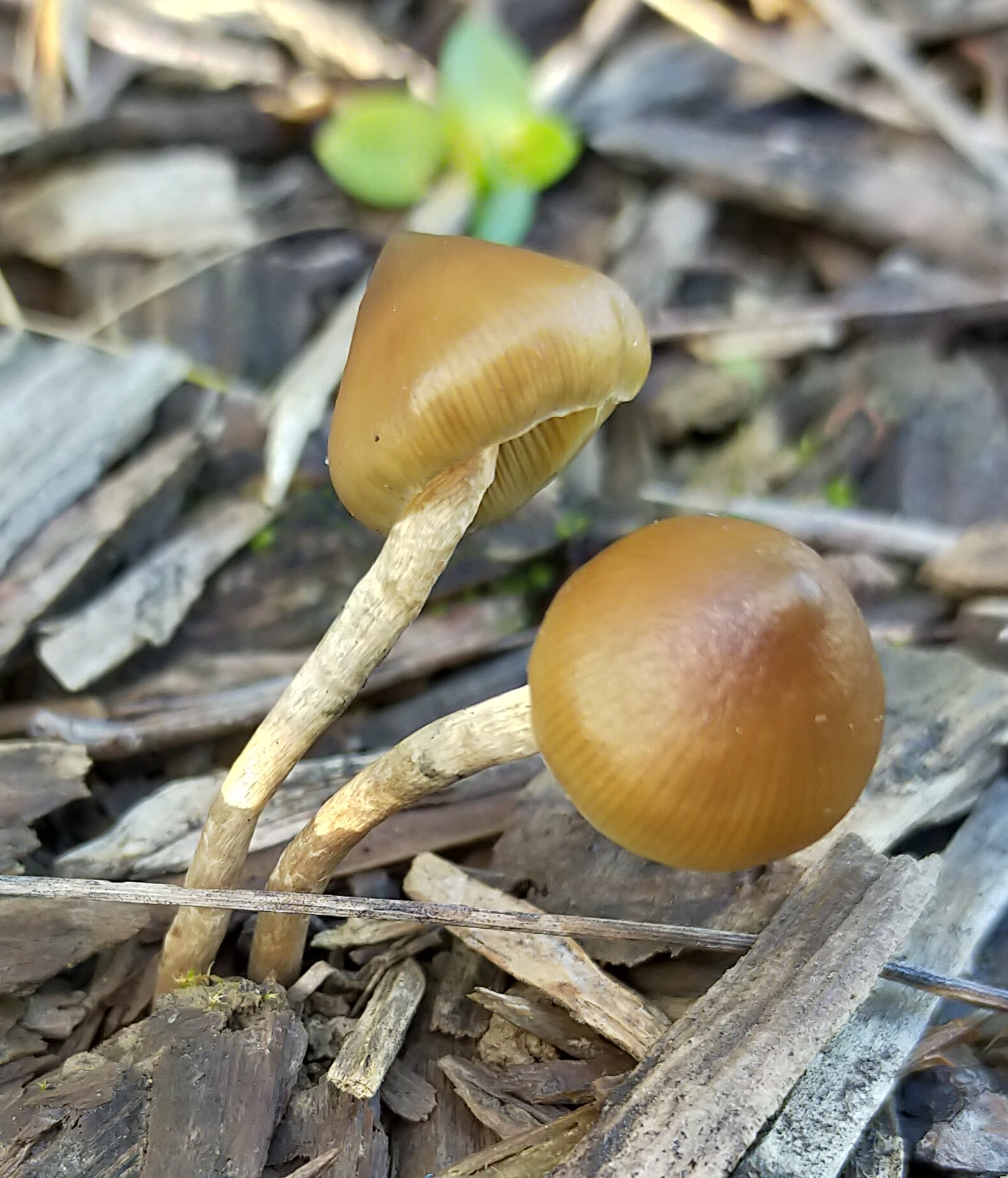
- Psilocybe angulospora in council bark in Auckland, New Zealand

Scientific classification
- Kingdom: Fungi
- Division: Basidiomycota
- Class: Agaricomycetes
- Order: Agaricales
- Family: Hymenogastraceae
- Genus: Psilocybe
- Species: P. angulospora

Binomial name
- Psilocybe angulospora Yen W.Wang & S.S.Tzean (2015)

= Psilocybe angulospora =

Species of agaric fungus

Psilocybe angulospora is a species of agaric fungus in the family Hymenogastraceae. The species was described from Taiwan in 2015 and is also present in New Zealand, where it is considered introduced. As a blueing member of the genus Psilocybe it contains the psychoactive compounds psilocin and psilocybin.

The fruitbodies have a small, extremely hygrophanous pale gold conical to bell-shaped cap, often with a prominent pointed central papilla, a slender whitish stipe, and fine narrowly spaced gills.

In Taiwan, the mushrooms grow wild amongst grasses on heavily manured soil and on cow dung. In New Zealand they are most frequently found in the potting mix of nursery plants, in potted plants in garden centres, and outdoors in gardens and council landscaping where those plants have been planted.

== Taxonomy and naming ==
Psilocybe angulospora was described from Taiwan in 2015 by Yen-Wen Wang and Shean-Shong Tzean, after reports of hallucinogenic mushroom poisonings in Taipei sparked a biodiversity survey and scientific investigation. The mushrooms responsible were said to grow on dung in native grasslands in Yangmingshang National Park. Various corprophilous fruitbodies were collected from the area and studied, leading to the discovery of the species in Taiwan, and to official publication.

=== Etymology ===
The name or species epithet refers to the slightly angular shape of the spores.

== Description ==
Psilocybe angulospora
- Mycological characteristics
- Gills on hymenium
- Cap is umbonate or campanulate
- Hymenium is adnate
- Stipe is bare
- Spore print is purple-brown
- Ecology is saprotrophic
- Edibility is psychoactive

The cap is 10–40 mm in diameter, light brown to medium grey blue, conic to subcampanulate (cone-like to bell-shaped) with an inrolled margin and often an acute central papilla. It is translucent-striate to the margin (fine radial lines are visible around the edge of the cap when moist), extremely hygrophanous, glabrous (smooth or free of ornamentation) and slightly fibrous. The flesh inside is firm and brownish orange to yellowish. The gills are pale, thin and fairly close together, narrowly adnate (the gills meet the stipe by most of their width; they are broadly attached), with one or three short intermediate gills between two intermediate gills, and have a smooth edge. The stipe is 40–70 mm x 1–2 mm, pale greyish white, cylindrical, centered, fibrous, with brownish orange to yellowish flesh. It can be hollow or otherwise stuffed with fibres. The partial veil sometimes leaves a fragile line of raised threadlike tissue around the stipe close to halfway down. This can resemble a faint, thin raised ring, often stained blue.

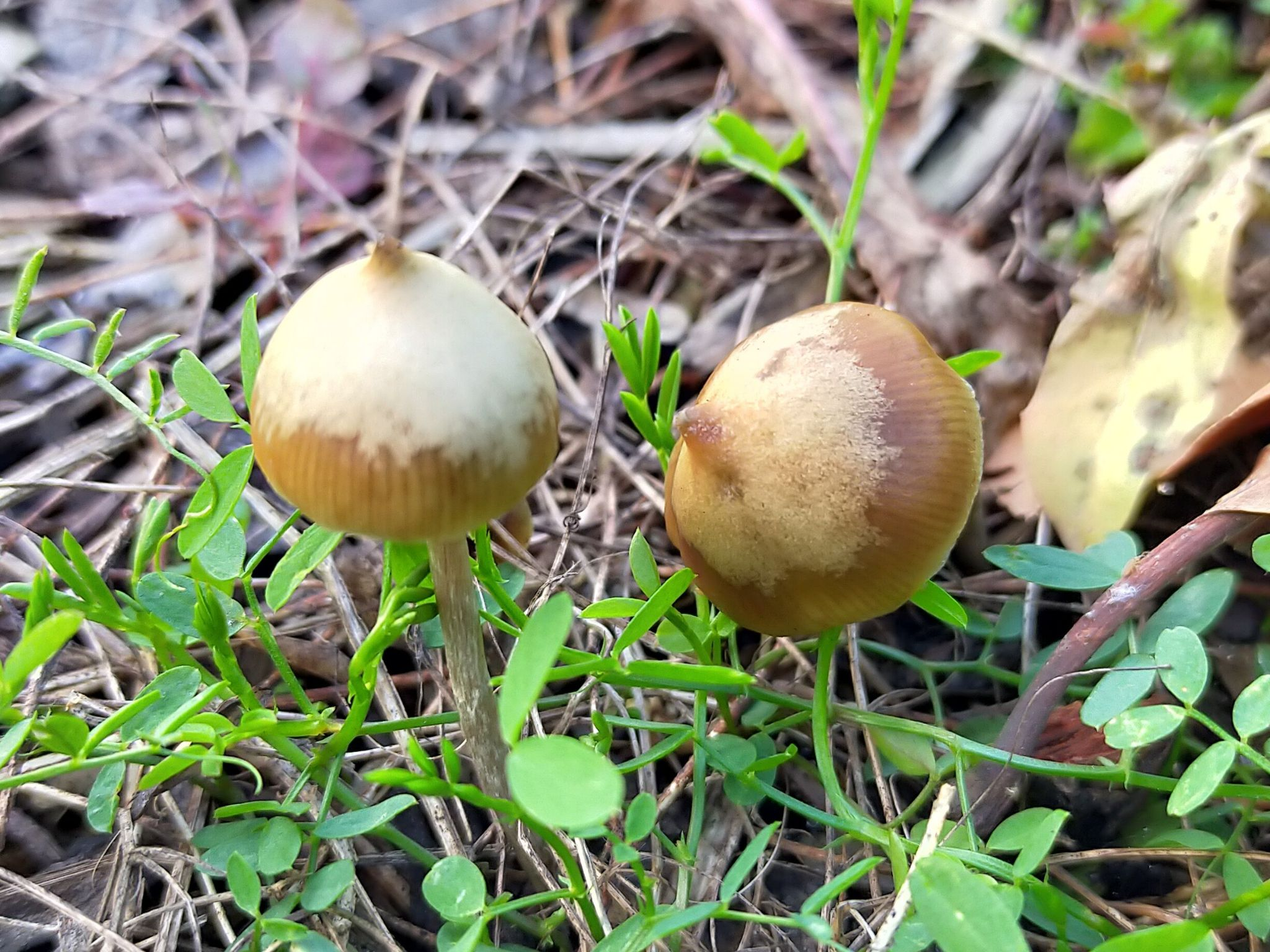
Hygrophanous bell-shaped caps with typical central points

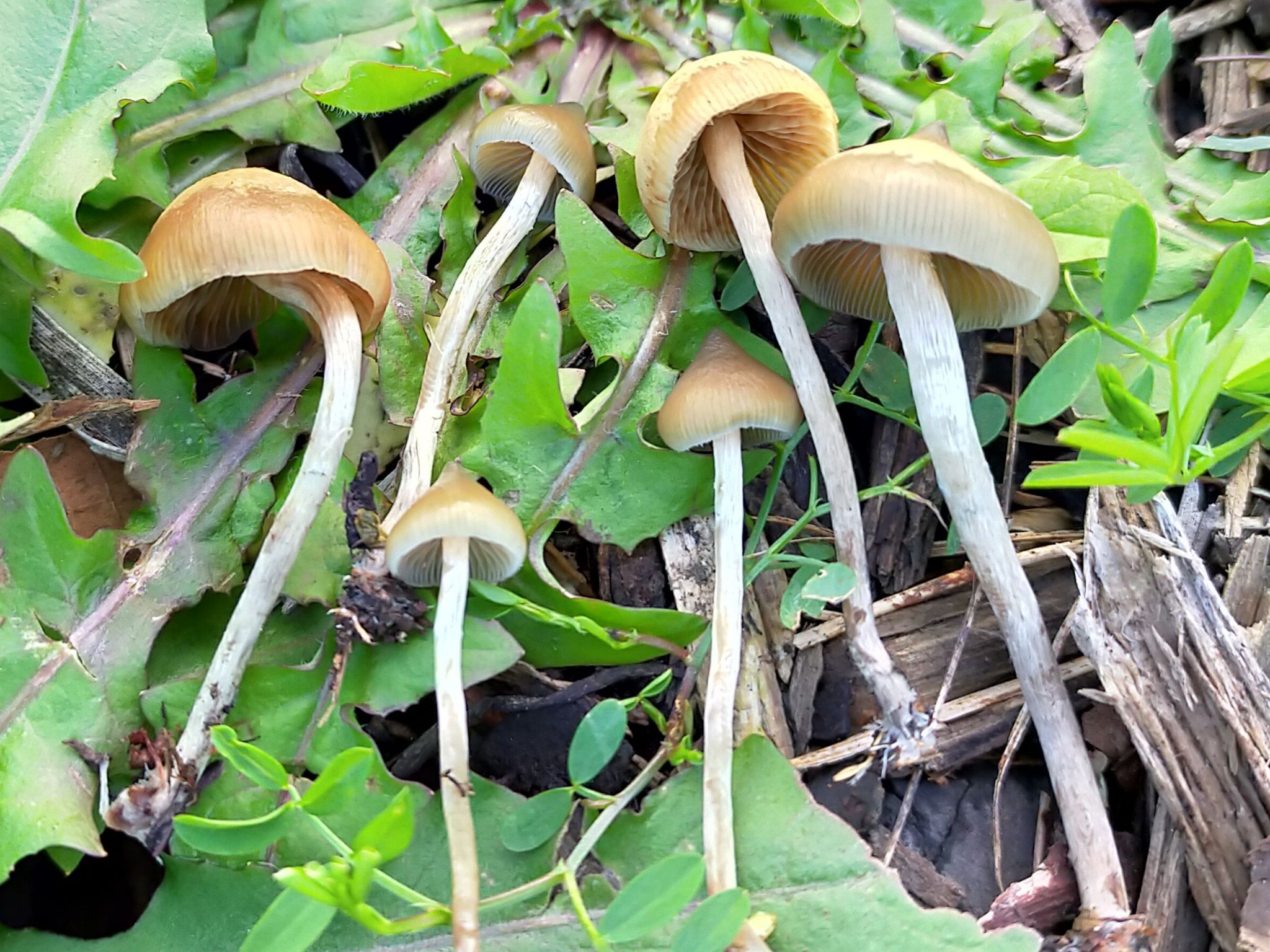
Pale gills, incurved cap margins, subtle blueing where damaged

=== Microscopic features ===
Spores measure 7.6–10.2(–11.5) × 5.8–8.1 × 4.7–7.1 μm. They are reddish grey, greyish orange to cinnamon brown in Meltzer's reagent, and appear subrhomboid in face view and ellipsoid to oval in side view. They are smooth with thick walls, and have a large eccentric germ pore which appears central in face view. This species has a very low spore production, often failing to produce a visible spore print. Basidia measure 20.9–27.2(–32.2) ×6.1–10.4 μm, are 4-spored, shaped broadly fusiform (like a spindle, rounded in the middle and tapering to the ends) to broadly clavate (shaped like a club). Pleurocystidia (the cystidia on the gill face) are absent or not well observed. Cheilocystidia (cystidia on the gill edge) measure 16.4–26.3(–29.2) μm long, (1.6–)1.8–3.0(–3.6) μm wide at the apex, (3.6–)4.5–7.1 μm wide at base. They are fusiform (spindle-shaped) to lageniform (having a large base tapering to a narrow neck; flask-shaped), sometimes bifurcate (branching), hyaline (transparent), clustered, and abundant. The hypodermium (the second layer of tissue of the cuticle) is composed of inflated threadlike hyphae, measuring 6.3–17.0 μm. The outer tissue of the stipe consists of short-segmented, inflated, threadlike parallel hyphae with thick walls, measuring 9.3–22.3 μm. Clamp connections are present.

=== Published description ===
"Dung-associated, Potentially Hallucinogenic Mushrooms from Taiwan" Yen-Wen Wang and Shean-Shong Tzean, 2015.

== Habitat and distribution ==
Scattered on heavily manured soil in grassland, and directly on cow dung, at Qingtiangang in Yangmingshan National Park in Taiwan.

In potted plants and woodchip landscaping in New Zealand.

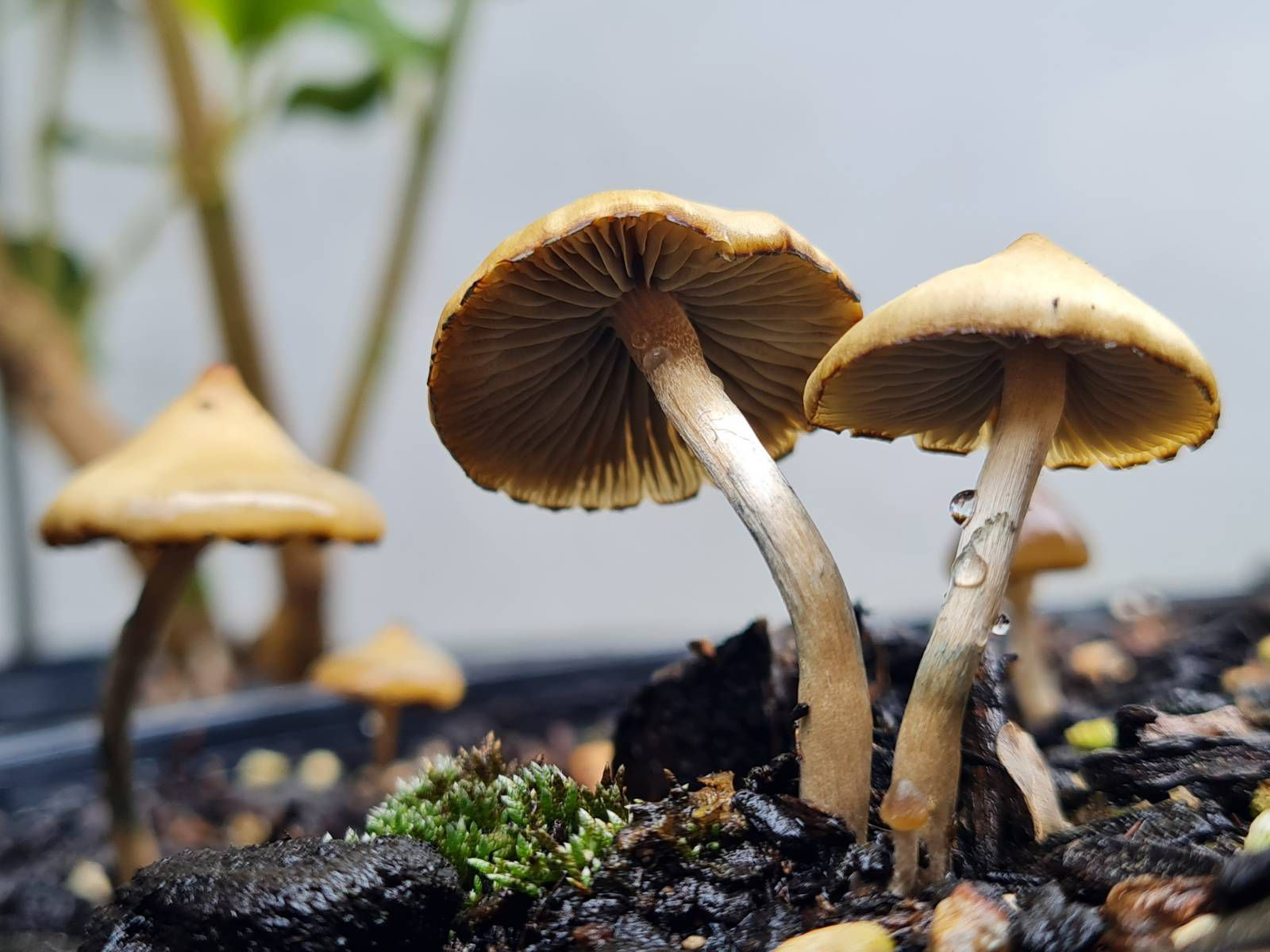
Psilocybe angulospora in a potted plant in New Zealand

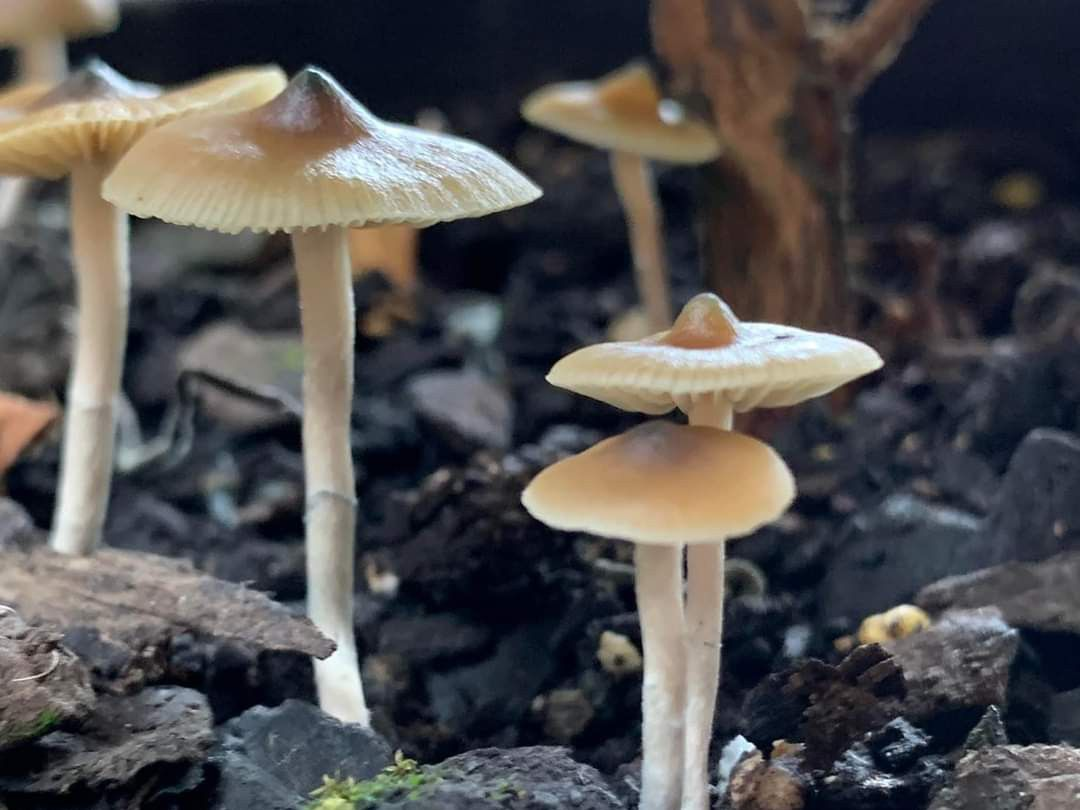
Psilocybe angulospora in potting mix

== Similar species ==
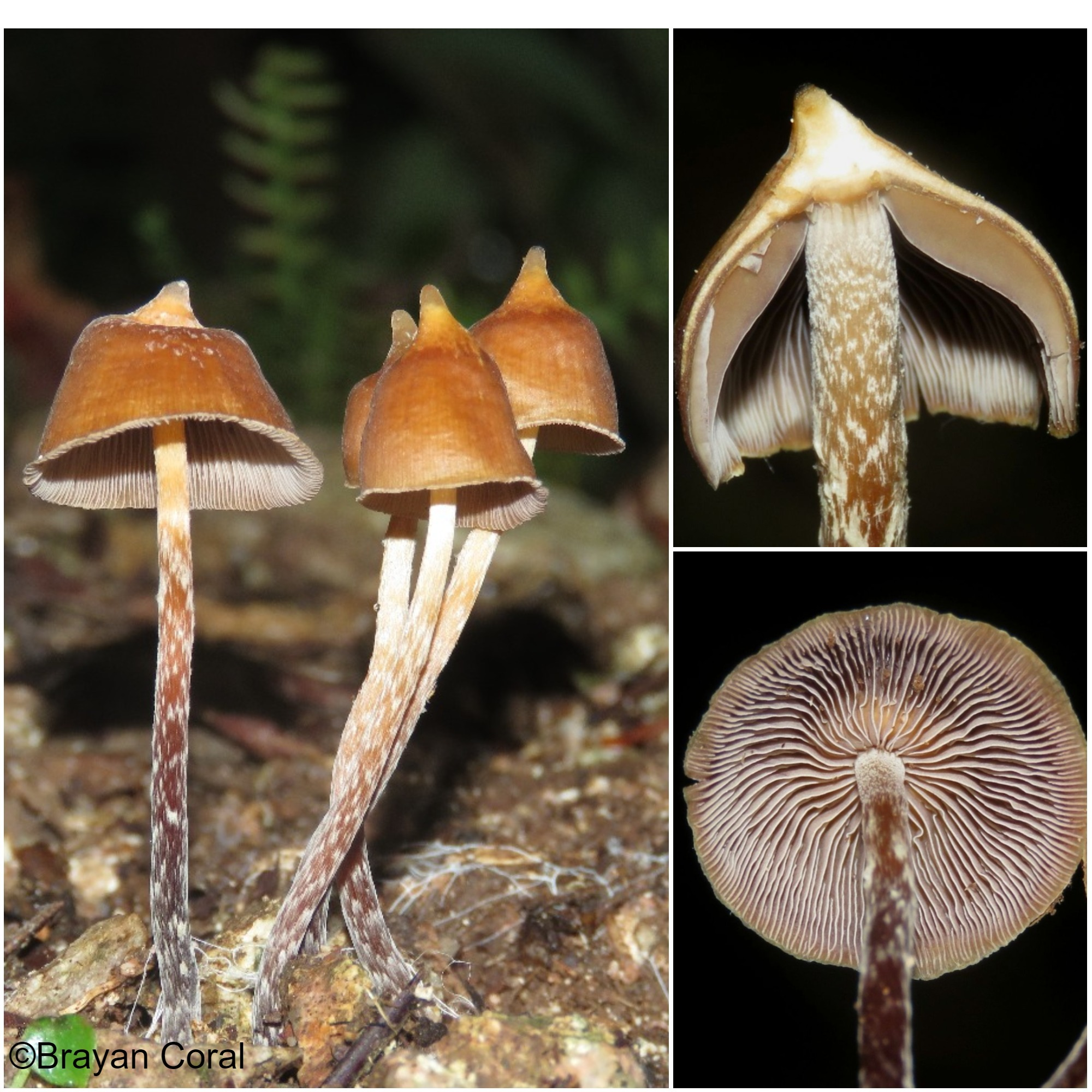
Psilocybe hoogshagenii has a comparible shape and exaggerated central papilla.

Psilocybe angulospora can appear similar to Psilocybe hoogshagenii but the two are not closely related. DNA analysis suggests a closer relationship to Psilocybe stuntzii and Psilocybe semilanceata.

In New Zealand, it can be confused with other species of Psilocybe that appear in potted plants.

== See also ==
- List of psilocybin mushrooms
- Psilocybe tasmaniana
