= Psilocybe tasmaniana =

Scientific classification
- Kingdom: Fungi
- Division: Basidiomycota
- Class: Agaricomycetes
- Order: Agaricales
- Family: Hymenogastraceae
- Genus: Psilocybe
- Species: P. tasmaniana

Binomial name
- Psilocybe tasmaniana Guzmán & Watling (1978)

Species of fungus

Psilocybe tasmaniana
- Mycological characteristics
- Gills on hymenium
- Cap is convex or campanulate
- Hymenium is adnate
- Stipe is bare
- Spore print is purple-brown
- Ecology is saprotrophic
- Edibility is psychoactive

Psilocybe tasmaniana is a species of coprophilous agaric fungus in the family Hymenogastraceae. It was described by Gastón Guzmán and Roy Watling in 1978 as a small tawny orange mushroom that grows on dung, with a slight blueing reaction to damage, known only from Tasmania and southeastern Australia. It was likened to Psilocybe subaeruginosa although characteristics, appearance, and the association with dung were not typical for that species. As a blueing member of the genus Psilocybe it contains the psychoactive compounds psilocin and psilocybin.

In 1992 an attempt was made to combine the name as a synonym of Psilocybe subaeruginosa. This was unsuccessful but the species was not well known and it gained a reputation as invalid, and with a lack of authentic records the name fell out of use.

In recent years it has been applied to a species in Australia and New Zealand which may or may not be the same species Guzmán and Watling described. There are similarities but it is not on dung, and there are departures from the described appearance and geographic range. It is reported most often from New Zealand.

The holotype is deposited at the Royal Botanic Gardens in Edinburgh but no DNA sequences are available for comparison with current records.

== Taxonomy ==
Psilocybe tasmaniana was first described in 1978 by mycologists Gastón Guzmán and Roy Watling as a dung-inhabiting species found in Tasmania and southeastern Australia.

The species was placed in the newly created section Cyanescens by Guzmán in 1983, alongside P. australiana, P. cyanescens, P. eucalypta and P. mairei. The section was to group bluing species with hyaline pleurocystidia (clear or transparent cystidia on the gill face), and thick-walled, sub-ellipsoid spores measuring up to 10 μm. Guzmán notes P. tasmaniana was tentatively considered; microscopic features of pleurocystidia and spores were close, but the cheilocystidia (cystidia on the gill edge), minor bluing reaction, association with dung, and appearance were not typical of other species in the group.

In 1992 botanist Yu Shyun Chang critically re-examined P. australiana, P. eucalypta, and P. tasmaniana, by this time reported from both Australia and New Zealand. He proposed combining them as synonyms of Psilocybe subaeruginosa, arguing that the described features and those of the specimens he examined overlapped in range, and characteristics such as habitat and elements of appearance were not enough to distinguish them. Guzmán opposed the combination, calling the comparisons confused, but it was accepted in 1995 by New Zealand mycologists Peter R. Johnston and Peter K Buchanan with the exception of P. tasmaniana which they removed from the synonymy. They did not consider the description of characteristic cheilocystidia and coprophilous habit to fit, and the single specimen examined, PDD 57404 from New Zealand, was examined again and found to be P. subaeruginosa that had been misidentified. They comment that "authentic records of Psilocybe tasmaniana are not known from New Zealand."

In 2015-2016 photos of an unidentified Psilocybe species in Australia and another from New Zealand appeared online with similar characteristics to the description. The mushrooms were not on dung but other features fit, and both were determined as P. tasmaniana, leading to the current use of the name. There are some departures from the original concept, including appearance, habitat and geographic range. The species presence in New Zealand (biostatus) is listed as uncertain and recorded in error.

=== Etymology ===
The epithet tasmaniana refers to the type locality and geographic region of Tasmania.

== Description ==
The pileus or cap is small, 10–20 mm in diameter, convex to subcampanulate (domed to somewhat bell-shaped), without umbo or papilla. The surface is glabrous apart from whitish flecks of veil remnants at the margin. It is slightly striate at the margin when moist, feels a little tacky or sticky, and is hygrophanous, changing colour abruptly from wet to dry. Coloured tawny orange, drying dull or ochraceous straw. The gills are broad, with an adnate attachment to the stem, coloured violaceous brown with the edges remaining whiter. The stipe is long and slender in proportion to the cap, 40-50 x 1–2 mm, cylindrical and equal, silky fibrillose, coloured white to almost the same colour as the cap, and slightly bluish green at the base. The veil is well developed as a white arachnoid mass, but not forming any annulus on the stem. The trama or flesh is pallid and whitish.

A moderate blueing reaction is observed in this species when handled or damaged. The spore print is purple-brown.

=== Microscopic characteristics ===
Spores are 12-13 x 7.1-7.7 μm, ellipsoid or subellipsoid to subovate in shape and dark brownish yellow. They have thick walls and a broad apical germ pore (situated at one end). The basidia are 4-spored, transparent and subcylindric, measuring 22-33 x 5.5-9.9 μm. The pleurocystidia (cystidia on the gill edge) are 19-24x6.6-8.8 μm, abundant, fusoid-ventricose in shape (tapered toward both ends but distinctly enlarged in the middle), with short necks measuring 1.6-2.8 μm. The cheilocystidia (cystidia on the gill face) are 22-23x4.4-9.9 μm, abundant, fusoid-ventricose, globose-ventricose (having the shape of a globe but swollen or distended) or sublageniform (somewhat shaped like a flask), with long necks measuring 5-11 x 1.6-3.3 μm of which some bifurcate (branch into two), others have a transparent swollen drop at the tip. The subhymenium (tissue just beneath the surface of the hymenium) is subcellular with short elements, brownish yellow appearing or encrusted on the hyphal walls. Trama (flesh) hyaline with parallel elongated hyphae 4-6 μm. Epicutis (the outermost layer of the cap cuticle) a thin, gelatinized layer of parallel elongated hyphae up to 3 μm, brownish to transparent. Hypodermium (the layer of tissue beneath the epicutis) brownish to transparent, with subglobose (almost globe-shaped) to elongated hyphae 5-10 μm wide. Clamp connections are present.

=== Published description ===
The Genus Psilocybe (1983) is not the original publication but was authored by Guzmán, and contains Watling and Guzmán's descriptions, microscopy, drawings, information on placement into sections, and descriptions for related taxa. See pages 332–41.

== Habitat and distribution ==
The fruitbodies were described growing on animal dung, some from kangaroo, or with wood and leaves intermixed with dung, in grasslands and Australian Eucalyptus forests. The growth pattern is solitary to gregarious in small groups (close together but not densely clustered).

Under its current use this species is observed growing solitary to gregarious from soil mixed with woody debris, sticks and grasses, or in potting mix and in areas of landscaping from clay soil and decomposing bark mulch.

Described from Tasmania and southeastern Australia (New South Wales in part, and the Australian Capital Territory); currently reported from New South Wales and, predominantly, New Zealand.

Watling collected the type material from the small rural farming and logging localities of Nugent and Buckland, approximately 50 kilometres northeast of the Tasmanian state capital of Hobart. Further collections came from Mount Field National Park in Tasmania, which ranges from temperate Eucalyptus rainforest to alpine moorland, and Tidbinbilla Nature Reserve, a large, steep walled valley and mountain range near Canberra, now an IUCN Category II protected area and the traditional Country of the Ngunnawal people.

== Similar species ==
Guzmán related Psilocybe tasmaniana with Psilocybe subaeruginosa, which is very occasionally seen on dung, and placed it in the section Cyanescens of Psilocybe. DNA of the current species shows similarity to P. alutacea, P. angulospora, P. baeocystis, P. semilanceata, and P. stuntzii, all species in the phylogenetic Semilanceata group.

Psilocybe alutacea is extremely similar, small and dung-associated. It was described from Tasmania and Australia in 2006. It has overlapping macroscopic and microscopic characteristics, although some differences seem to exist. Most notably the cheilocystidia of P. alutacea can be three-pronged, and pleurocystidia are reportedly rare, with long necks.

Under the current use in New Zealand, P. tasmaniana may be confused with other Psilocybe species that share the same habitats. These include a mushroom related to P. stuntzii, and P. angulospora; the three are similar in size and found in potted plants and landscaping. P. angulospora can be recognised by an often acute central papilla on the cap.

== See also ==
- List of psilocybin mushrooms
