= Leucocoprinus fuligineopunctatus =

Scientific classification
- Kingdom: Fungi
- Division: Basidiomycota
- Class: Agaricomycetes
- Order: Agaricales
- Family: Agaricaceae
- Genus: Leucocoprinus
- Species: L. fuligineopunctatus

Binomial name
- Leucocoprinus fuligineopunctatus Justo, Angelini & Bizzi (2021)

Species of fungus

Leucocoprinus fuligineopunctatus Mycological characteristics
- Gills on hymenium
- Cap is campanulate or convex
- Hymenium is free
- Stipe has a ring
- Spore print is white
- Ecology is saprotrophic
- Edibility is unknown

Leucocoprinus fuligineopunctatus is a species of mushroom producing fungus in the family Agaricaceae.

== Taxonomy ==
It was described in 2021 by the mycologists Alfredo Justo, Claudio Angelini and Alberto Bizzi, who classified it as Leucocoprinus fuligineopunctatus.

== Description ==
Leucocoprinus fuligineopunctatus is a small dapperling mushroom with thin white flesh.

Cap: 2–4 cm wide starting cylindrical to ovate before expanding to conical-campanulate and then maturing to convex or flat sometimes with a slight depression in the centre. The surface is white with a dark brown to blackish-brown velvety umbo and scattered small brown or sooty specks radiating out from the centre becoming more sparse towards the margins. These scales are more distinct on the ridges of the striations which radiate from the margins almost towards the centre of the cap. Gills: Free, white, close to subdistant. Subventricose with an entire edge that is also white. Stem: 2.5-5.5 cm tall and 2-3mm thick. It is slender and cylindrical with a slight curve towards the base, which is not significantly wider than the rest of the stem. The surface is smooth and whitish in the top half but with a yellowish colour below the ring becoming more intense towards the base, where white rhizomorphs may also be present. The membranous stem ring is small and white. Spores: Ovoid to ellipsoidal or amygdaliform, without a germ pore. Dextrinoid and metachromatic. (5.0) 5.5-7 (7.5) x 3.5-4.5 (5) μm. Smell: Indistinct.

== Etymology ==
The specific epithet fuligineopunctatus derives from the Latin fuliginosus meaning a dirty brown or sooty colour and punctatus meaning with spots. This is in reference to the brown-grey colour of the punctate scales that are scattered across the cap.

== Habitat and distribution ==
The species was discovered in the Dominican Republic where it was found growing gregariously on leaf litter in deciduous woodland close to the beach during November. It has also been found in botanical gardens.

== Similar species ==
- Leucocoprinus microlepis is very similar in appearance and likewise has a yellowish stem towards the base with similar scales on the cap, these may appear lighter but could still be confused. The cap is smaller than is smaller at 1–2 cm wide but may be confused with a small specimen of L. fuligineopunctatus. The spore size is also in a similar range and so microscopic study of the cheilocystidia or genetic sequencing may be required to confidently distinguish these species.
- Lepiota nigropunctata is distinguished by smaller mushrooms and smaller spores.
- Leucocoprinus cristatulus and Leucocoprinus revolutus are distinguished by smaller mushrooms (1 cm wide), black or grey scales and smaller spores.
- Leucocoprinus phaeopus likewise has small (1 cm wide) mushrooms but has larger spores.

However, there still exist numerous undescribed species which could appear similar.
