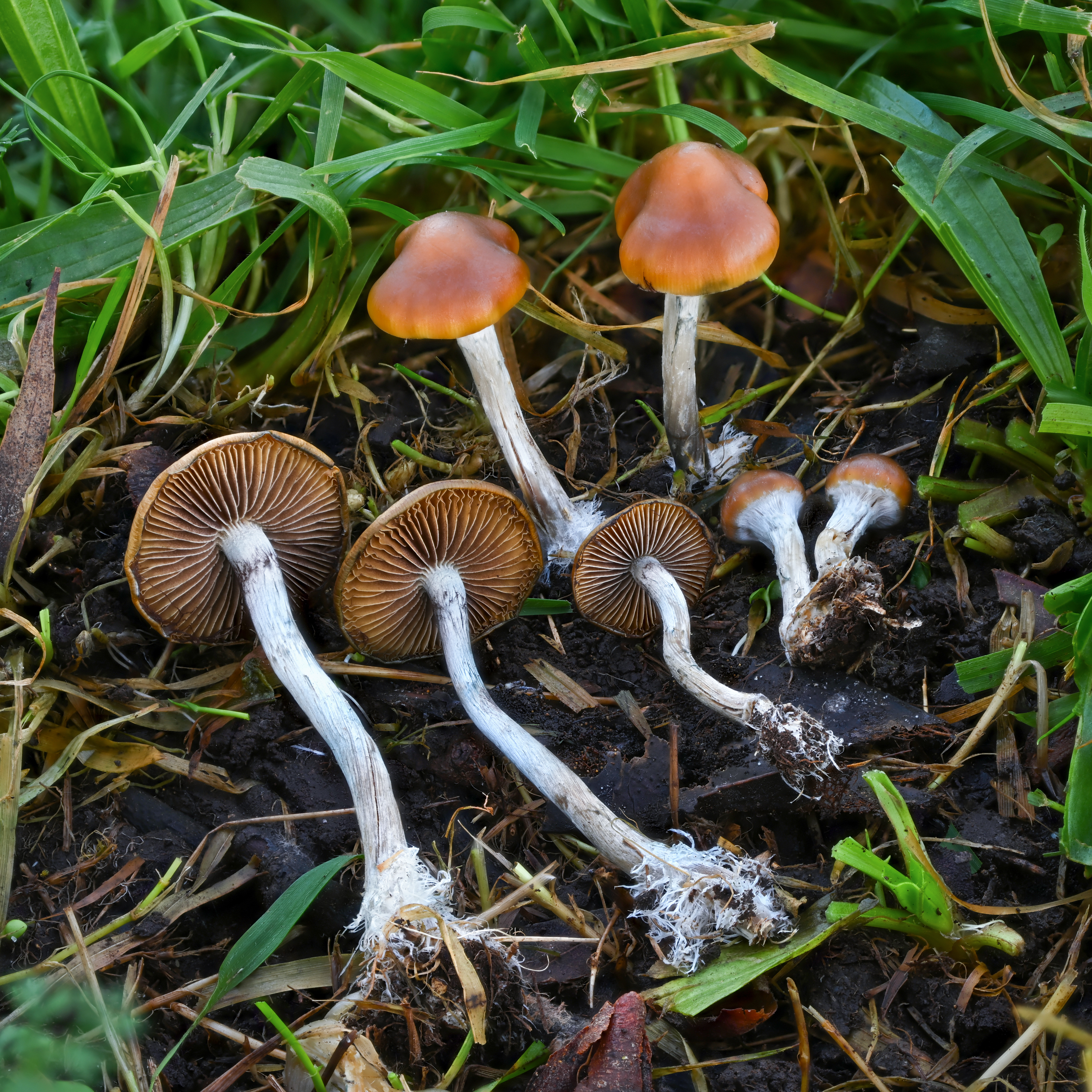

Scientific classification
- Kingdom: Fungi
- Division: Basidiomycota
- Class: Agaricomycetes
- Order: Agaricales
- Family: Hymenogastraceae
- Genus: Psilocybe
- Species: P. subaeruginosa

Binomial name
- Psilocybe subaeruginosa Cleland (1927)

Synonyms
- Psilocybe australiana Guzmán & Watling (1978); Psilocybe cyanescens sensu Segedin, Beevera, P.R. Johnst. & P.K. Buchanan (1991); Psilocybe eucalypta Guzmán & Watling (1978)

= Psilocybe subaeruginosa =

Species of agaric fungus

Psilocybe subaeruginosa
- Mycological characteristics
- Gills on hymenium
- Cap is conical or umbonate
- Hymenium is adnate or adnexed
- Stipe is bare
- Spore print is purple-brown
- Ecology is saprotrophic
- Edibility is psychoactive

Psilocybe subaeruginosa is a species of agaric fungus in the family Hymenogastraceae described in 1927 and known from Australia and New Zealand. As a blueing member of the genus Psilocybe it contains the psychoactive compounds psilocin and psilocybin. P. subaeruginosa is a saprotrophic species, which are decomposers of organic material. Its breeding practices are similar to other known Psilocybe species practices, and it shares a similar chemical makeup despite having been transplanted to a different hemisphere than its origin.

== Taxonomy ==
Psilocybe subaeruginosa was first described in 1927 by Australian mycologist John Burton Cleland. The species name refers to the colour of the blueing reaction when the fruitbodies are damaged or handled—the feminine Latin adjective aeruginosa describes copper rust, which is verdigris or blue-green.

A type collection was not formally designated by Cleland, and the collection examined later by Guzman and Watling and called the type, with distinctive brown cystidia, is missing from Cleland's collections in Adelaide, which contains roughly 400 different types of specimens. A formal lectotype from Belair National Park Australia has since been designated (AD 5603/Cleland 13256) but without details of habitat and substrate, making an authentic concept of the species difficult to verify.

A 1992 study comparing the morphology and mating compatibility of P. australiana, P. eucalypta, P. subaeruginosa and P. tasmaniana suggested the four were synonymous and proposed combining them as P. subaeruginosa. The idea was rejected by the authors of the later species, Gastón Guzmán calling the comparisons "confused" and reprinting descriptions the same year. Despite this objection the proposal was accepted in 1995, with the exception of P. tasmaniana, which was excluded for having characteristics that did not suit the synonymy, and the specimen examined as P. tasmaniana being misidentified.

== Description ==
The cap averages 12–50 mm in diameter. It is conical to conic-convex with slightly inrolled edges when young, and becomes convex, often slightly upturned, sub-gibbous, or sometimes with a small acute umbo. It is slightly tacky. There may be veil remnants at the margin when young. Coloured yellow-brown to orange-brown, paler towards the margin, which is a little striate, hygrophanous, fading in drying to pallid biscuit brown or pale orange-yellow. The cap stains greenish blue with age or handling and the flesh inside is whitish. The gills are moderately close, pale smoky brown when young, violet-brown or brownish fuscous in age, with narrow pale edges, slightly ventricose, in three series, the middle reaching halfway to the stipe, with an adnate or broadly adnexed attachment and lines sometimes running down the stipe. The stipe is 25–70 × 2–3.5(-5) mm, tall and slender, equal or slightly wider towards the cap, finely vertically lined, mealy at the top with fine fibrils below, the base somewhat swollen or becoming a mass of mycelium, hollow inside, cartilaginous, pale whitish streaked with dark greyish brown, staining greenish blue, flesh brownish. A white cortinate partial veil soon disappears, leaving traces as a raised area around the upper stipe.

Taste and odour are farinaceous and the spore print is purple brown.

The cheilocystidia are 17–29 x 5.5–11 μm, hyaline, fusoid-ventricose, subpyriform or mucronate, often with an elongated neck at the apex which is 2–4.5 μm. The pleurocystidia measure 22–47 x 6–16 μm and is shaped like the cheilocystidia and also hyaline. The spores are smooth, subellipsoid, with an apical germ pore, measuring (10) 13.2–14.3 (15.4) x 6.6–7.7 x 6–7.5 μm.

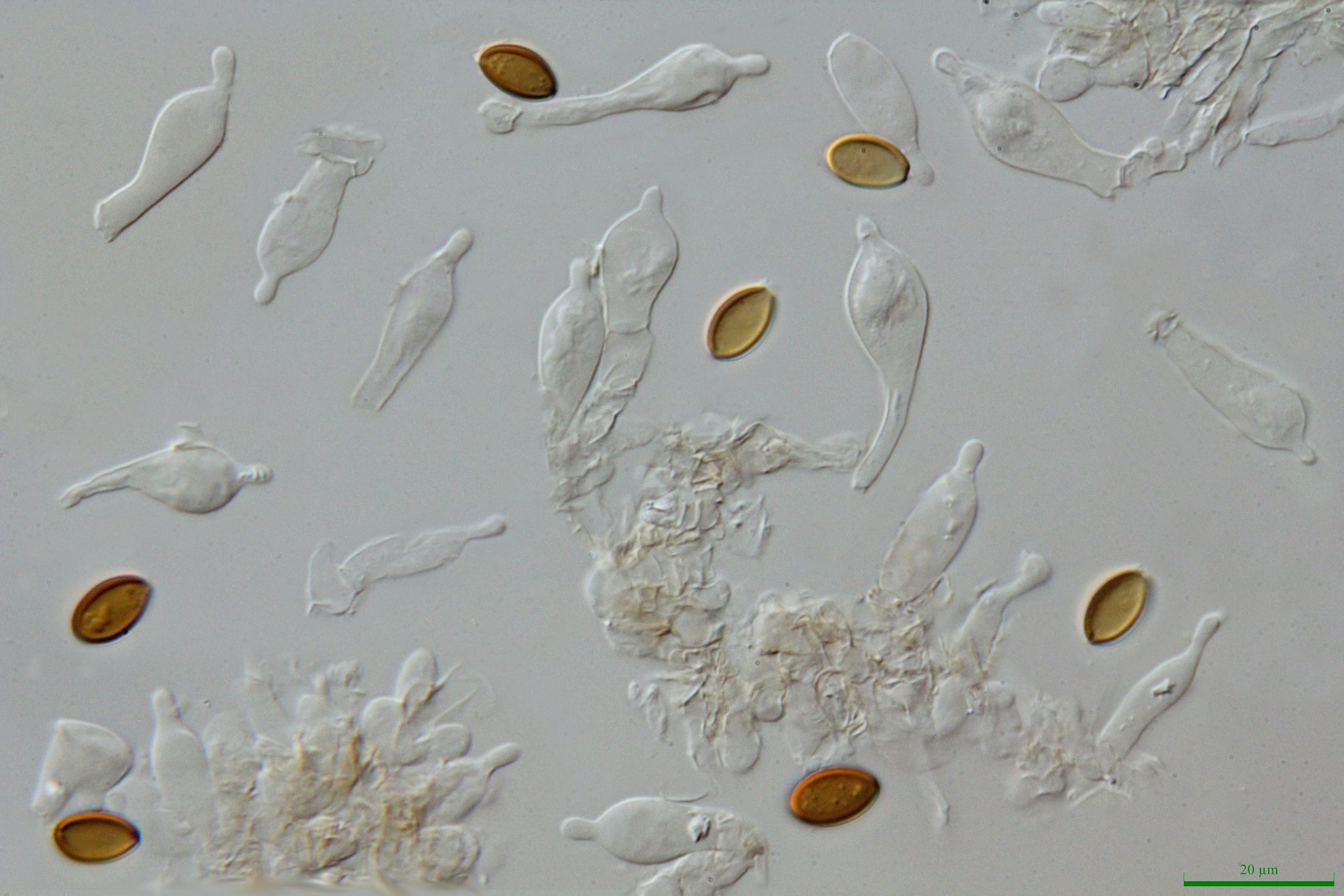
Psilocybe subaeruginosa cheilocystidia 600x

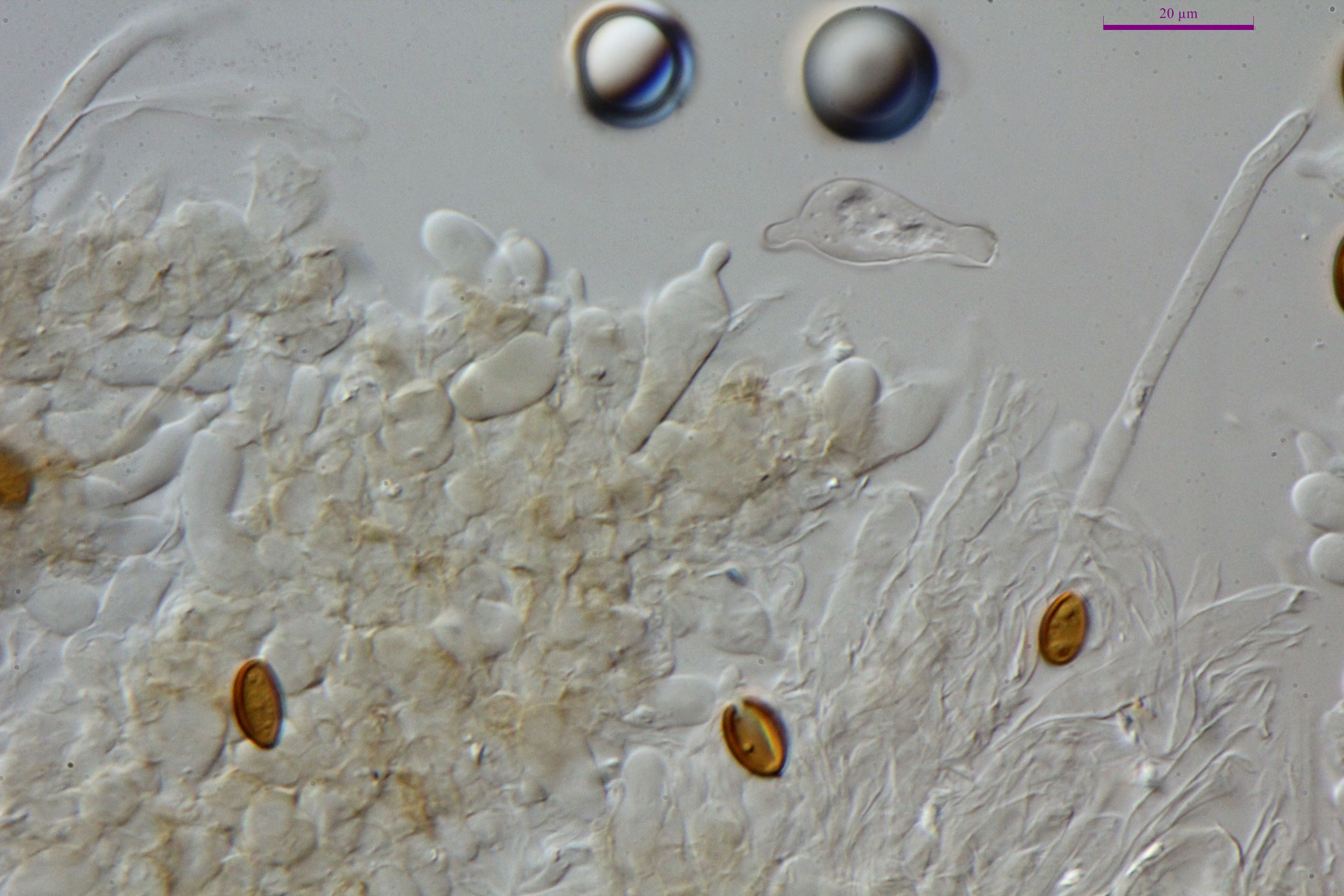
Psilocybe subaeruginosa pleurocystidia 600x

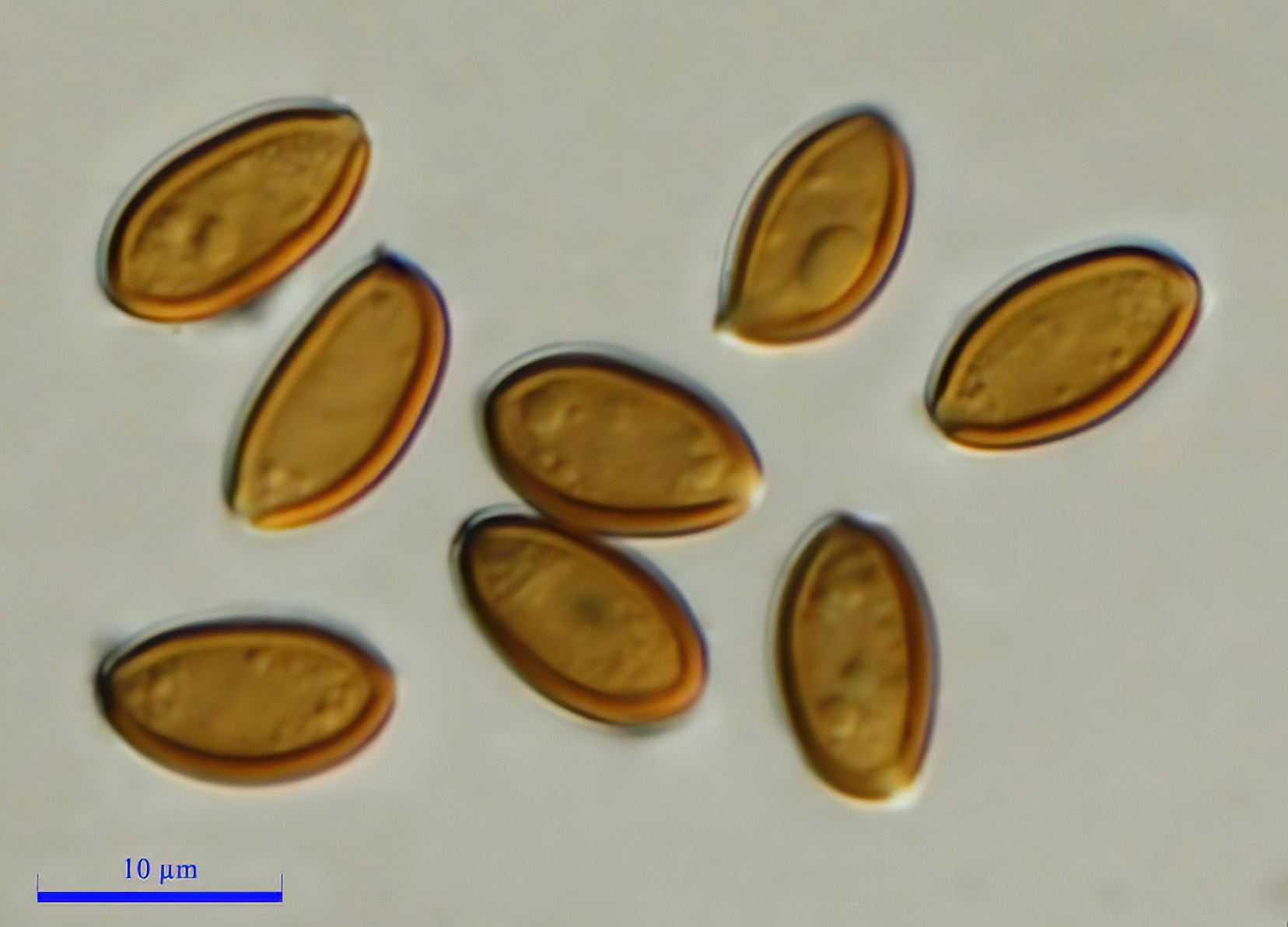
Psilocybe subaeruginosa spores 1000x

== Mating and breeding practices ==
Most studies have been done to determine mating practices in Psilocybe species that are siblings to P. subaeruginosa, but these studies have provided insight into the mating practices of all. P. subaeruginosa was found to use tetrapolar mating with two independent loci involved. While there is variation among the alleles of the sibling species, the genes that regulate the psilocybin chemical production were discovered to be mostly the same.

== Distribution and habitat ==
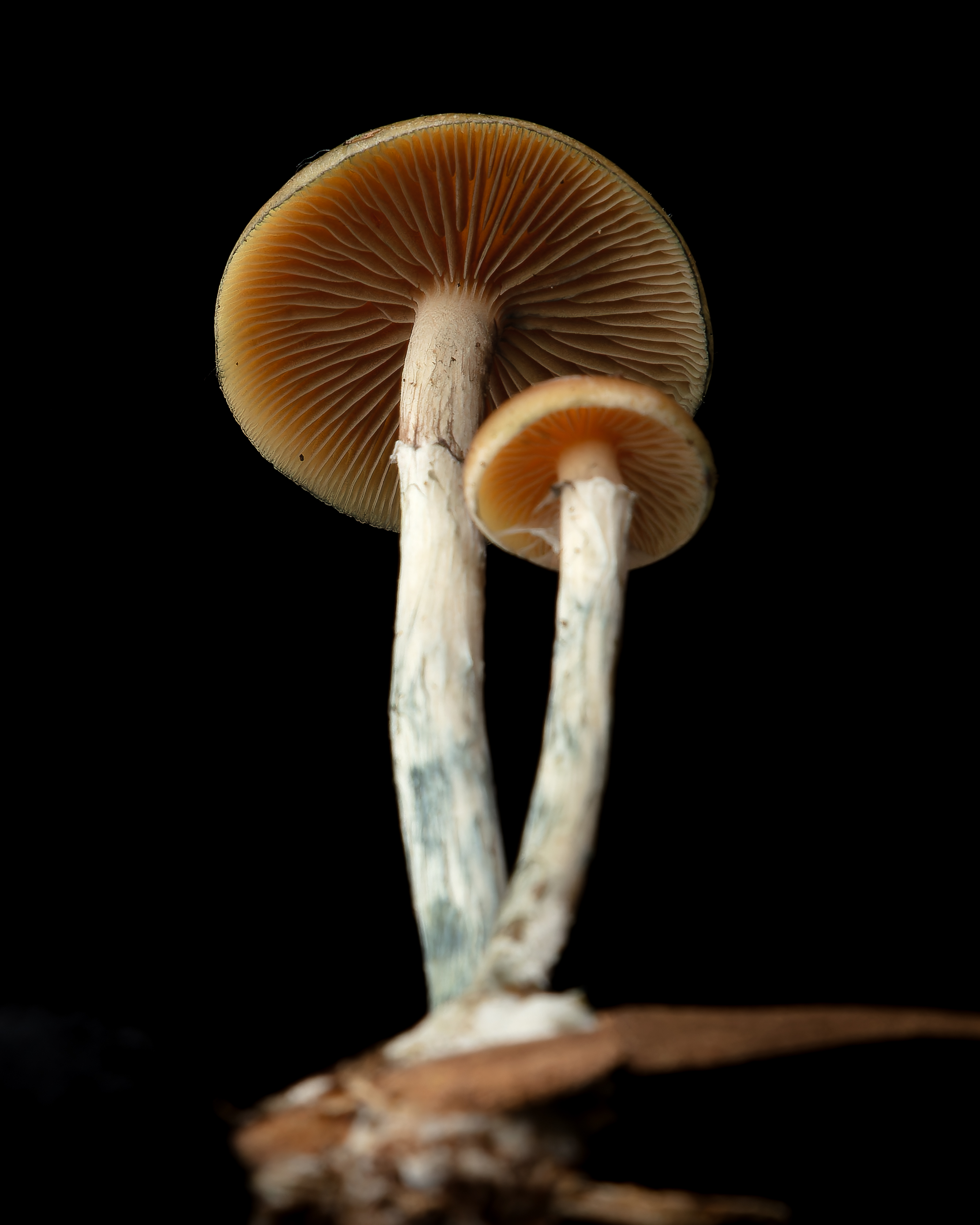
Psilocybe subaeruginosa gills, Australia NSW

Psilocybe subaeruginosa grows solitary to gregarious from wood debris in Australian native forests, pine plantations and is occasionally observed growing on dung. It is common in southern parts of Australia from April to August. The species is also known from Australian native and Eucalyptus forests, and famously in New Zealand on wood chip. It is recorded as present in New Zealand, but DNA sequencing of collections so far indicates P. allenii and P. cyanescens there as well as P. subaeruginosa. Its tendency to live on wood chips, as well as on plants and in soil, contribute to the likelihood that these were the materials it was transplanted to the Northern Hemisphere on, and the transplantation led to a decrease in genetic diversity. This concept also led to the idea that they exist in disturbed areas, rather than natural.

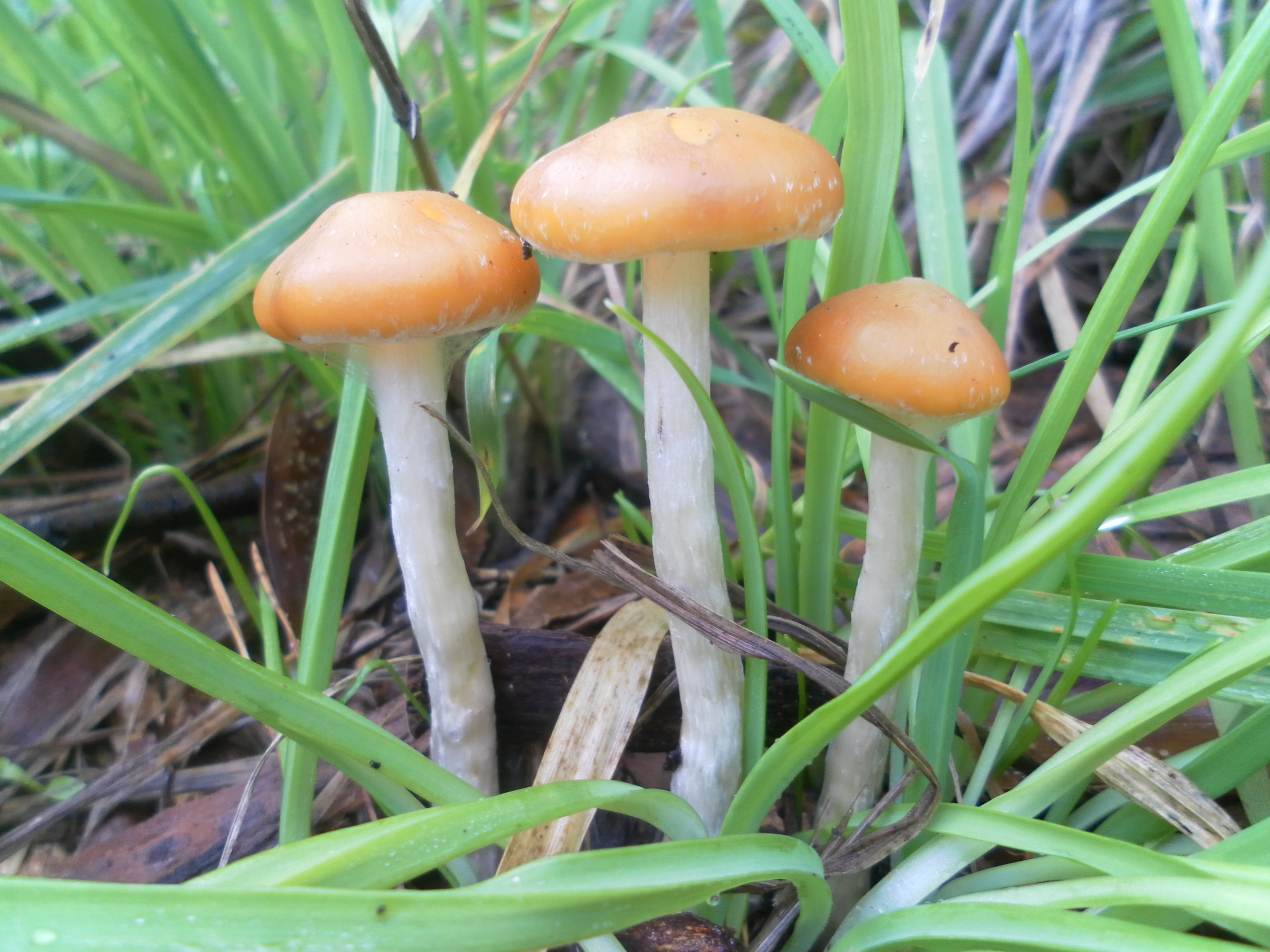
Psilocybe subaeruginosa in the Adelaide hills, Australia

== Chemical makeup ==
Psilocybin has been isolated from this species in 0.45% yield. In the same study, psilocin was not detectable with the analytical methods used (chromatographic separation and UV spectroscopy), and was estimated to be present at less than 1% of the psilocybin content.

In an unpublished report, psilocybin was isolated from this species at between 0.06% to 1.93%, with psilocin being between 0.0% to 0.17%.

P. subaeruginosa is one of a few species of Psilocybe that are known in literature but unofficially to cause "wood lovers' paralysis," which consists of symptoms like hallucination or temporary paralysis, particularly in a study from Japan.

== Similar species ==
Psilocybe subaeruginosa is enthusiastically hunted and bears similarity to a number of other common, sometimes toxic mushrooms that are often mistaken for or hoped to be Psilocybe subaeruginosa. These are not limited to blue, green and brightly coloured, or brown Cortinarius, the deadly Galerina marginata and other Galerina species, Hypholoma, Inocybe, Leratiomyces ceres on wood chip, Coprinellus sect. Micacei and Pholiota communis.

Genetically similar members of the genus Psilocybe include the Northern Hemisphere agarics P. allenii, P. azuresecens, and P. cyanescens, and from New Zealand P. makarorae, the undescribed partially secotioid wood chip species 'Psilocybe subsecotioides', and the secotioid or pouch-like P. weraroa.
