= Leucocoprinus microlepis =

Scientific classification
- Domain: Eukaryota
- Kingdom: Fungi
- Division: Basidiomycota
- Class: Agaricomycetes
- Order: Agaricales
- Family: Agaricaceae
- Genus: Leucocoprinus
- Species: L. microlepis

Binomial name
- Leucocoprinus microlepis Justo, Angelini & Bizzi (2021)

Species of fungus

Leucocoprinus microlepis Mycological characteristics
- Gills on hymenium
- Cap is flat or convex
- Hymenium is free
- Stipe has a ring
- Spore print is white
- Ecology is saprotrophic
- Edibility is unknown

Leucocoprinus microlepis is a species of mushroom producing fungus in the family Agaricaceae.

== Taxonomy ==
It was described in 2021 by the mycologists Alfredo Justo, Claudio Angelini and Alberto Bizzi who classified it as Leucocoprinus microlepis.

== Description ==
Leucocoprinus microlepis is a small dapperling mushroom with thin whitish flesh.

Cap: 1–2 cm wide with a flat to convex cap and a rounded umbo in the centre. The surface is white and velvety with scattered small brownish grey scales whilst the umbo is brown-black. The margins have pronounced striations that extend across most of the cap surface with the brown scales being more distinct on the ridges. Gills: White, spaced and sub-free. They have a bulge in the middle (ventricose) and an edge which is slightly eroded. Stem: 3–4 cm tall and 1.5-2mm thick. It is cylindrical without a distinct taper or bulbous base and the interior is hollow. The surface is smooth and white with a white powdery (pruinose) coating towards the top becoming off white to ivory towards the base and discolouring slightly yellow when touched. The membranous, ascending stem ring is small, whitish and easily broken. Spores: Without a germ pore. Dextrinoid and metachromatic. 5-7 (7.5) x 3.5-5μm. Smell: Strong, unpleasant.

== Etymology ==
The specific epithet microlepis derives from the Greek 'micro' meaning small and 'lepis' meaning flake or scale. This is in reference to the small scales on the cap.

== Habitat and distribution ==
The species was discovered in the Dominican Republic where it was found growing gregariously on leaf litter in deciduous woodland in November to December.

== Similar species ==
- Leucocoprinus fuligineopunctatus is very similar in appearance but has larger mushrooms. However they could easily be mistaken and may require microscopic or genetic sequencing to accurately distinguish.
