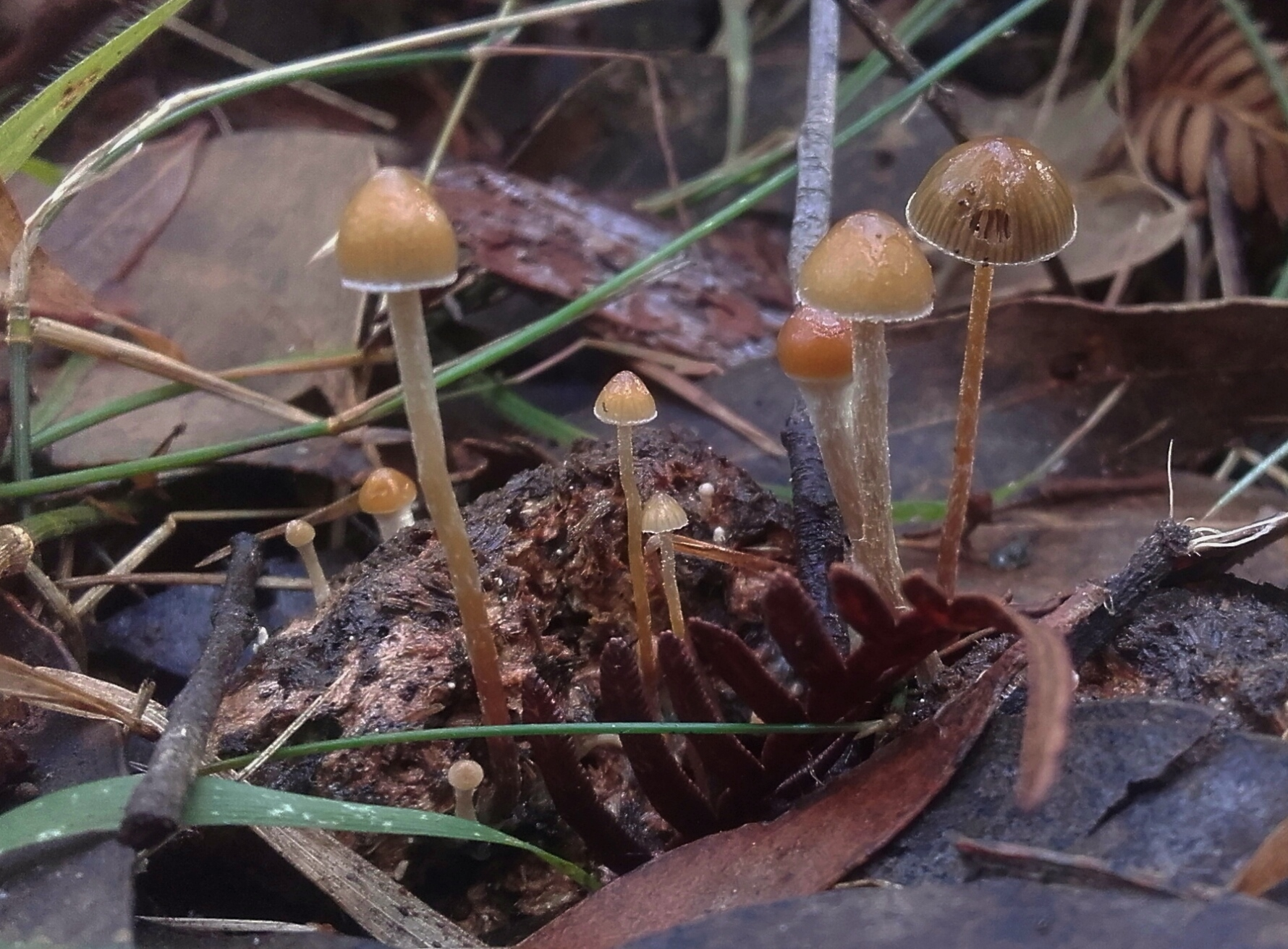

Scientific classification
- Kingdom: Fungi
- Division: Basidiomycota
- Class: Agaricomycetes
- Order: Agaricales
- Family: Hymenogastraceae
- Genus: Psilocybe
- Species: P. alutacea

Binomial name
- Psilocybe alutacea Y.S. Chang & A.K. Mills

= Psilocybe alutacea =

Species of agaric fungus

Psilocybe alutacea is a species of agaric fungus in the family Hymenogastraceae. It was described in 2006 and is known from Australia and New Zealand. It is coprophilous, growing on animal dung. The fruitbodies have a small conical or convex cap, subdistant gills with an adnate attachment, a slender brown stipe and a faint blueing reaction to damage. As a blueing member of the genus Psilocybe it contains the psychoactive compounds psilocin and psilocybin.

== Taxonomy and naming ==
Psilocybe alutacea was described by Y.S. Chang and A.K. Mills in 2006. The holotype was collected by Chang in 1990 in Tasmania and deposited at the herbarium in Hobart, with the accession number HO132672.

The species was placed in the Psilocybe section Semilanceatae according to Gúzman due to macroscopic and microscopic similarities with Psilocybe semilanceata; notably a faint blueing reaction to damage, conical cap shape, adnate gill attachment and elipsoid-oval spores.

=== Etymology ===
The alutacea epithet refers to the colour of tanned leather. It comes from high soft leather, tanned with alum.

== Description ==
Psilocybe alutacea
- Mycological characteristics
- Gills on hymenium
- Cap is conical or convex
- Hymenium is adnate
- Stipe is bare
- Spore print is purple-brown
- Ecology is saprotrophic
- Edibility is psychoactive

The cap is 10–13 mm in diameter, conical to convex in shape, somewhat sticky or tacky when moist, hygrophanous (abruptly changing colour from wet to dry), smooth, radially striate at the edge, coloured leathery brown to ochraceous brown. The gills are adnate, subdistant and greyish brown with white edges, sometimes unevenly coloured. The stipe is 25–46 mm x 1–2.5 mm, pale brown, cylindrical and stuffed. There is a blueing reaction to damage but it is faint and slow, only showing at the edges of the gills and occasionally on the stipe. The spore print is purple-brown.

=== Microscopic characteristics ===
Spores measure 11.7-15.8 (-16.7) x 7.9-9.2 μm and are ellipsoid with a distinct germ pore. Basidia are 25.8 - 34.2 x 9.2-12.1 μm, 4-spored, transparent, clavate or obovate. Cheilocystidia measure 22.5-35.9 (-44.2) x 5 - 10 μm, are transparent with long necks of 6.7-15 μm, simple, bifurcate or trifurcate (one, two or three prongs or forks). Pleurocystidia are rare, measure 17.5-30.4 x 4.6 - 10 μm and are lageniform (shaped like a bottle or flask) with long necks. Subhymenium is subcellular. Trama regular, pale brown in 5% KOH, with hyphae measuring 3.3-15 μm. Epicutis is a layer of subgelatinised, encrusted hyphae with brown pigments, 2.5-5 μm broad. Clamp connections are present.

== Distribution and habitat ==
Present in Australia and New Zealand. In Tasmania collections were made at Snug Falls Track, Mount Field National Park (Pandanus Walk) and Kermandie Falls (Upper Track).

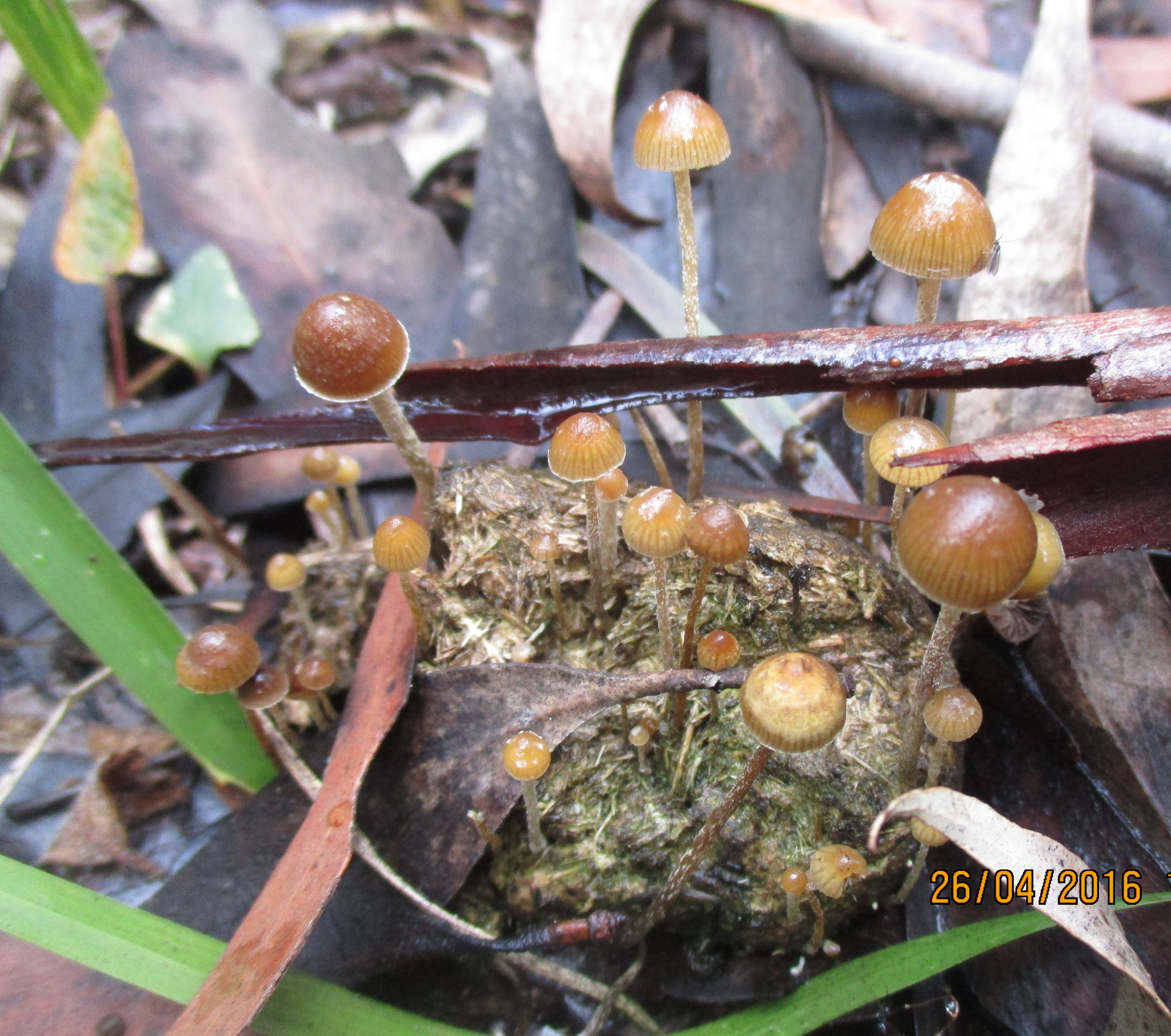
Psilocybe alutacea on dung

Found growing solitary to sub-gregarious on cow dung; also collected on horse and wombat dung. Sometimes in leaf litter or from soil in mossy areas.

== Similar species ==
Members of the Psilocybe section Semilanceatae, genetically similar species and small brown corprophilous fungi. Psilocybe semilanceata is more umbonate and grows in grasslands and paddocks from decaying grass roots, not on animal dung. Psilocybe fimetaria has a stipe that discolours yellow with handling or age, and is known from the Pacific Northwest region of the United States and Canada, Chile, Great Britain, and Europe.

Psilocybe liniformans has a convex to applanate cap, and is known from the Pacific Northwest and Chile. Psilocybe pelliculosa is closely related with a similar appearance. It occurs predominantly in the Pacific Northwest region of the United States and Canada, where it grows in litter in coniferous woods.

Psilocybe tasmaniana is similar in its original description, distribution and corprophilous habit but microscopic features differ; pleurocystidia in that species are reportedly abundant, and fusiod-ventricose, with short necks. Deconica corprophila and similar Deconica species are close lookalikes but with subdecurrent gills and no blueing reaction. Panaeolus species' spores are brown, greyish or black, not purple-brown. Protostropharia semiglobata has a slippery glutinous stipe when wet and no blueing reaction.

== See also ==
- List of psilocybin mushrooms
