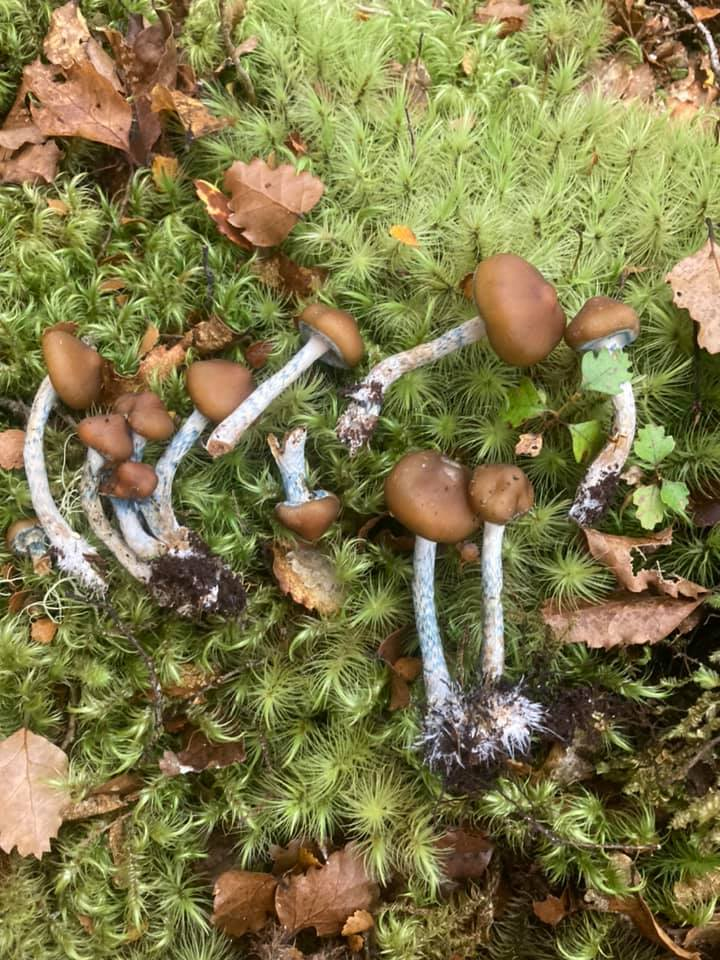

Scientific classification
- Kingdom: Fungi
- Division: Basidiomycota
- Class: Agaricomycetes
- Order: Agaricales
- Family: Hymenogastraceae
- Genus: Psilocybe
- Species: P. makarorae

Binomial name
- Psilocybe makarorae P.R.Johnst. & P.K.Buchanan (1995)

= Psilocybe makarorae =

Species of fungus

Psilocybe makarorae
- Mycological characteristics
- Gills on hymenium
- Cap is umbonate
- Hymenium is adnate or sinuate
- Stipe is bare
- Spore print is purple-brown
- Ecology is saprotrophic
- Edibility is psychoactive

Psilocybe makarorae is a species of psilocybin mushroom in the family Hymenogastraceae. Officially described as new to science in 1995, it is known only from New Zealand, where it grows on rotting wood and twigs of southern beeches. The fruit body (mushroom) has a brownish cap with lighter coloured margins, measuring up to 3.5 cm (1.4 in) wide. The cap shape is either conical, bell-shaped, but as the mushroom grows, it expands to become convex, and it features a prominent umbo. Although the whitish stipe does not form a true ring, it retains remnants of the partial veil that covers and protects the gills of young fruit bodies. P. makarorae mushrooms can be distinguished from the similar North American species Psilocybe caerulipes by microscopic characteristics such as the presence of cystidia on the gill faces (pleurocystidia), and cheilocystidia (found on the gill edges) with more elongated necks. Based on the bluing reaction to injury, P. makarorae is presumed to contain the psychedelic compounds psilocybin and psilocin.

== Taxonomy ==
The species was first mentioned in the literature in 1981, when Pierre Margot and Roy Watling described a specimen collected in 1969 by Grace Marie Taylor near the Franz Josef Glacier as an unnamed Psilocybe with affinities to the North American species Psilocybe caerulipes. It was officially described as new to science in 1995 by mycologists Peter R. Johnston and Peter K. Buchanan.

The type material was collected in 1990, near the Haast Pass crossing the Makarora River. The specific epithet makarorae refers to the type locality. P. makarorae is classified in Gastón Guzmán's section Cyanescens and is closely related to Psilocybe subaeruginosa.

== Description ==
The cap is initially conical to bell shaped, but as the mushroom grows, it expands to become convex with a prominent umbo, and attains a diameter of 15–55 mm (0.6–2.2 in). The cap surface is dry to slightly tacky. Its colour is yellow-brown to orange-brown, often paler towards the margin, which has fine striations corresponding to the gills on the underside. The flesh is white. Gills have an adnexed attachment to the stem, and are pale greyish brown. The whitish stipe is 30–60 millimetres (1.2–2.4 in) long by 2–4 mm wide. It is cylindrical, with a surface of pressed silky fibrils. The base of the stem is often brownish, with white rhizoids present. The veil of young fruit bodies is cortinate—resembling the cobweb-like partial veil found in Cortinarius species. As the mushroom grows, its remnants often remain visible on the stem, but it never forms a complete ring. Both the cap and the stem stain greenish-blue when damaged.

The spore print is dark purplish brown. Spores typically measure 7.5–9.5 by 5.5–6.5 by 4.5–5.5 μm, averaging 8.7 by 6.0 by 5.3 μm. Its shape in face view is ovate (egg-shaped) to roughly rhomboid, while viewed from the side it appears elliptical. The spore wall is brown, smooth, about 0.8–1 μm thick, and has a germ pore. The basidia (spore-bearing cells) are four-spored and somewhat club-shaped, tapering slightly to the base; they are clamped, and measure 25–31 by 7–8.5 μm.

The cheilocystidia (cystidia on the gill edge) have dimensions of 18–26 by 6–9 μm, and a shape ranging from ventricose-rostrate (broad in the middle and tapering to a beaklike neck) to mucronate (ending abruptly in a short sharp point). They are hyaline (translucent), thin-walled, and clamped, with necks that are 3–5 μm long. The pleurocystidia (cystidia on the gill face) are similar in shape to cheilocystidia, but narrower (4–8 μm wide), and usually have a shorter neck measuring 2.5–4 μm. The cap cuticle is a cutis (characterised by hyphae that run parallel to the cap surface) of long-celled, 2–3 μm diameter, gelatinised hyphae. The hypodermium (the tissue layer under the cap cuticle) is filamentous, comprising 4–6 μm diameter cells with pale brown walls. Clamps are common. The subhymenium (the tissue layer under the hymenium) is poorly developed, containing 2–4 μm diameter cells with pale brown walls. The tissue comprising the hymenophore is made of short cylindric, 3–6 μm diameter hyaline cells.

P. makarorae contains the psychedelic compounds psilocybin and psilocin. Although the potency is not known definitely, Paul Stamets suggests that, based on the degree of the bluing reaction, they are "probably moderately potent".

=== Similar species ===
Psilocybe makarorae is related to Psilocybe weraroa and Psilocybe subaeruginosa, though not as closely as they are to each other.

== Habitat and distribution ==
Psilocybe makarorae is known only from New Zealand. The reported collection locations have been on both the North and South Islands, including the Bay of Plenty, Westland District, Central Otago, and Dunedin. Like all Psilocybe species, it is saprobic, and feeds on decomposing organic matter. Fruit bodies grow scattered or in groups on the fallen, rotting wood of southern beeches (genus Nothofagus), and are often encountered near lakes and picnic grounds

== See also ==
- Legal status of psilocybin mushrooms
- List of psilocybin mushrooms
- List of Psilocybe species
