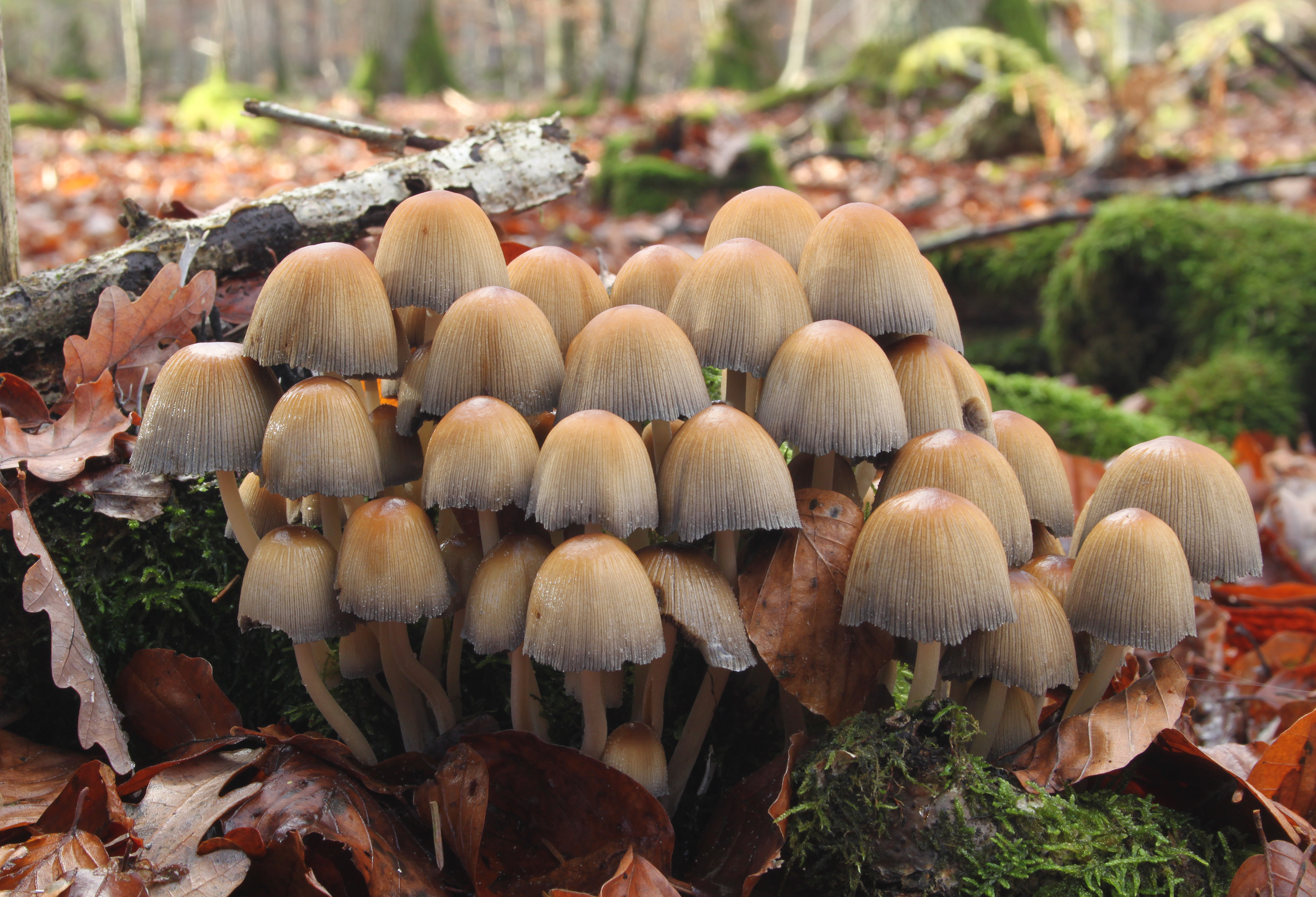
- Mushrooms near Erbach an der Donau, Germany

Scientific classification
- Kingdom: Fungi
- Division: Basidiomycota
- Class: Agaricomycetes
- Order: Agaricales
- Family: Psathyrellaceae
- Genus: Coprinellus
- Species: C. micaceus

Binomial name
- Coprinellus micaceus (Bull.:Fr.) Vilgalys, Hopple & Jacq.Johnson (2001)

Synonyms
- Agaricus micaceus Bull. (1786); Coprinus micaceus (Bull.) Fr. (1838)

= Coprinellus micaceus =

Species of edible fungus

Coprinellus micaceus
- Mycological characteristics
- Gills on hymenium
- Cap is conical or campanulate
- Hymenium is adnexed
- Stipe is bare
- Spore print is black
- Ecology is saprotrophic
- Edibility is edible

Coprinellus micaceus, commonly known as the mica cap, glistening inky cap, or shiny cap, is a common species of mushroom-forming fungus in the family Psathyrellaceae.

Formerly known as Coprinus micaceus, the species was transferred to Coprinellus in 2001 as phylogenetic analyses provided the impetus for a reorganization of the many species formerly grouped together in the genus Coprinus. Based on external appearance, C. micaceus is virtually indistinguishable from C. truncorum, and it has been suggested that many reported collections of the former may be of the latter.

Depending on their stage of development, the tawny-brown mushroom caps may range in shape from oval to bell-shaped to convex, and reach diameters up to 3 cm (1 1/4 in). The caps, marked with fine radial or linear grooves that extend nearly to the center, rest atop whitish stipes up to 10 cm (4 in) long. In young specimens, the entire cap surface is coated with a fine layer of reflective mica-like cells. Although small and with thin flesh, the mushrooms are usually bountiful, as they typically grow in dense clusters. A few hours after collection, the gills will begin to slowly dissolve into a black, inky, spore-laden liquid—an enzymatic process called autodigestion or deliquescence.

With a cosmopolitan distribution, the saprobe typically produces clusters on or near rotting hardwood tree stumps or underground tree roots. The fruit bodies are edible before the gills blacken and dissolve; cooking stops the autodigestion process. Chemical analysis of the fruit bodies has revealed the presence of antibacterial and enzyme-inhibiting compounds.

== Taxonomy ==
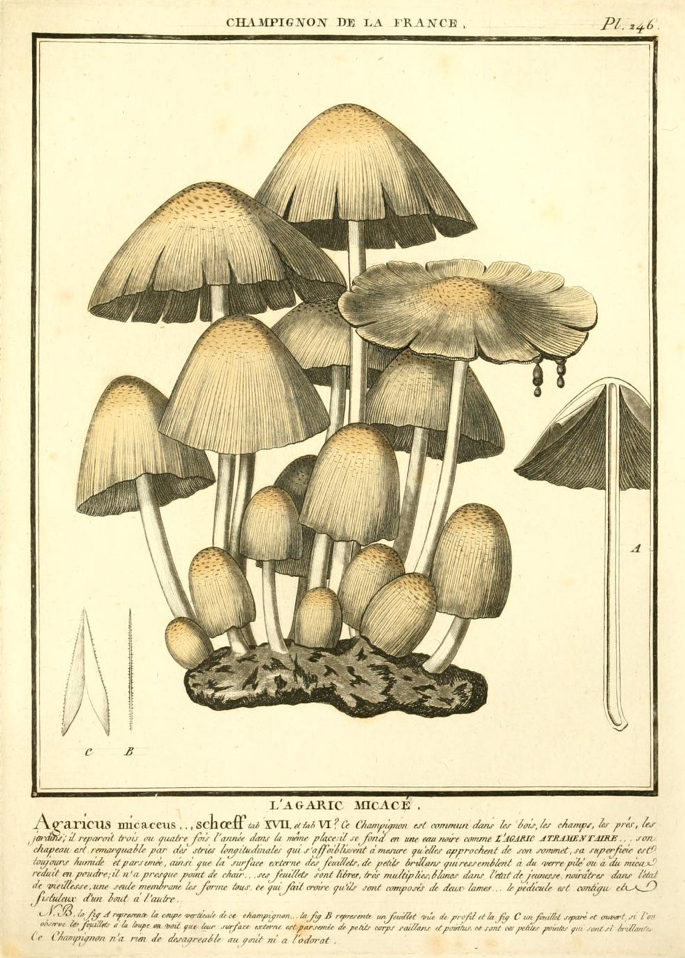
1786 illustration

Coprinellus micaceus was illustrated in a woodcut by the 16th-century botanist Carolus Clusius in what is arguably the first published monograph on fungi, the 1601 Rariorum plantarum historia (History of rare plants), in an appendix, Clusius erroneously believed the species to be poisonous, and classified it as a genus of Fungi perniciales (harmful fungi). The species was first described scientifically by French botanist Jean Baptiste François Pierre Bulliard in 1786 as Agaricus micaceus in his work Herbier de la France. In 1801, Christian Hendrik Persoon grouped together all of the gilled fungi that auto-digested (deliquesced) during spore discharge into the section Coprinus of the genus Agaricus. Elias Magnus Fries later raised Persoon's section Coprinus to genus rank in his Epicrisis Systematis Mycologici, and the species became known as Coprinus micaceus. It was the type species of subsection Exannulati in section Micacei of the genus Coprinus, a grouping of related taxa with veils made of sphaerocysts (round swollen cells usually formed in clusters) exclusively or with thin-filamentous connective hyphae intermixed. Molecular studies published in the 1990s demonstrated that many of the coprinoid (Coprinus-like) mushrooms were in fact unrelated to each other. This culminated in a 2001 revision of the genus Coprinus, which was split into four genera; C. micaeus was transferred to Coprinellus.

Due partly to their ready availability and the ease with which they may be grown in the laboratory, C. micaceus and other coprinoid mushrooms were common subjects in cytological studies of the 19th and 20th centuries. The German botanist Johann Heinrich Friedrich Link reported his observations of the structure of the hymenium (the fertile spore-bearing surface) in 1809, but misinterpreted what he had seen. Link thought that microscopic structures known today as basidia were thecae, comparable in form to the asci of the Ascomycetes, and that each theca contained four series of spores. His inaccurate drawings of the hymenium of C. micaceus were copied in subsequent mycological publications by other authors, and it was not until microscopy had advanced that mycologists were able to determine the true nature of the basidia, when nearly three decades later in 1837 Joseph-Henri Léveillé and August Corda independently published correct descriptions of the structure of the hymenium. In 1924, A. H. Reginald Buller published a comprehensive description and analysis of the processes of spore production and release in the third volume of his Researches on Fungi.

=== Etymology ===
The specific epithet micaceus is derived from the Latin word mica, for "crumb, grain of salt" and the suffix -aceus, "like, similar"; the modern application of "mica" to a very different substance comes from the influence of micare, "glitter". The mushroom is commonly known as the "shiny cap", the "mica cap" or the "glistening inky cap", all in reference to the mealy particles found on the cap that glisten like mica.

== Description ==
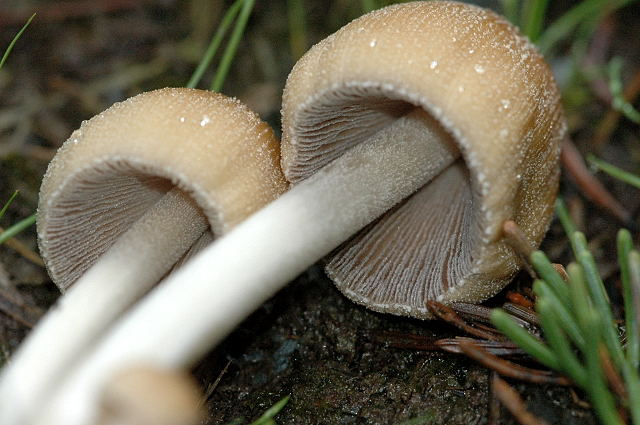
Gills of young...

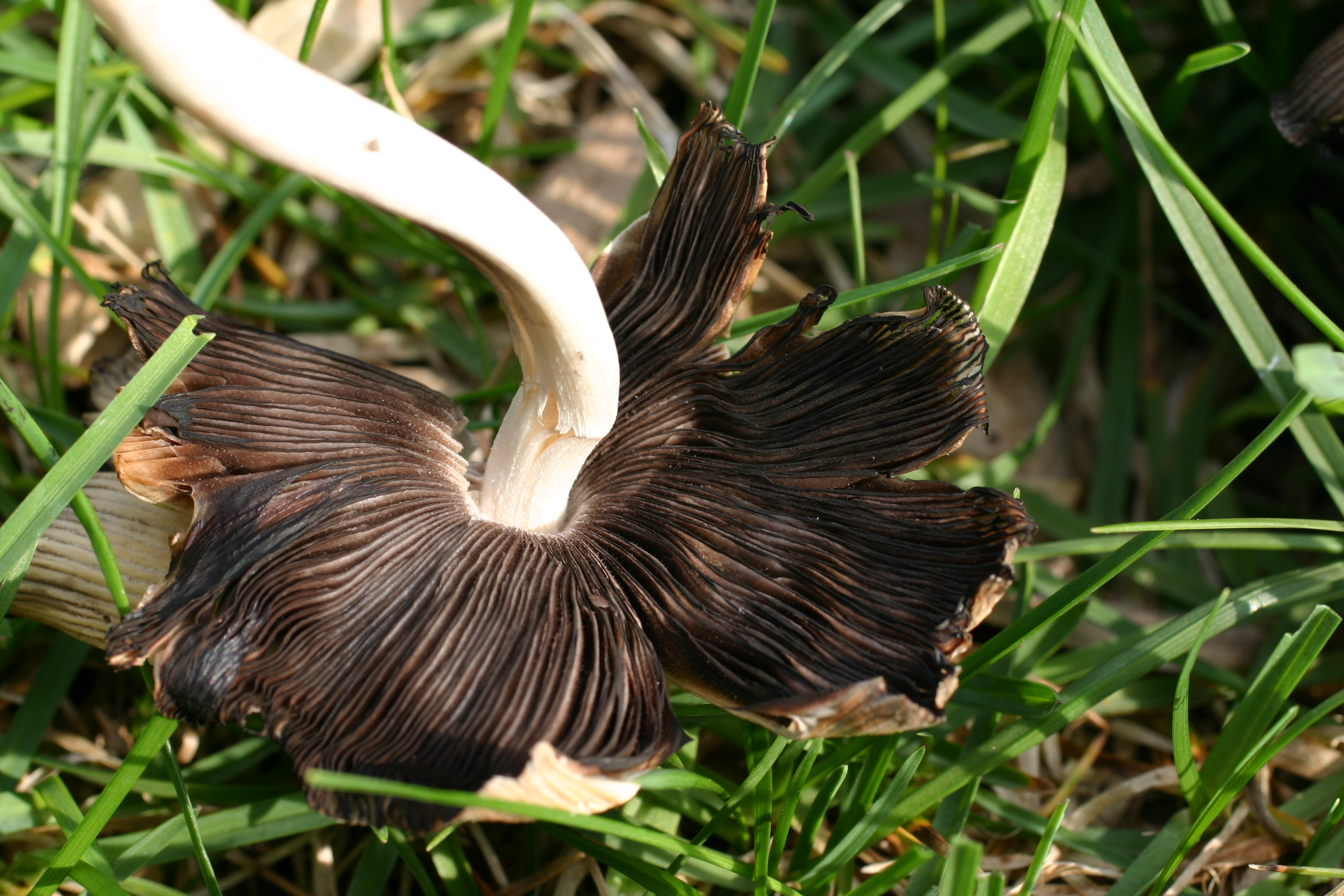
...and old fruit bodies

The cap is initially 1–2.5 cm (1/2–1 in) in diameter, oval to cylindrical, but expands to become campanulate (bell-shaped), sometimes with an umbo (a central nipple-like protrusion); finally it flattens somewhat, becoming convex. When expanded, the cap diameter reaches 0.8–5 cm (1/4–2 in) with the margin torn into rays and turned upwards slightly. The color is yellow-brown or tan often with a darker center, then pale yellow or buff from the margin inwards. The cap margin is prominently grooved almost all the way to the center; the grooves mark the positions of the longer gills on the underside of the cap. When young, the cap surface is covered with white or whitish shiny particles, remnants of the universal veil that covers immature specimens. The particles are loosely attached and easily washed away, so that older specimens are often smooth. Coprinellus micaceus is hygrophanous, meaning it assumes different colors depending on its state of hydration.

The gills are crowded together closely, and have an adnexed (narrow) attachment to the stipe. Initially white, they change color to dark brown then eventually black as the spores mature. Expansion of the cap causes the gills to split open down their median planes, tearing the cap margin into rays. The process of spore discharge and autodigestion begin at the bottom of the gills before the upper parts of the gills have become completely blackened. The brittle stipe is hollow, and measures 3–10 cm (1 1/4–4 in) long by 2–5 mm (1/16–3/16 in) thick and is roughly the same diameter throughout the length of the stipe. It is generally white but may discolor to pale dirty cream from the base up. The stipe surface is at first velvety with a very fine whitish powder, but this eventually wears off, leaving it more or less smooth. Stipes may have a rudimentary ring at the base, another universal veil remnant. The spore print is dark brown or black. The flesh is thin, fragile, white in the stipe, and brownish in the cap. Its odor and taste are not distinctive. Individual fruit bodies take an average of five to seven days to fully mature.

=== Microscopic characteristics ===
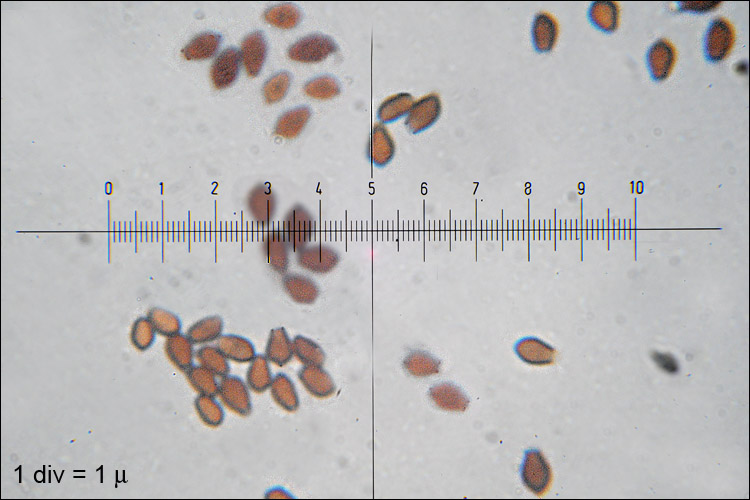
Spores are mitriform (shield-shaped).

The spores of C. micaceus are reddish-brown or black, with dimensions of 7–10 by 4.5–6 μm. Generally, they are lentiform (shaped like a biconvex lens), but viewed from the side they appear more almond-shaped or spindle-shaped, while in front view they appear oval or mitriform (roughly the shape of a miter—a peaked cap). Spores have a germ pore, a flattened area in the center of the spore surface through which a germ tube may emerge. The spore-bearing cells (the basidia) are four-spored, club-shaped, and measure 10–15 by 4–7 μm. Studies have shown that the basidia develop in four discrete generations. The first generation basidia are the most protuberant and extend out the greatest distance from the surface of the hymenium. Subsequent generations of basidia have shorter and less protuberant bodies. When a living gill is viewed with a microscope, the four sets of basidia can be seen distinctly. Arthur Buller coined the term inaequihymeniiferous to describe this mode of hymenial development. The purpose of the staggered basidia sizes is to facilitate the release of spores from the hymenium. There are four zones of spore discharge that correspond to the four sets of basidia, and basidia that have released all of their spores quickly begin to autodigest. The staggered setup minimizes the chance of spores colliding with neighboring basidia during release.

Cystidia that are located along the edge of the cap (called cheilocystidia) are spherical, and 30–120 by 20–74 μm. The facial cystidia (called pleurocystidia) are club-shaped or elongated ellipses, up to 130–155 μm in length. The pleurocystidia protrude from the face of the gill and act as guards, preventing adjacent gills from touching each other, and also ensuring that the basidia and spores have sufficient room for development. C. micaceus may also have scattered caulocystidia (cystidia on the stipe) that are 60–100 by 5–10 μm, but their presence is variable and cannot reliably be used for identification. Both De Bary and Buller, in their investigations into the structure of the cystidia, concluded that there is a central mass of cytoplasm formed where numerous thin plates of cytoplasm meet at the center of the cell. De Bary believed that the plates were filamentous branching processes, but Buller thought that they were formed in a process similar to the walls of foam bubbles and that the central mass was able to slowly change form and position by altering the relative volumes of the vacuoles enclosed by the numerous thin cytoplasmic walls. In older cells, the cytoplasm may be limited to the periphery of the cell, with one huge vacuole occupying the cell center.

The globular cells that make up the mica-resembling scales on the cap are colorless, smooth-walled, and range in size from about 25–65 μm, although most are between 40 and 50 μm. Buller explained the "glitter" of these cells as follows: "The sparkling of the meal-cells, as well as of the cystidia on the edges and faces of the gills, is simply due to light which strikes them from without and is refracted and reflected to the eye in the same manner as from the minute drops of water one so often sees at the tips of grass leaves on English lawns early in the morning after a dewy night."

In 1914, Michael Levine was the first to report successfully cultivating C. micaceus from spores in the laboratory. In his experiments, fruit bodies appeared roughly 40 to 60 days after initially inoculating the growth media (agar supplemented with soil, horse dung, or cornmeal) with spores. Like other coprinoid species, C. micaceus undergoes synchronous meiosis. The chromosomes are readily discernible with light microscopy, and all of the meiotic stages are well-defined. These features have made the species a useful tool in laboratory investigations of basidiomycete cytogenetics. The chromosome number of C. micaceus is n=12.

The microscopic characteristics and cytogenetics of C. micaceus are well known, and it has been used frequently as a model organism to study cell division and meiosis in basidiomycetes.

=== Similar species ===
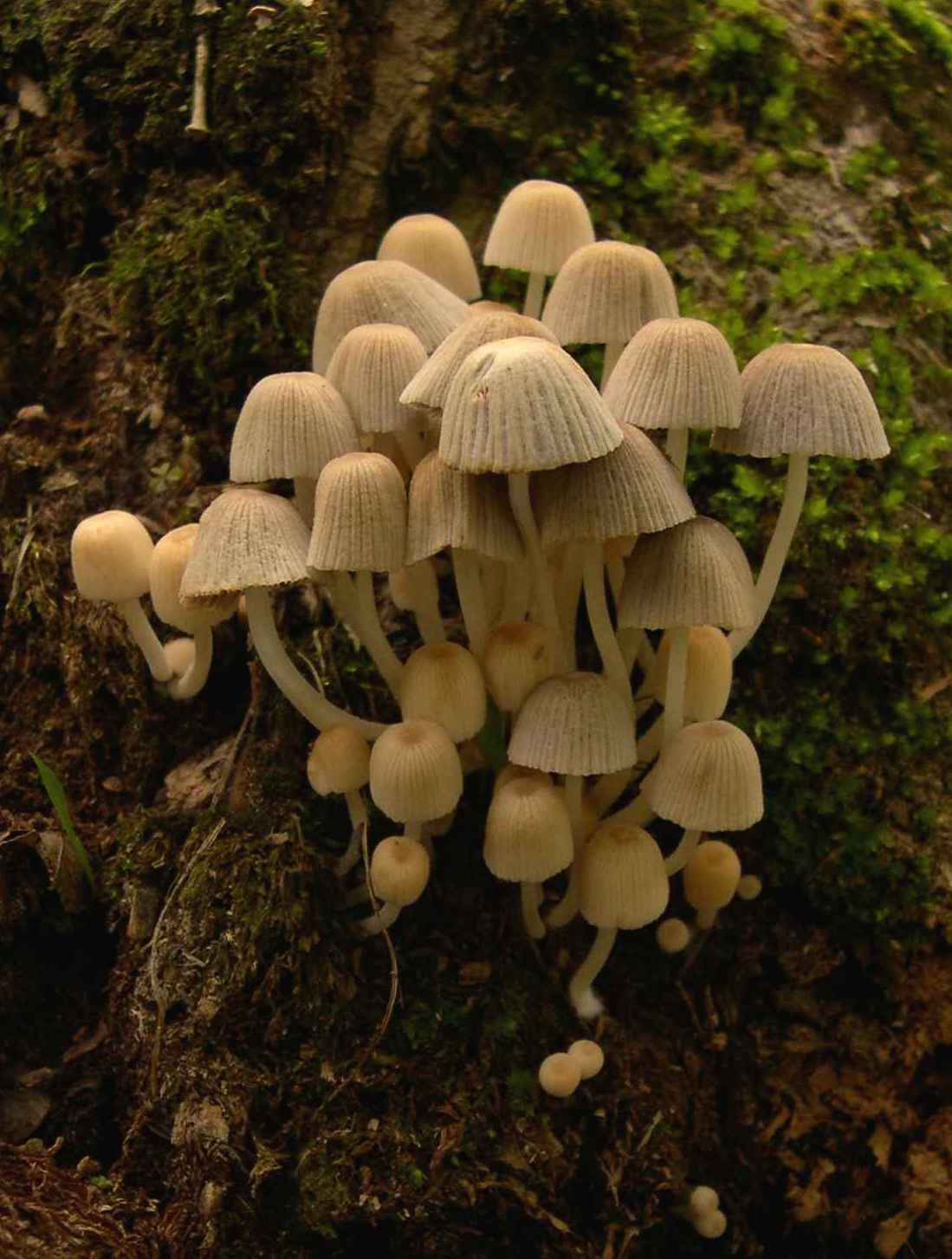
The related species Coprinellus disseminatus invariably grows in large clusters on wood.

The edible Coprinellus bisporus is nearly identical but lacks the yellowish cap granules and only has two spores per basidium. The scaly inky cap (Coprinus variegatus = Coprinus quadrifidus) has a grayish-brown cap with dull white to brownish scales; its odor is disagreeable. The trooping crumble cap (Coprinellus disseminatus, edible) has smaller, yellow-brown to grey-brown caps and white gills that turn black but do not dissolve away; it always grows in large clusters on rotting wood (sometimes buried wood). Coprinopsis atramentaria is a larger, gray species that grows in dense clusters on stumps or on the ground from buried wood, lacks glistening particles on the cap, and the cap and gills dissolve at maturity. Coprinellus radians develops singly or in clumps on wood, from a tufted mat of coarse yellow-orange mycelium. Coprinellus truncorum is also covered with glistening granules and is said to be almost indistinguishable from C. micaceus in the field; microscopy is needed to tell the difference, as C. truncorum has ellipsoid spores with a rounded germ pore, compared to the shield-shaped (mitriform) spores with truncated germ pores of C. micaceus. One study suggests that compared to C. truncorum, C. micaceus is browner in the center of the cap (rather than grayish) and has a greater tendency to grow in clusters; more molecular evidence is required to determine if the two taxa are genetically identical. C. flocculosus is another similar species.

== Ecology, habitat and distribution ==
Coprinellus micaceus is a saprotrophic species, deriving nutrients from dead and decomposing organic matter, and grows in and around stumps or logs of broad-leaved trees or attached to buried wood. It prefers feeding on bark, particularly the secondary phloem, rather than the wood. In the scheme of the succession of fungal species involved in the decomposition of wood, C. micaceus is a late stage colonizer, and prefers to feed on wood that has already decomposed sufficiently to have reached "a friable softened consistency". A 2010 study suggests that the fungus can also live as an endophyte, inhabiting the woody tissue of healthy trees without causing disease symptoms. The fungus is also associated with disturbed or developed ground, such as the sides of roads and paths, gardens, building sites and the edges of parking lots; it has also been noted for growing indoors on rotting wood in humid environments. In one instance it was discovered about 120 m (400 ft) underground in an abandoned coal mine, growing on wooden gangways and props used to support the roof.

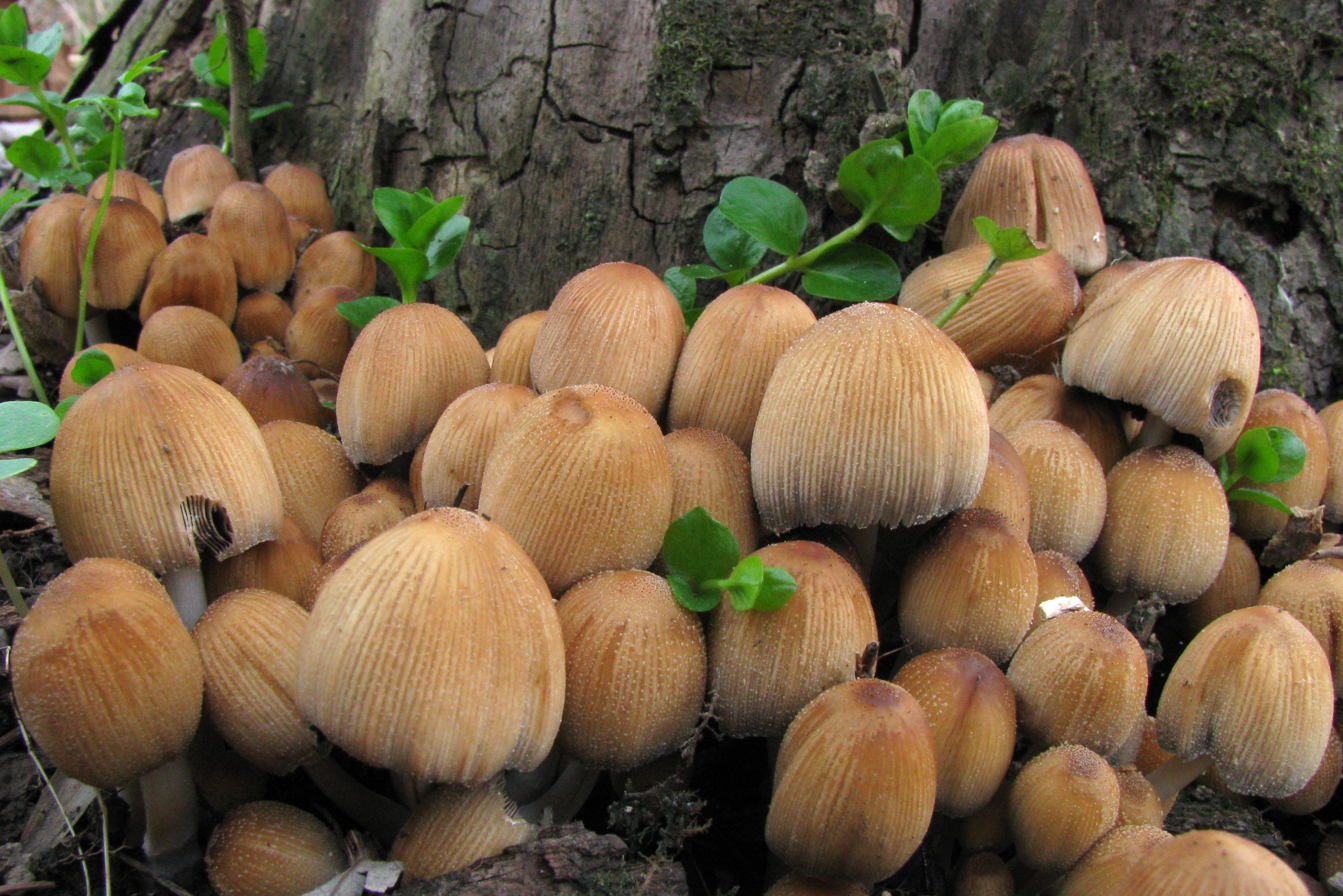
A cluster of fruit bodies at the base of a tree in Wayne National Forest, Ohio, US

Fruit bodies are commonly found growing in dense clusters, but can also be found growing singly or in small clumps, especially in forested areas. In North America, C. micaceus is one of the first edible mushrooms to appear in the spring, and fruits from April to September. In Europe, it fruits from May to December. Although it can grow at any time of the year, it is more prevalent during the spring and fall, coinciding with the higher humidity resulting from spring and autumn rains. A study of air quality conducted in the city of Santiago de Compostela in the Iberian Peninsula, concluded that most "Coprinus" spores present in the atmosphere belonged to C. micaceus, and that the number of spores went up with increased humidity and rainfall, but decreased with greater temperatures. The species is known for reappearing with successive fruitings at the same location. In one case, a total of 38 lb (17.2 kg) of fresh mushrooms were collected from one elm stump in 10 successive crops over a spring and summer.

Coprinellus micaceus has a cosmopolitan distribution, and has been collected in northern Africa, South Africa, Europe (including Turkey), North America (as far north as Alaska), the Hawaiian islands, South America, India, Australia, New Zealand, and Japan. Phylogenetic analysis of rDNA sequences from specimens collected in southeastern Asia and Hawaii show that the Hawaiian species form a distinct clade with little genetic diversity compared to Asian populations; this suggests that the Hawaiian populations have been introduced relatively recently and have not had much time to develop genetic variation. One study suggests that in South Africa, where C. micaceus is rare, it has been frequently confused with the similar-appearing C. truncorum, a more common species in that region. A similar inference has been raised about North American species.

== Edibility ==
Coprinellus micaceus is an edible species, and cooking inactivates the enzymes that cause autodigestion or deliquescence—a process that can begin as soon as one hour after collection. It is considered good for omelettes, and as a flavor for sauces, although it is "a very delicate species easily spoiled by overcooking". The flavor is so delicate that it is easy to overpower and hide with almost anything. The fungus also appeals to fruit flies of the genus Drosophila, who frequently use the fruit bodies as hosts for larvae production.

A study of the mineral contents of various edible mushrooms found that C. micaceus contained the highest concentration of potassium in the 34 species tested, close to half a gram of potassium per kilogram of mushroom. Because the species can bioaccumulate detrimental heavy metals like lead and cadmium, it has been advised to restrict consumption of specimens collected from roadsides or other collection sites that may be exposed to or contain pollutants.

== Bioactive compounds ==
Research into the natural product chemistry of Coprinellus micaceus has revealed the presence of several chemical compounds unique to the species. Micaceol is a sterol with "modest" antibacterial activity against the pathogens Corynebacterium xerosis and Staphylococcus aureus. The compound (Z,Z)-4-oxo-2,5-heptadienedioic acid has inhibitory activity against glutathione S-transferase, an enzyme that has been implicated in the resistance of cancer cells against chemotherapeutic agents, especially alkylating drugs. A 2003 study did not find any antibacterial activity in this species. A 1962 publication reported the presence of the biologically active indole compound tryptamine in C. micaceus, although the concentration was not determined. The fruit bodies additionally produce a variety of pigment compounds known as melanins—complex chemical polymers that contribute to the formation of soil humus after the fruit bodies have disintegrated. C. micaceus has been found to be devoid of the toxin coprine, the disulfiram-mimicking chemical found in C. atramentaria that causes illness when consumed simultaneously with alcohol.
