= Leucocoprinus revolutus =

Scientific classification
- Kingdom: Fungi
- Division: Basidiomycota
- Class: Agaricomycetes
- Order: Agaricales
- Family: Agaricaceae
- Genus: Leucocoprinus
- Species: L. revolutus

Binomial name
- Leucocoprinus revolutus Raithelh. (1987)

Synonyms
- Lepiota revoluta Rick (1937)

Species of fungus

Leucocoprinus revolutus is a species of mushroom producing fungus in the family Agaricaceae.

== Taxonomy ==
It was described in 1937 by the mycologist Johannes Rick who classified it as Lepiota revoluta. Rick also noted a possible similarity to Lepiota spodolepsis as classified by Berk. & Broome however this species is not recorded in Species Fungorum or Mycobank and no citation is given for the text in which it may have been described.

In 1987 it was reclassified as Leucocoprinus revolutus by the mycologist Jörg Raithelhuber.

== Description ==
Leucocoprinus revolutus is a small dapperling mushroom.

Cap: 8-13mm wide starting hemispherical before expanding and curving upwards with a small umbo. The surface is grey-blackish with striations from the margins and the cap flesh is membranous or fibrous. Gills: White, moderately densely spaced, bulging with smooth edges. Stem: 2 cm long and 2mm wide, stiff and filamentous. The surface is pale and smooth with a whitish ring. Spores: Raithelhuber described the spores as 'Oval, smooth. 7–8.1 x 4.4-5.2 μm.' However the spore size given by Rick is 5-6 x 3-4 μm.

== Etymology ==
The specific epithet revolutus is Latin for rolled backward. This is in reference to the description of the cap shape given in Latin by Rick of 'hemisphaerico-revoluto'.

== Habitat and distribution ==
The specimens were found growing on the ground in Brazil.
