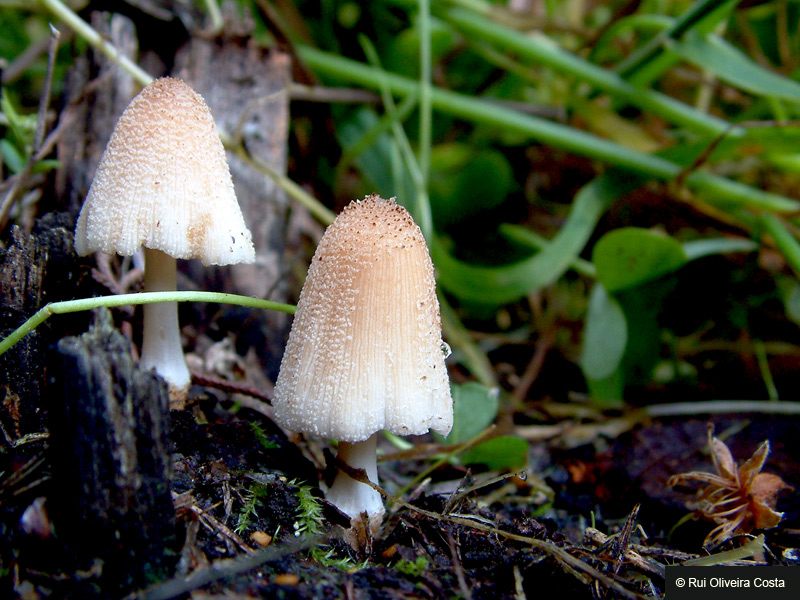

Scientific classification
- Domain: Eukaryota
- Kingdom: Fungi
- Division: Basidiomycota
- Class: Agaricomycetes
- Order: Agaricales
- Family: Psathyrellaceae
- Genus: Coprinellus
- Species: C. truncorum

Binomial name
- Coprinellus truncorum (Scop.) Redhead, Vilgalys & Moncalvo (2001)

Synonyms
- Agaricus truncorum Scop. (1772); Agaricus aquosus Huds. (1778); Coprinus truncorum (Scop.) Fr. (1838); Agaricus succineus Batsch (1783); Coprinus truncorum var. eccentricus Bogart (1975)

= Coprinellus truncorum =

Species of fungus

Coprinellus truncorum is a species of mushroom-forming fungus in the family Psathyrellaceae. Part of the cluster of mushrooms morphologically related to Coprinellus micaceus, this species can be distinguished from C. micaceus by a smooth, rather than pruinose (powdery) stipe, and by having more elliptical spores. Although not conclusively proven, this species may be conspecific with C. micaceus.
