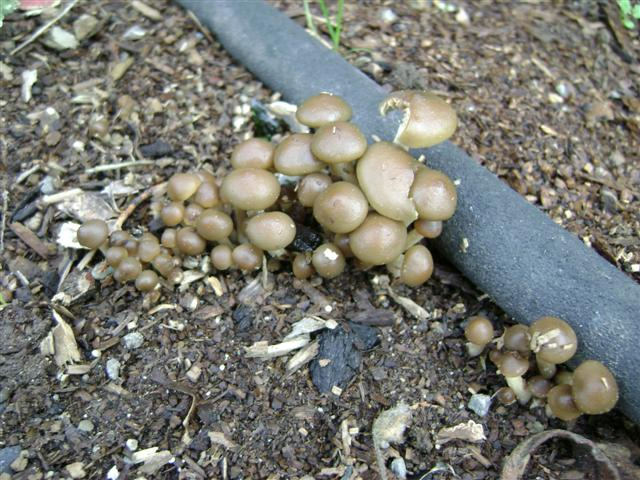

Scientific classification
- Kingdom: Fungi
- Division: Basidiomycota
- Class: Agaricomycetes
- Order: Agaricales
- Family: Hymenogastraceae
- Genus: Psilocybe
- Species: P. stuntzii

Binomial name
- Psilocybe stuntzii Guzmán & J. Ott

= Psilocybe stuntzii =

Species of fungus

Psilocybe stuntzii
- Mycological characteristics
- Gills on hymenium
- Cap is convex or umbonate
- Hymenium is adnate or sinuate
- Stipe has a ring
- Spore print is purple-brown
- Ecology is saprotrophic
- Edibility is psychoactive

Psilocybe stuntzii, also known as Stuntz's blue legs and blue ringers it is a psilocybin mushroom of the family Hymenogastraceae, having psilocybin and psilocin as main active compounds.

== Taxonomy ==
The mushroom is named in honor of mycologist Daniel Stuntz of the University of Washington.

== Description ==
The pileus is 0.5–3.5 centimetres (1/4–1 1/2 in), obtusely conic to convex, expanding to convex-umbonate or flat with age. The margin is translucent-striate when moist and uplifted in age. It is hygrophanous, glabrous, dark chestnut brown while lighter towards the center. The pileus is olive-greenish at times, fading to a pale yellowish brown or pale yellow. It is viscid when moist from a gelatinous pellicle, staining slightly greenish-blue when injured or with age.

The gills are adnate or sinuate or adnexed, close to sub-distant and moderately broad, yellowish brown at first, soon violet brown or chocolate brown to blackish violet, and uniform or somewhat mottled, with whitish edges. The spore print is dark violaceous brown.

The stipe is 2–7.5 cm x 1.5–6 mm, equal or slightly enlarged at the base, cylindric or subcylindric, twisted striate at times, flexuous, glabrous to slightly fibrillose, dry, stuffed with a pith and becoming hollow, and white or whitish silky to ochraceous or brownish fibrillose. The partial veil is thinly membranous, leaving a fragile annulus that becomes more noticeable as it darkens with spores. It stains blue-green when injured, most noticeably on the ring.

The taste and odor are farinaceous.

=== Microscopic features ===
The spores are 8.2–12.6 x (6) 7.1–7.7 x 5.5–6.6 μm, subrhomboid in face view, subellipsoid in side view, with a hilar appendage visible and a truncate apex with a broad germ pore, thick walled, and dingy yellow brown.

The basidia are 16.5–25 x 5.5–7.7 μm, 4-spored, and hyaline. Pleurocystidia are absent and cheilocystidia are 22–27.5 x 4.4–6.6 μm, abundant, forming a sterile band, hyaline, lageniform, fusiform-lanceolate or fusoid-ampullaceous, with an elongate and flexuous neck, and are 1.6–2.2 μm in diameter, sometimes irregularly branched. Clamp connections are present.

== Habitat and distribution ==
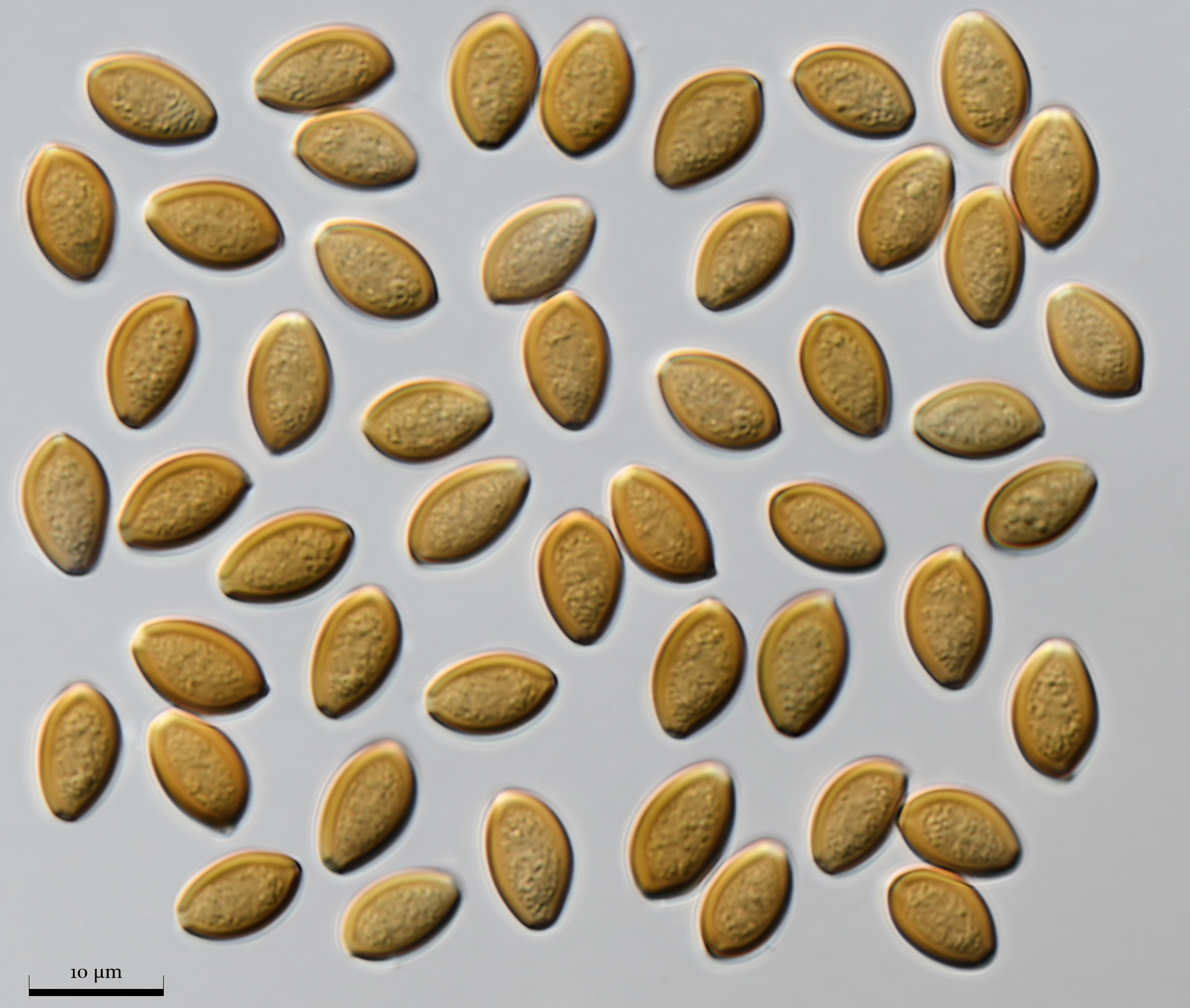
Psilocybe stuntzii spores seen through a microscope

Psilocybe stuntzii is found growing scattered to gregarious to cespitose, rarely solitary, in conifer wood chips and bark mulch, in soils rich in woody debris, and in new lawns of freshly laid sod or any newly mulched garden throughout the western region of the Pacific Northwest. It appears from late July through December, being observed all year long in the Seattle area, also reportedly appearing in California, rarely as far south as Santa Cruz. There was a time when this mushroom appeared in over 40 percent of all new lawns and mulched in areas in the Puget Sound region of the Pacific Northwest. Due to a disappearance of pastures south of Seattle in the Tukwila-Kent-Auburn areas, this mushroom now only appears sporadically in certain new lawns which are well fertilized and manicured.

== Edibility ==
This mushroom is hallucinogenic. Additionally, it closely resembles the highly toxic Galerina marginata, and several poisonings have been attributed to collectors consuming G. marginata after mistaking them for hallucinogenic P. stuntzii.

== See also ==
- Psilocybin mushrooms
- List of Psilocybin mushrooms
