= Umbo (mycology) =

Mushroom cap protuberance

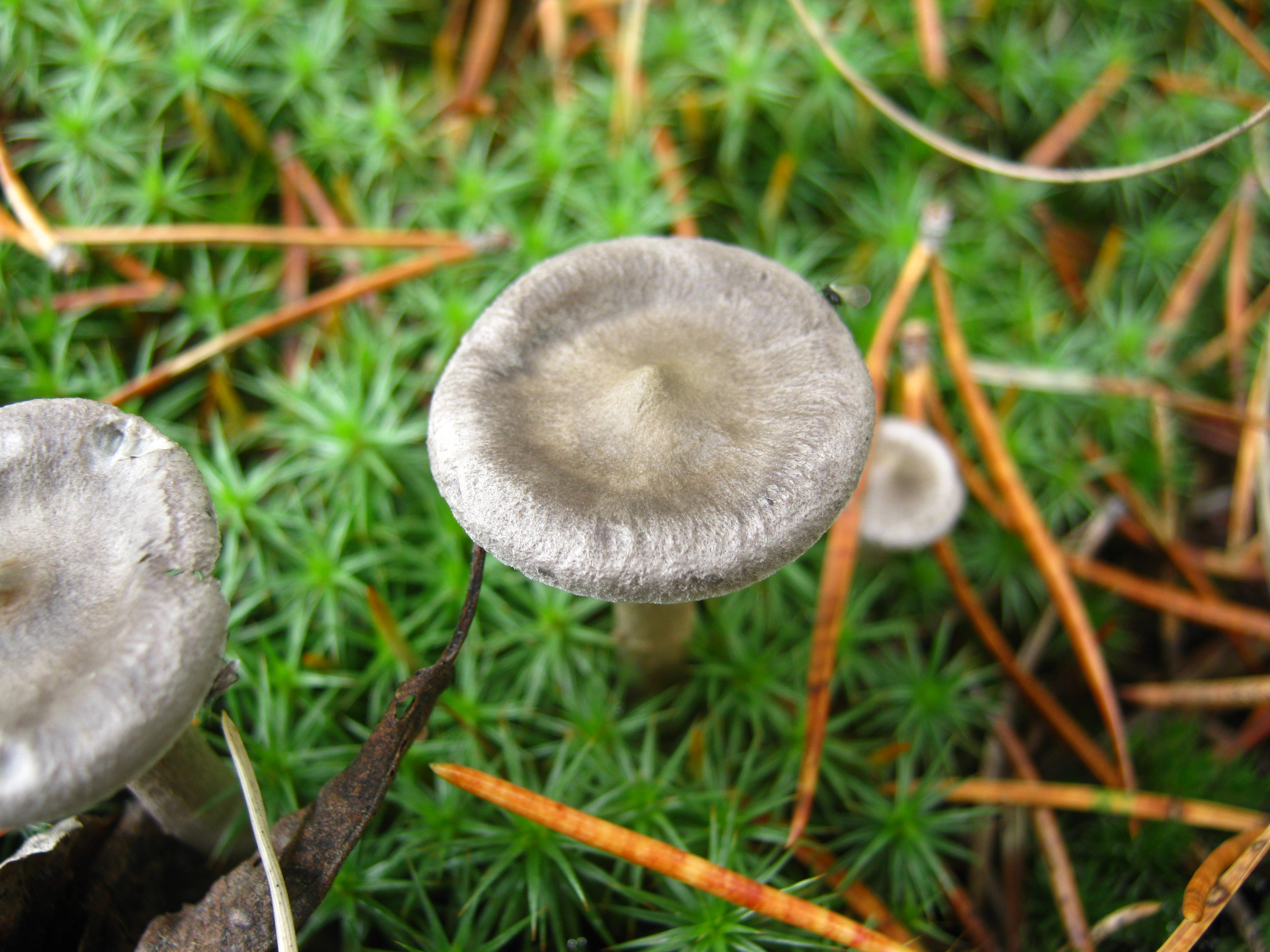
Cantharellula umbonata has an umbo.

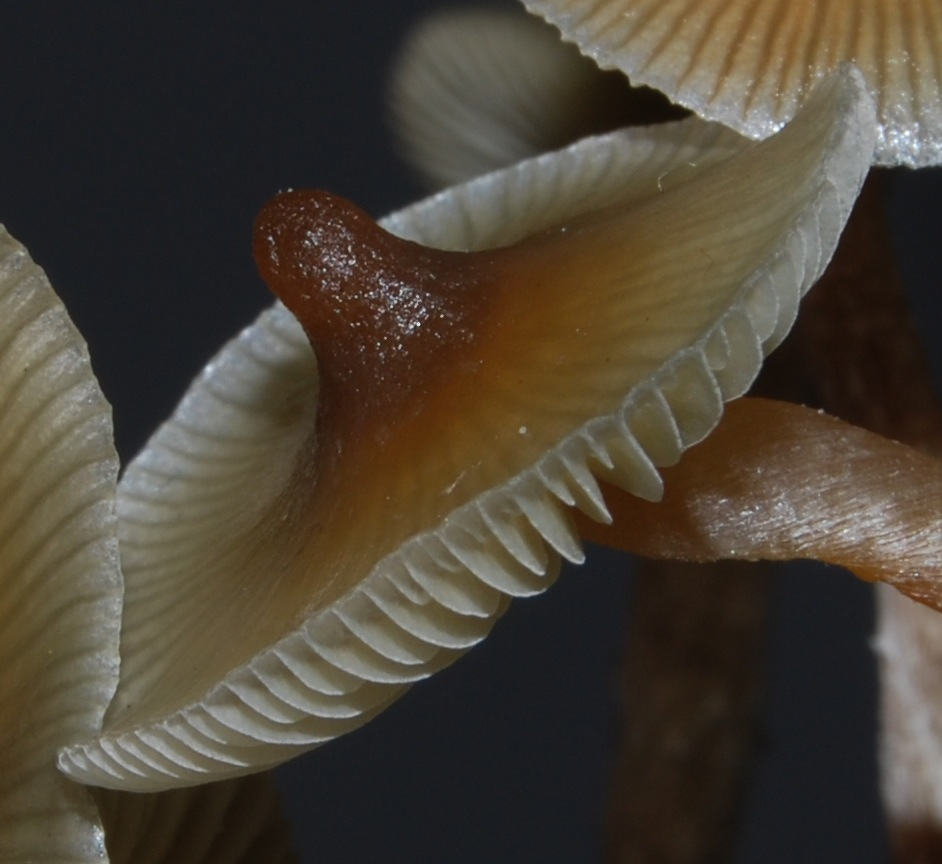
The cap of Psilocybe makarorae is acutely papillate.

An umbo is a raised area in the center of a mushroom cap. Caps that possess this feature are called umbonate. Umbos that are sharply pointed are called acute, while those that are more rounded are broadly umbonate. If the umbo is elongated, it is cuspidate, and if the umbo is sharply delineated but not elongated (somewhat resembling the shape of a human areola), it is called mammilate or papillate.
