= List of Phaeocollybia species =

This is a list of species in the agaric genus Phaeocollybia.

== Key ==
Name	The binomial name of the Phaeocollybia species.
Authority	The author citation—the person who first described the species using an available scientific name, eventually combined with the one who placed it in Phaeocollybia, and using standardized abbreviations.
Year	The year in which the species was named, or transferred to the genus Phaeocollybia. Where the actual year of publication (as defined for the purpose of priority) differs from the printed date, the date as given on the reference is given in quotes.
Distribution	The geographical distribution of the species.

== Species ==
Name	Authority	Year	Distribution
Phaeocollybia amazonica	Singer	1962	Bolivia
Phaeocollybia ambigua	E.Horak & Halling	1991	Colombia
Phaeocollybia ammiratii	Norvell	2000	USA
Phaeocollybia amygdalospora	Bandala & E.Horak	1996	Durango
Phaeocollybia arduennensis	Bon	1979	France
Phaeocollybia attenuata	Singer	1951	USA
Phaeocollybia australiensis	B.J.Rees & A.E.Wood	1996	Australia
Phaeocollybia benzokauffmanii	Norvell	2000	USA
Phaeocollybia bicolor	E.Horak	1977	Papua New Guinea
Phaeocollybia brasiliensis	I.A.Aguiar ex Singer	1987	Brazil
Phaeocollybia californica	A.H.Sm.	1957	USA
Phaeocollybia carmanahensis	Redhead & Norvell	1993	Canada
Phaeocollybia caudata	E.Horak & Halling	1991	Colombia
Phaeocollybia christinae	(Fr.) R.Heim	1931	Europe, eastern North America
Phaeocollybia cidaris	(Fr.) Romagn.	1944	?
Phaeocollybia columbiana	Singer	1970	Colombia
Phaeocollybia coniuncta	E.Horak	1980	Sikkim
Phaeocollybia corneri	E.Horak	1977	Indonesia, Borneo
Phaeocollybia deceptiva	A.H.Sm. & Trappe	1972	USA
Phaeocollybia dissiliens	E.Horak	1977	USA
Phaeocollybia elaeophylla	Singer	1987	Brazil
Phaeocollybia fallax	A.H.Sm.	1995	USA
Phaeocollybia festiva	(Fr.) R.Heim	1944	
Phaeocollybia flava	I.A.Aguiar ex Singer	1995	Brazil
Phaeocollybia graveolens	B.J.Rees & K.Syme	1999	Australia
Phaeocollybia gregaria	A.H.Sm. & Trappe	1972	USA
Phaeocollybia guzmanii	Bandala & Montoya	1994	Mexico
Phaeocollybia hamadryas	(Fr.) Romagn.	1944	
Phaeocollybia herrerae	Bandala & Montoya	1996	Morelos
Phaeocollybia hilaris	(Fr.) Romagn.	1995	
Phaeocollybia intermedia	Corner & E.Horak	1995	Indonesia, Borneo
Phaeocollybia jennyae	(P.Karst.) Romagn.	1944	
Phaeocollybia kauffmanii	(A.H.Sm.) Singer	1940	
Phaeocollybia lateraria	A.H.Sm.	1957	USA
Phaeocollybia latispora	Guzmán, Bandala & Montoya	1989	Mexico
Phaeocollybia lilacifolia	A.H.Sm.	1957	USA
Phaeocollybia longipes	E.Horak	1973	
Phaeocollybia longistipitata	Halling & E.Horak	2008	Costa Rica
Phaeocollybia lugubris	(Fr.) R.Heim	1931	
Phaeocollybia luteosquamulosa	Novell	2000	USA
Phaeocollybia martinicensis	Guzmán, Montoya & Bandala	1989	Mexico
Phaeocollybia megalospora	I.A.Aguiar ex Singer	1987	Brazil
Phaeocollybia mexicana	Corner & E.Horak	1977	Mexico
Phaeocollybia minuta	E.Horak	1973	New Zealand
Phaeocollybia moseri	Bandala & Guzmán	1996	Chiapas
Phaeocollybia muscicolor	E.Horak	1977	Papua New Guinea
Phaeocollybia neosimilis	Singer	1986	
Phaeocollybia nigripes	Wartchow & Coimbra	2012	Brazil
Phaeocollybia ochraceocana	Norvell & Exeter	2007	USA
Phaeocollybia odorata	E.Horak	1977	Papua New Guinea
Phaeocollybia oligoporpa	Singer	1987	Costa Rica
Phaeocollybia olivacea	A.H.Sm.	1957	USA
Phaeocollybia oregonensis	A.H.Sm. & Trappe	1972	USA
Phaeocollybia parvispora	Corner & E.Horak	1977	Singapore
Phaeocollybia phaeogaleroides	Norvell	2002	USA
Phaeocollybia piceae	A.H.Sm. & Trappe	1972	USA
Phaeocollybia pleurocystidiata	Norvell & Redhead	2000	USA
Phaeocollybia primulina	(Berk.) E.Horak	1977	
Phaeocollybia procera	E.Horak	1977	Papua New Guinea
Phaeocollybia pseudofestiva	A.H.Sm.	1957	USA
Phaeocollybia pseudolugubris	Bandala & E.Horak	1996	Mexico
Phaeocollybia purpurea	T.Z.Wei, S.Z.Fu, P.P.Qu & Y.J.Yao	2010	China
Phaeocollybia quercetorum	Singer	1995	Costa Rica
Phaeocollybia querqueti	Corner & E.Horak	1977	Indonesia, Borneo
Phaeocollybia radicata	(Murrill) Singer	1951	USA
Phaeocollybia rancida	E.Horak	1974	India, Himachal Pradesh
Phaeocollybia ratticauda	E.Horak	1973	New Zealand
Phaeocollybia redheadii	Norvell	2000	Canada
Phaeocollybia rifflipes	Norvell	2002	USA
Phaeocollybia rufipes	H.E.Bigelow	1963	
Phaeocollybia rufotubulina	Norvell	2004	
Phaeocollybia scatesiae	A.H.Sm. & Trappe	1972	USA
Phaeocollybia similis	(Bres.) Singer	1951	China
Phaeocollybia singeri	Guzmán, Bandala & Montoya	1989	Mexico
Phaeocollybia singularis	E.Horak & Halling	1991	Colombia
Phaeocollybia sipei	A.H.Sm.	1957	USA
Phaeocollybia smithii	Bandala & Montoya	1995	USA
Phaeocollybia spadicea	A.H.Sm.	1957	USA
Phaeocollybia sparsilamellae	P.G.Liu	1995	China
Phaeocollybia spoliata	E.Horak	1974	
Phaeocollybia subarduennensis	Singer	1987	Costa Rica
Phaeocollybia subattenuata	Singer	1962	Bolivia, Pando, Madre de Dios
Phaeocollybia tasmanica	B.J.Rees & A.E.Wood	1996	Australia
Phaeocollybia tentaculata	E.Horak	1995	Papua New Guinea
Phaeocollybia tibiikauffmanii	Norvell	1995	
Phaeocollybia viridis	E.Horak	1995	Papua New Guinea
