= Gliophorus bichromus =

Scientific classification
- Domain: Eukaryota
- Kingdom: Fungi
- Division: Basidiomycota
- Class: Agaricomycetes
- Order: Agaricales
- Family: Hygrophoraceae
- Genus: Gliophorus
- Species: G. bichromus

Binomial name
- Gliophorus bichromus E.Horak (1973)

Species of fungus

Gliophorus bichromus is a species of agaric fungus in the family Hygrophoraceae. Found in New Zealand, it was described by mycologist Egon Horak in 1973.

== Description ==
The cap is about 10mm in diameter, is lemon yellow, and convex. The color can fade in maturity to more of a grey, especially in the center. The gills are curved and are whitish-yellow. The stipe (stem) is yellow at the base, and white at the apex, about 15mm tall. Taste and odor are not distinctive and the KOH reaction on the cap is negative. The "Spores [are] 5.5-7.5 x 3-3.5 μm, ellipsoid, smooth, inamyloid. Basidia 28-32 x 4-5 μm, 4-spored. Cystidia absent".

G. bichromus grows under Nothofagus cliffortioides in New Zealands montane forest.

=== Similar Species ===
The genus Gliophorus can be distinguished from most other similar species by its entire fruiting body being slimy, rather than just the cap or stipe.

Mycena primulina can be distinguished microscopically by its abundant cheilocystidia and larger spore size.

Gliophorus chromolimoneus has a slightly larger cap, up to 30mm, and spores that are slightly larger at 6.5-9 X 4-5.5 μm.
