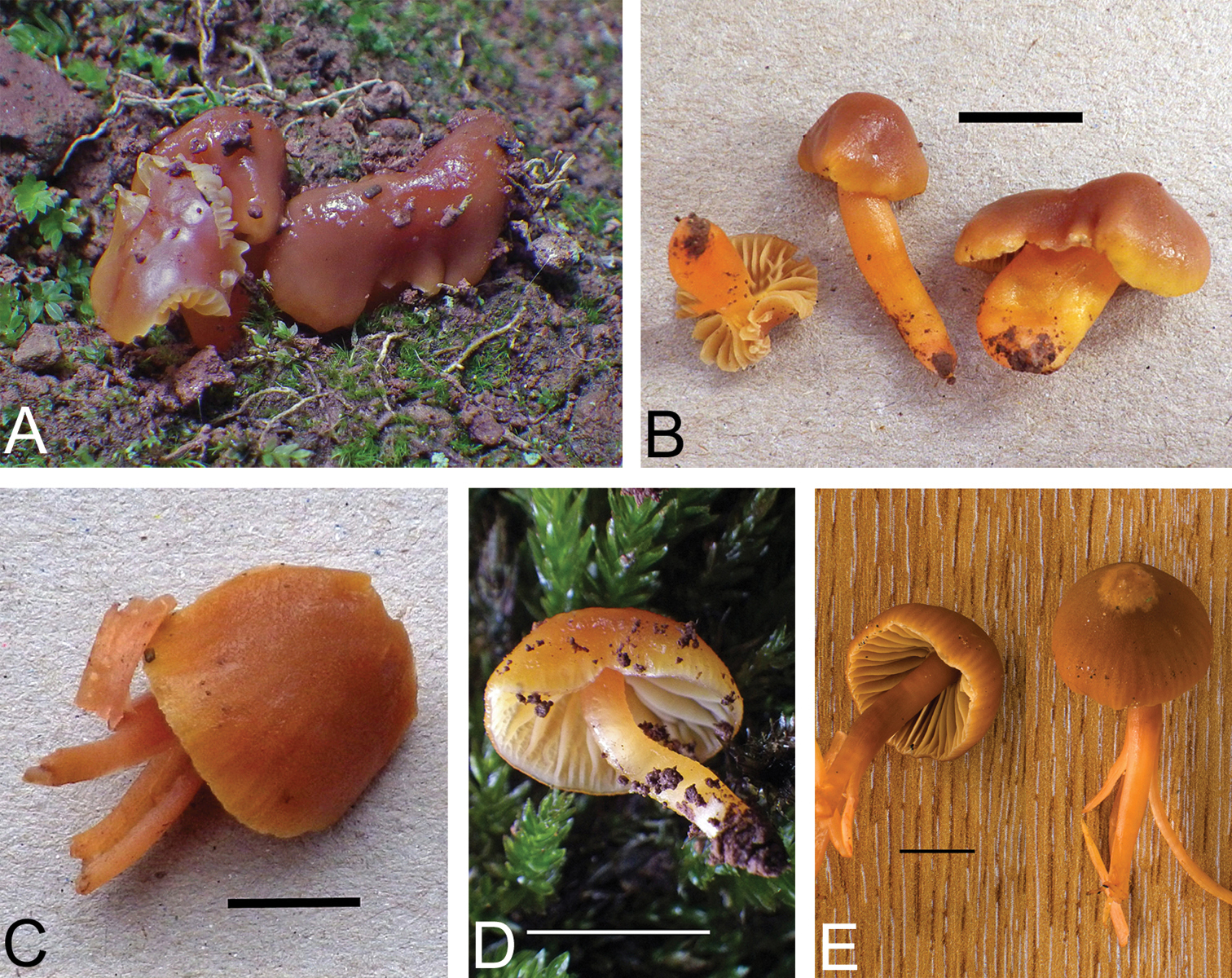

Conservation status
- Vulnerable (IUCN 3.1)

Scientific classification
- Kingdom: Fungi
- Division: Basidiomycota
- Class: Agaricomycetes
- Order: Agaricales
- Family: Hygrophoraceae
- Genus: Gliophorus
- Species: G. europerplexus

Binomial name
- Gliophorus europerplexus Dentinger, A.M.Ainsw., & P.F.Cannon (2013)

= Gliophorus europerplexus =

Species of fungus

Gliophorus europerplexus
- Mycological characteristics
- Gills on hymenium
- Cap is umbonate
- Hymenium is adnate
- Stipe is bare
- Spore print is white
- Ecology is mycorrhizal
- Edibility is unknown

Gliophorus europerplexus is a species of agaric (gilled mushroom) in the family Hygrophoraceae. It has been given the recommended English name of butterscotch waxcap. The species has a European distribution, occurring mainly in agriculturally unimproved grassland. Threats to its habitat have resulted in the species being assessed as globally "vulnerable" on the IUCN Red List of Threatened Species.

== Taxonomy ==
The species was first described from Wales in 2013, as a result of molecular research, based on cladistic analysis of DNA sequences. It was formerly considered to be conspecific with the North American species Gliophorus perplexus, which it otherwise resembles.

== Description ==
Basidiocarps are agaricoid, up to 60 mm (2.5 in) tall, the cap hemispherical to broadly umbonate becoming flat, up to 25 mm (1 in) across. The cap surface is smooth, highly viscid when damp, pink-brown to orange-brown. The lamellae (gills) are waxy, cap-coloured or paler. The stipe (stem) is smooth, viscid, cap-coloured or paler, lacking a ring. The spore print is white, the spores (under a microscope) smooth, inamyloid, ellipsoid, measuring about 7 to 9 by 4.5 to 5.5 μm.

=== Similar species ===
The parrot waxcap Gliophorus psittacinus is similar, but is typically green and, if not, retains this colour at the top of the stipe. The jubilee waxcap Gliophorus reginae is also similar, but has a dull violet-purple cap and white stipe.

== Distribution and habitat ==
The butterscotch waxcap is currently known from Wales, England, the Isle of Man (first recorded on 10 November 2022) and Spain, but is likely to be more widespread in western Europe. Like most other European waxcaps, it occurs in old, agriculturally unimproved, short-sward grassland (pastures and lawns).

Recent research suggests waxcaps are neither mycorrhizal nor saprotrophic but may be associated with mosses.

== Conservation ==
Gliophorus europerplexus is typical of waxcap grasslands, a declining habitat due to changing agricultural practices. As a result, the species is of global conservation concern and is listed as "vulnerable" on the IUCN Red List of Threatened Species.
