= Chromosera cyanophylla =

Scientific classification
- Kingdom: Fungi
- Division: Basidiomycota
- Class: Agaricomycetes
- Order: Agaricales
- Family: Hygrophoraceae
- Genus: Chromosera
- Species: C. cyanophylla

Binomial name
- Chromosera cyanophylla (Fr.) Redhead, Ammirati & Norvell (2011)

Synonyms
- Agaricus cyanophyllus Fr. (1861); Omphalia cyanophylla (Fr.) Quél. (1872); Omphalina cyanophylla (Fr.) Quél. (1886); Omphalina cyanophylla Courtec. & Bon (1986) nom. illeg.; Chromosera cyanophylla Redhead, Ammirati & Norvell (1995) nom. inval.

Species of fungus

Chromosera cyanophylla is a species of fungus in the genus Chromosera. It is the type species of Chromosera. In young specimens, the slimy cap and stem are yellow, and the gills are of a violet or lilac hue. The species can be found growing in small groups on the wood of conifers. It may resemble Gliophorus laetus.

It occurs in Europe and Asia. The species was previously reported from North America, but these reports belong to two other species: Chromosera lilacifolia, which occurs in eastern North America, and Chromosera loreleiae, which occurs in western North America.
