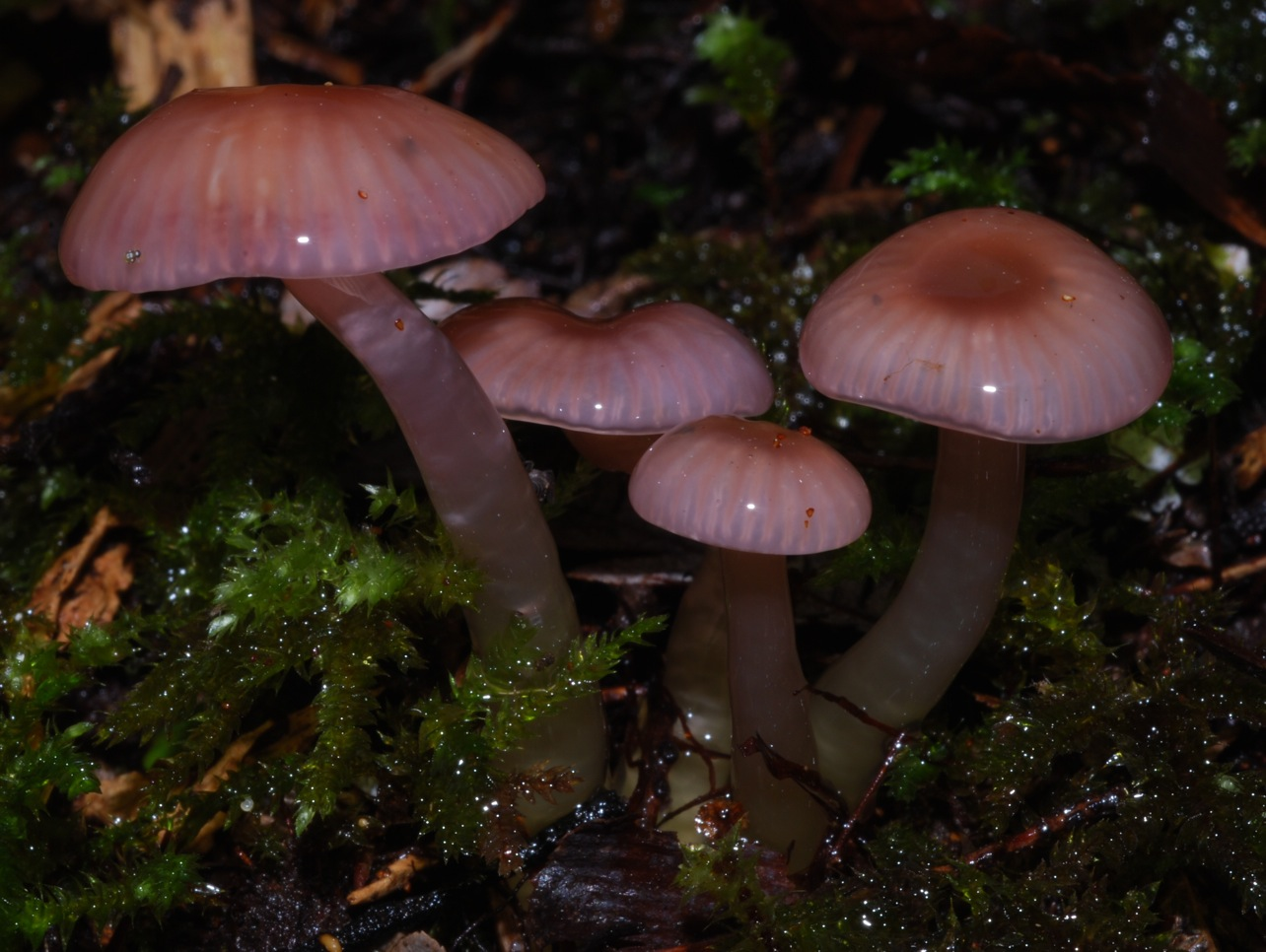

Scientific classification
- Domain: Eukaryota
- Kingdom: Fungi
- Division: Basidiomycota
- Class: Agaricomycetes
- Order: Agaricales
- Family: Hygrophoraceae
- Genus: Gliophorus
- Species: G. versicolor

Binomial name
- Gliophorus versicolor E.Horak (1973)

Synonyms
- Hygrocybe versicolor (E.Horak) Boertm. (2002)

= Gliophorus versicolor =

Species of fungus

Gliophorus versicolor is a species of agaric fungus in the family Hygrophoraceae. Found in New Zealand, it was described as new to science in 1973 by mycologist Egon Horak. Within the genus Gliophorus, it is classified in the section Glutinosae, a grouping of species characterized by having bright colors, decurrent gills, and a gelatinized subhymenium. Fruit bodies have hemispherical to convex caps typically measuring 20 mm (0.8 in), although some have been recorded up to 50 mm (2.0 in). Moist caps are gluey with a color ranging from reddish brown to pinkish-lilac; the cap margin has radial grooves mirroring the gills underneath. The gills have an adnate to somewhat decurrent attachment to the stipe. They are widely spaced with color similar to the cap, or whitish. The cylindrical, hollow stipe measures 2–7 cm (0.8–2.8 in) by 1.5–3 mm (0.06–0.12 in) thick. The fungus is saprobic, and fruits on the ground among Dacrycarpus and Nothofagus.
