= Phaeocollybia pseudolugubris =

Scientific classification
- Domain: Eukaryota
- Kingdom: Fungi
- Division: Basidiomycota
- Class: Agaricomycetes
- Order: Agaricales
- Family: Cortinariaceae
- Genus: Phaeocollybia
- Species: P. pseudolugubris

Binomial name
- Phaeocollybia pseudolugubris Bandala & E.Horak (1996)

Species of fungus

Phaeocollybia pseudolugubris is a species of fungus in the family Cortinariaceae. Found in the Popocatépetl region of México State, where it grows in forests of sacred fir (Abies religiosa) and pine, it was described as new to science in 1996 by mycologists Victor Bandala and Egon Horak. It is a member of section Versicolores in the genus Phaeocollybia. Its spores are more or less ellipsoidal to almond-shaped, typically measuring 8–9 by 4–5 μm. Clamp connections are absent from the hyphae.
