= Gliophorus pallidus =

- Gliophorus pallidus from Te Kauri Scenic Reserve

Scientific classification
- Kingdom: Fungi
- Division: Basidiomycota
- Class: Agaricomycetes
- Order: Agaricales
- Family: Hygrophoraceae
- Genus: Gliophorus
- Species: G. pallidus

Binomial name
- Gliophorus pallidus E.Horak (1973)

Species of fungus

Gliophorus pallidus is a species of agaric fungus in the family Hygrophoraceae. Found in New Zealand, it was described as new to science in 1973.
