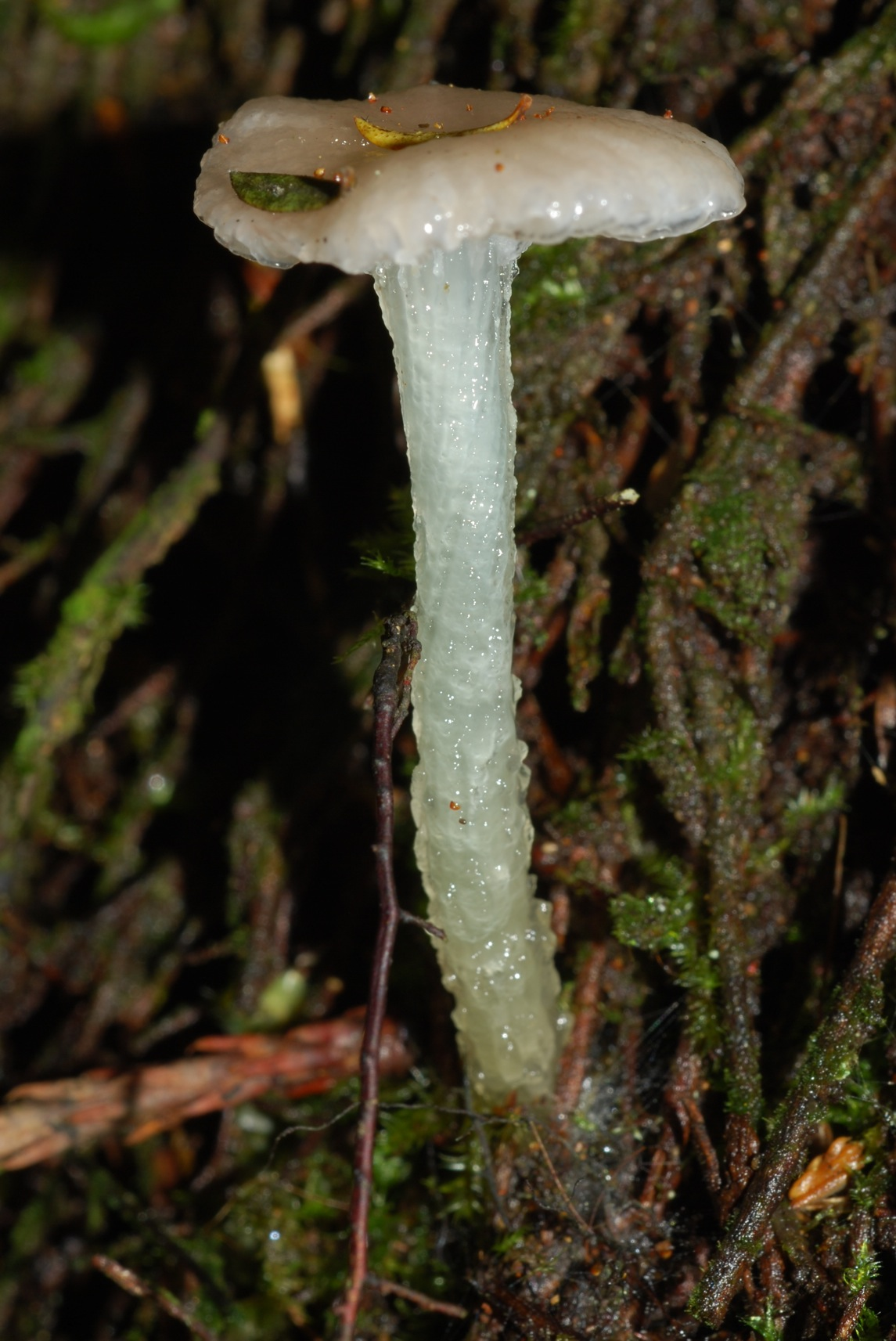

Scientific classification
- Kingdom: Fungi
- Division: Basidiomycota
- Class: Agaricomycetes
- Order: Agaricales
- Family: Hygrophoraceae
- Genus: Gliophorus
- Species: G. lilacipes

Binomial name
- Gliophorus lilacipes E.Horak (1973)

Synonyms
- Hygrocybe lilacipes (E.Horak) Boertm. (2002)

= Gliophorus lilacipes =

Species of fungus

Gliophorus lilacipes is a species of agaric fungus in the family Hygrophoraceae. Found in New Zealand in podocarp and beech forests, it was described by Egon Horak in 1973.

== Description ==
Gliophorus lilacipes has a cylindrical stipe (stalk) up to 60 mm high, and a hemispherical to plano-convex pileus (cap) with a diameter of 15 to 45 mm. Colour is variable with age and changes in moisture, with a blue-green-brown cap, lilac-blue to blue-green gills, and a stipe that is yellow at the base and lilac towards the top. Attachment of gills to the stipe is adnate to decurrent. Cap and gill edges are gelatinous and sticky, with glutinous threads forming at gill edge. Spores are 4.5–6 by 3–4.3 µm, ovoid in shape and smooth.
