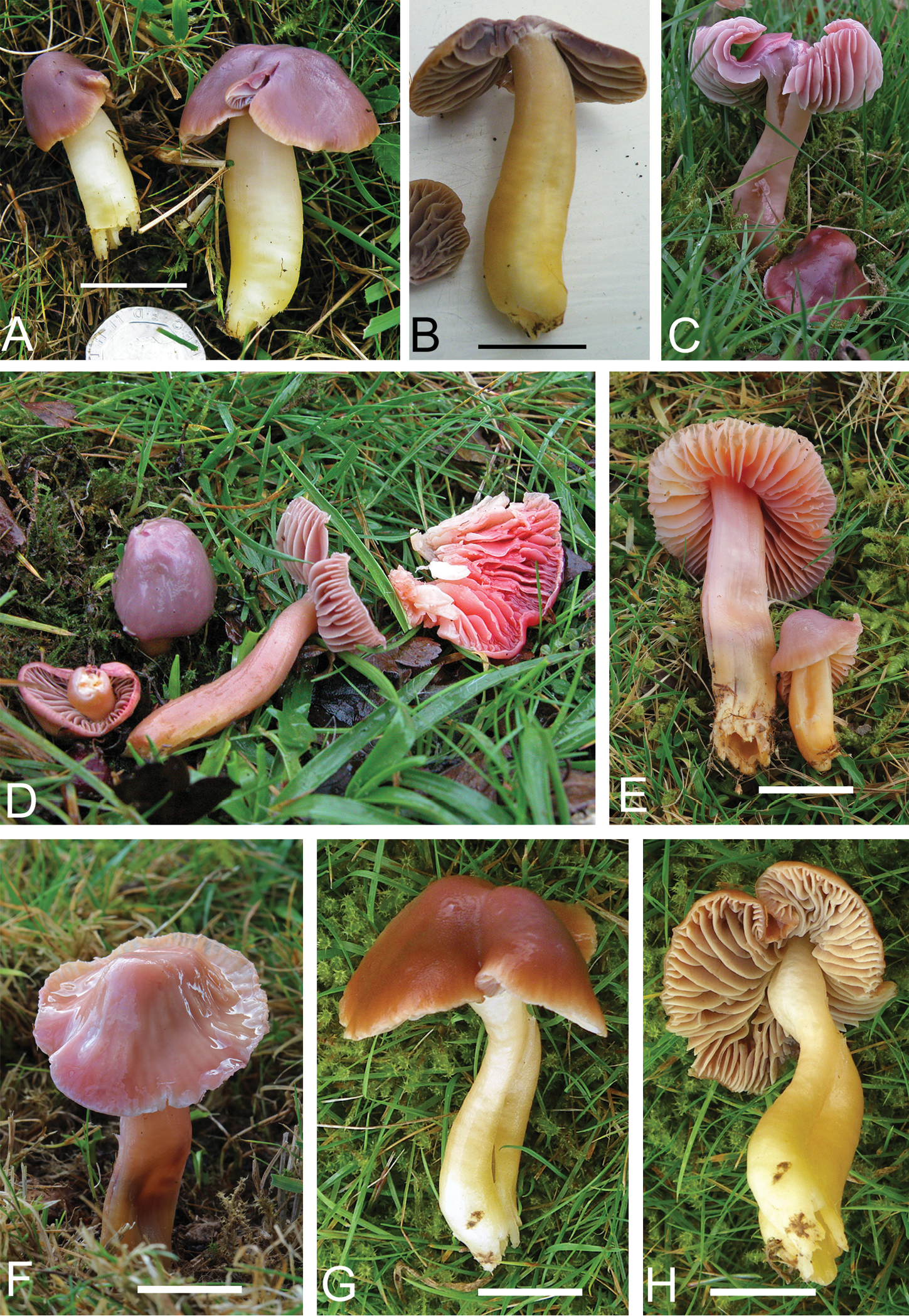
- Gliophorus reginae, showing colour variation

Conservation status
- Vulnerable (IUCN 3.1)

Scientific classification
- Kingdom: Fungi
- Division: Basidiomycota
- Class: Agaricomycetes
- Order: Agaricales
- Family: Hygrophoraceae
- Genus: Gliophorus
- Species: G. reginae

Binomial name
- Gliophorus reginae Dentinger, A.M.Ainsw., & P.F.Cannon

Synonyms
- Hygrocybe sciophanoides var. carneoviolacea B.Lefebvre

= Gliophorus reginae =

Species of fungus

Gliophorus reginae is a species of agaric (gilled mushroom) in the family Hygrophoraceae. It has been given the recommended English name of jubilee waxcap. The species has a European distribution, occurring mainly in agriculturally unimproved grassland. Threats to its habitat have resulted in the species being assessed as globally "vulnerable" on the IUCN Red List of Threatened Species.

== Taxonomy ==
The species was first described from England in 2013, as a result of molecular research, based on cladistic analysis of DNA sequences. It was formerly considered one of several colour variants of the widespread Parrot Waxcap Gliophorus psittacinus, which it otherwise resembles. The Latin epithet reginae (meaning "of the queen") was given in honour of the 2012 diamond jubilee and coronation anniversary of Queen Elizabeth II and also because of the royal purple cap colour of the basidiocarps.

== Description ==
Basidiocarps are agaricoid, up to 70 mm (2.75 in) tall, the cap hemispherical to broadly umbonate becoming flat, up to 55 mm (2 in) across. The cap surface is smooth, highly viscid when damp, dull violet-purple, sometimes with pink, red, or brown tones. The lamellae (gills) are waxy, pale cap-coloured, sometimes with yellowish tints. The stipe (stem) is smooth, viscid, white, sometimes yellowish at the base, lacking a ring. The spore print is white, the spores (under a microscope) smooth, inamyloid, ellipsoid, measuring about 6 to 8.5 by 4 to 5.5 μm.

=== Similar species ===
The Parrot Waxcap Gliophorus psittacinus is similar, but is typically green and, if not, retains this colour at the top of the stipe. The Butterscotch Waxcap Gliophorus europerplexus is also similar, but is orange-brown to pinkish brown.

== Distribution and habitat ==
The Jubilee Waxcap is currently known from England and Wales, Denmark, France, Slovakia, and Spain. Like most other European waxcaps, it occurs in old, agriculturally unimproved, short-sward grassland (pastures and lawns).

Recent research suggests waxcaps are neither mycorrhizal nor saprotrophic but may be associated with mosses.

== Conservation ==
Gliophorus reginae is typical of waxcap grasslands, a declining habitat due to changing agricultural practices. As a result, the species is of global conservation concern and is listed as "vulnerable" on the IUCN Red List of Threatened Species. Gliophorus reginae also appears on the official national red list of threatened fungi in Denmark.
