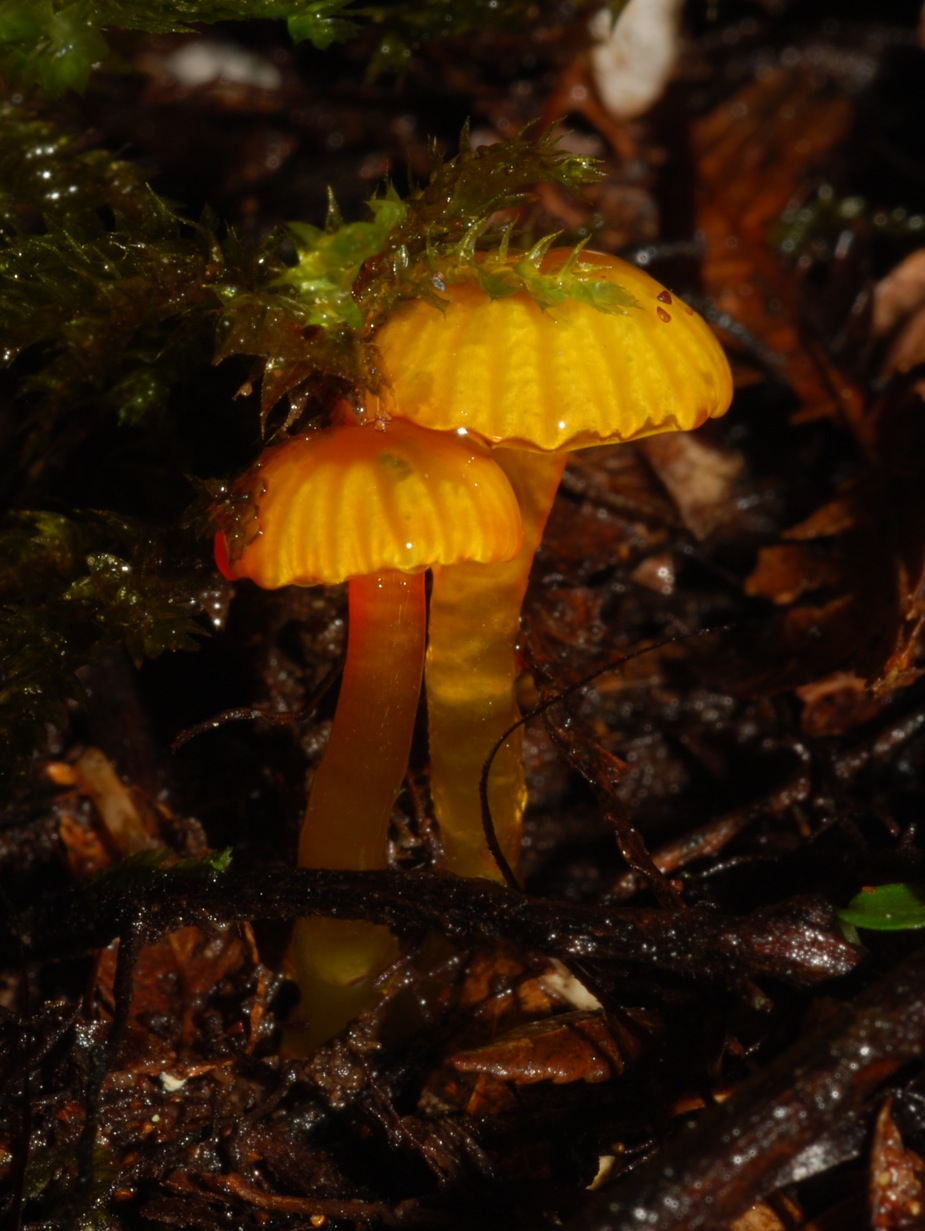

Scientific classification
- Domain: Eukaryota
- Kingdom: Fungi
- Division: Basidiomycota
- Class: Agaricomycetes
- Order: Agaricales
- Family: Hygrophoraceae
- Genus: Gliophorus
- Species: G. viscaurantius

Binomial name
- Gliophorus viscaurantius E.Horak (1973)

Synonyms
- Hygrocybe viscaurantia (E. Horak) Boertm., Bibliotheca Mycologica 192: 71 (2002))

= Gliophorus viscaurantius =

Species of fungus

Gliophorus viscaurantius is a species of agaric fungus in the family Hygrophoraceae found in New Zealand.
