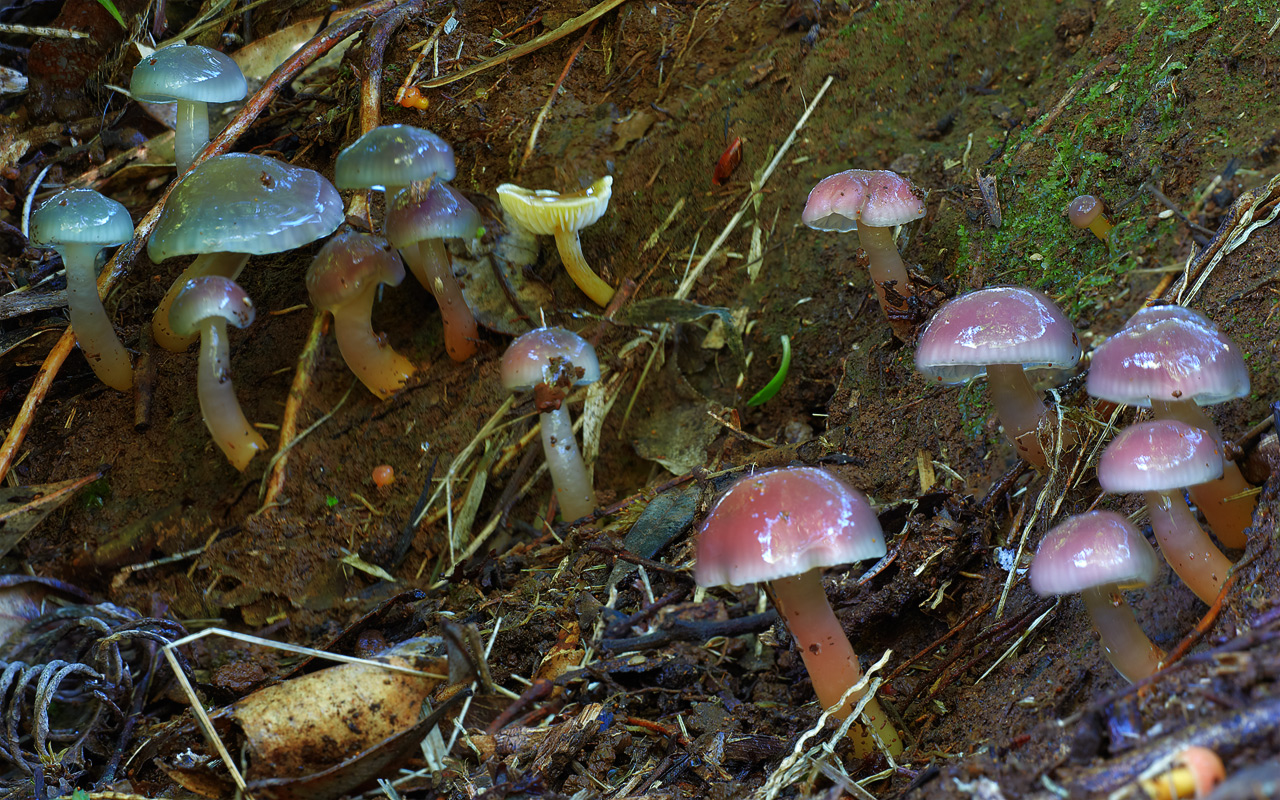
- Gliophorus graminicolor

Scientific classification
- Kingdom: Fungi
- Division: Basidiomycota
- Class: Agaricomycetes
- Order: Agaricales
- Family: Hygrophoraceae
- Genus: Gliophorus; Herink (1958)

Type species
- Gliophorus psittacinus (Schaeff.) Herink (1958)

= Gliophorus =

Genus of fungi

Gliophorus is a genus of agaric fungi in the family Hygrophoraceae. Gliophorus species belong to a group known as waxcaps in English, sometimes also waxy caps in North America or waxgills in New Zealand. In Europe, Gliophorus species are typical of waxcap grasslands, a declining habitat due to changing agricultural practices. As a result, two species, Gliophorus europerplexus and Gliophorus reginae, are of global conservation concern and are listed as "vulnerable" on the IUCN Red List of Threatened Species.

== Taxonomy ==
The genus was described by Czech mycologist Josef Herink in 1958. It was formerly synonymized with Hygrocybe by many authorities, but recent molecular research, based on cladistic analysis of DNA sequences, indicates that Gliophorus is monophyletic and forms a natural group distinct from Hygrocybe sensu stricto.

== Description ==
Species are distinguished from most other waxcaps by producing basidiocarps (fruit bodies) with extremely slimy or glutinous caps and stems. The waxcap genus Gloioxanthomyces is superficially similar.

== Habitat and distribution ==
In Europe, Gliophorus species are typically found in agriculturally unimproved, short-sward grasslands (including pastures and lawns). Elsewhere, they are most frequently found in woodland. The genus is cosmopolitan, though New Zealand has an unusually large number of native Gliophorus species.

== Species ==
Image	Scientific name	Distribution
	G. alboviscidus	Europe
	G. bichromus	New Zealand
	G. calunus	North America
	G. chromolimoneus	New Zealand and Australia
	G. europerplexus	Wales, England, and Spain
	G. fumosogriseus	New Zealand
	G. fumosus	North America
	G. glutinosus	Sikkim
	G. graminicolor	Australia and New Zealand
	G. irrigatus	Europe
	G. laetus	Europe, Central America, eastern and western North America
	G. lilacinoides	New Zealand
	G. lilacipes	New Zealand
	G. luteoglutinosus	Australia
	G. ostrinus	Mexico
	G. pallidus	New Zealand
	G. parafumosus	North America
	G. perplexus	Mexico
	G. pseudograminicolor	Australia
	G. psittacinus	Europe, United Kingdom, Iceland, Greenland, the Americas, South Africa, Japan
	G. reginae	England and Wales, Denmark, France, Slovakia, and Spain.
	G. roseus	Panama
	G. subaromaticus	North America
	G. subheteromorphus	New Zealand
	G. sulfureus	New Zealand
	G. versicolor	New Zealand
	G. viridis	New Zealand
	G. viscaurantius	New Zealand.
