= Phaeocollybia amygdalospora =

Scientific classification
- Domain: Eukaryota
- Kingdom: Fungi
- Division: Basidiomycota
- Class: Agaricomycetes
- Order: Agaricales
- Family: Cortinariaceae
- Genus: Phaeocollybia
- Species: P. amygdalospora

Binomial name
- Phaeocollybia amygdalospora Bandala & E.Horak (1996)

Species of fungus

Phaeocollybia amygdalospora is a species of fungus in the family Cortinariaceae. Found in Durango, Mexico, where it grows under pine, it was described as new to science in 1996 by mycologists Victor Bandala and Egon Horak. It has amygdaliform (almond-shaped) spores (for which it is named) that measure 6.5–9 by 4–5 μm.
