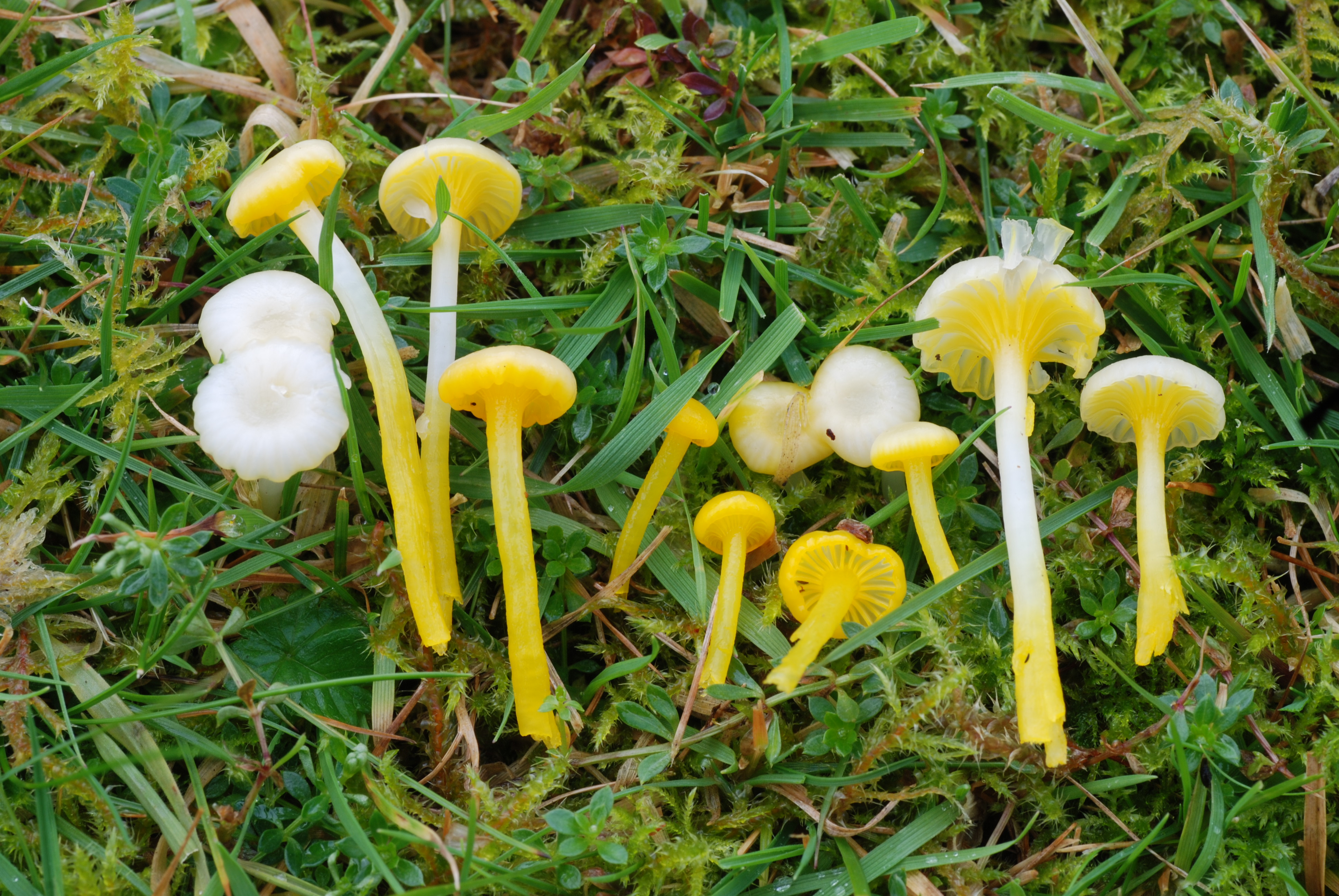
- Gloioxanthomyces vitellinus, Norway

Conservation status
- Endangered (IUCN 3.1)

Scientific classification
- Kingdom: Fungi
- Division: Basidiomycota
- Class: Agaricomycetes
- Order: Agaricales
- Family: Hygrophoraceae
- Genus: Gloioxanthomyces
- Species: G. vitellinus

Binomial name
- Gloioxanthomyces vitellinus (Fr.) Lodge, Vizzini, Ercole & Boertm. (2013)

Synonyms
- Hygrophorus vitellinus Fr. (1863); Hygrocybe vitellina (Fr.) P.Karst. (1879); Hygrocybe luteolaeta Arnolds (1985); Gliophorus luteolaetus (Arnolds) Kovalenko (1988); Gliophorus vitellinus (Fr.) Kovalenko (1988); Hygrocybe laeta var. luteolaeta (Arnolds) Bon (1989)

= Gloioxanthomyces vitellinus =

Glistening Waxcap

Species of fungus

Gloioxanthomyces vitellinus is a species of agaric (gilled mushroom) in the family Hygrophoraceae. It has been given the recommended English name of glistening waxcap. The species has a European distribution, occurring mainly in agriculturally unimproved grassland. Threats to its habitat have resulted in the glistening waxcap being assessed as globally "endangered" on the IUCN Red List of Threatened Species.

== Taxonomy ==
The species was first described by Swedish mycologist Elias Magnus Fries in 1863 as Hygrophorus vitellinus. Finnish mycologist Petter Adolf Karsten transferred it to the genus Hygrocybe in 1879. Recent molecular research, based on cladistic analysis of DNA sequences, has shown that the species is not closely related to the type of Hygrocybe, but belongs in the related genus Gloioxanthomyces.

== Description ==
Basidiocarps are agaricoid, up to 5 centimetres (2 in), the cap hemispherical, up to 2 cm (3/4 in)across. The cap surface is distinctly viscid, bright chrome-yellow at first becoming paler. The lamellae (gills) are chrome-yellow with a viscid edge. The stipe (stem) is smooth, viscid, chrome-yellow, lacking a ring. The spore print is white, the spores (under a microscope) ellipsoid, inamyloid, measuring about 7 to 8 by 5.5 to 7 μm.

=== Similar species ===
Gloioxanthomyces nitidus is the North American equivalent of G. vitellinus. In Europe, Hygrocybe ceracea is similarly coloured but is never viscid. Chromosera citrinopallida is also similar, but is a species of alpine and montane habitats.

== Distribution and habitat ==
The glistening waxcap is rare but widespread in Europe. Like many other European waxcaps, it occurs in old, agriculturally unimproved, short-sward grassland (pastures and lawns).

== Conservation ==
Gloioxanthomyces vitellinus is typical of waxcap grasslands, a declining habitat due to changing agricultural practices. As a result, the species is of global conservation concern and is listed as "endangered" on the IUCN Red List of Threatened Species.
