= Phaeocollybia benzokauffmanii =

Scientific classification
- Kingdom: Fungi
- Division: Basidiomycota
- Class: Agaricomycetes
- Order: Agaricales
- Family: Cortinariaceae
- Genus: Phaeocollybia
- Species: P. benzokauffmanii

Binomial name
- Phaeocollybia benzokauffmanii Norvell

Species of fungus

Phaeocollybia benzokauffmanii
- Mycological characteristics
- Gills on hymenium
- Cap is conical or umbonate
- Hymenium is adnexed or free
- Stipe is bare
- Spore print is yellow-brown
- Ecology is mycorrhizal
- Edibility is unknown

Phaeocollybia benzokauffmanii, commonly known as the smoky phaeo, is a species of mushroom in the genus Phaeocollybia. It is found in conifer forests, and is endemic to the Pacific Northwest.

== Description ==
The cap of Phaeocollybia benzokauffmanii is about 5-15 centimeters in diameter. It starts out conical, and expands to convex or flat with an umbo. It is slimy when wet. It is often a mix of brownish, purplish, and pinkish tones, and becomes darker brown in age. The gills can be adnexed or free. They are grayish in color, but can be more white or pinkish when young. The stipe is about 25 centimeters long, with the top 3.5-10 centimeters visible aboveground. It is about 0.7-3 centimeters wide, and tapers at the base. The spore print is yellowish brown.

=== Similar species ===
Phaeocollybia spadicea is similar to P. benzokauffmanii, but has darker colored gills and is smaller. P. oregonensis is also similar, but its stipe is pinkish at the top and its cap is grayish or grayish brown. P. redheadii is also similar, but has bigger spores and a dark or reddish brown-colored cap. P. kauffmanii is also similar to P. benzokauffmanii, but has an orangish or yellowish brown cap. The cap of P. benzokauffmanii also has less inrolled cap margins than P. kauffmanii. Both P. benzokauffmanii and P. kauffmanii are large mushrooms. However, P. benzokauffmanii tends to be larger in California, while north of there P. kauffmanii is larger.

== Habitat and ecology ==
Phaeocollybia benzokauffmanii is found in coniferous forests in the Pacific Northwest. It is mycorrhizal.
