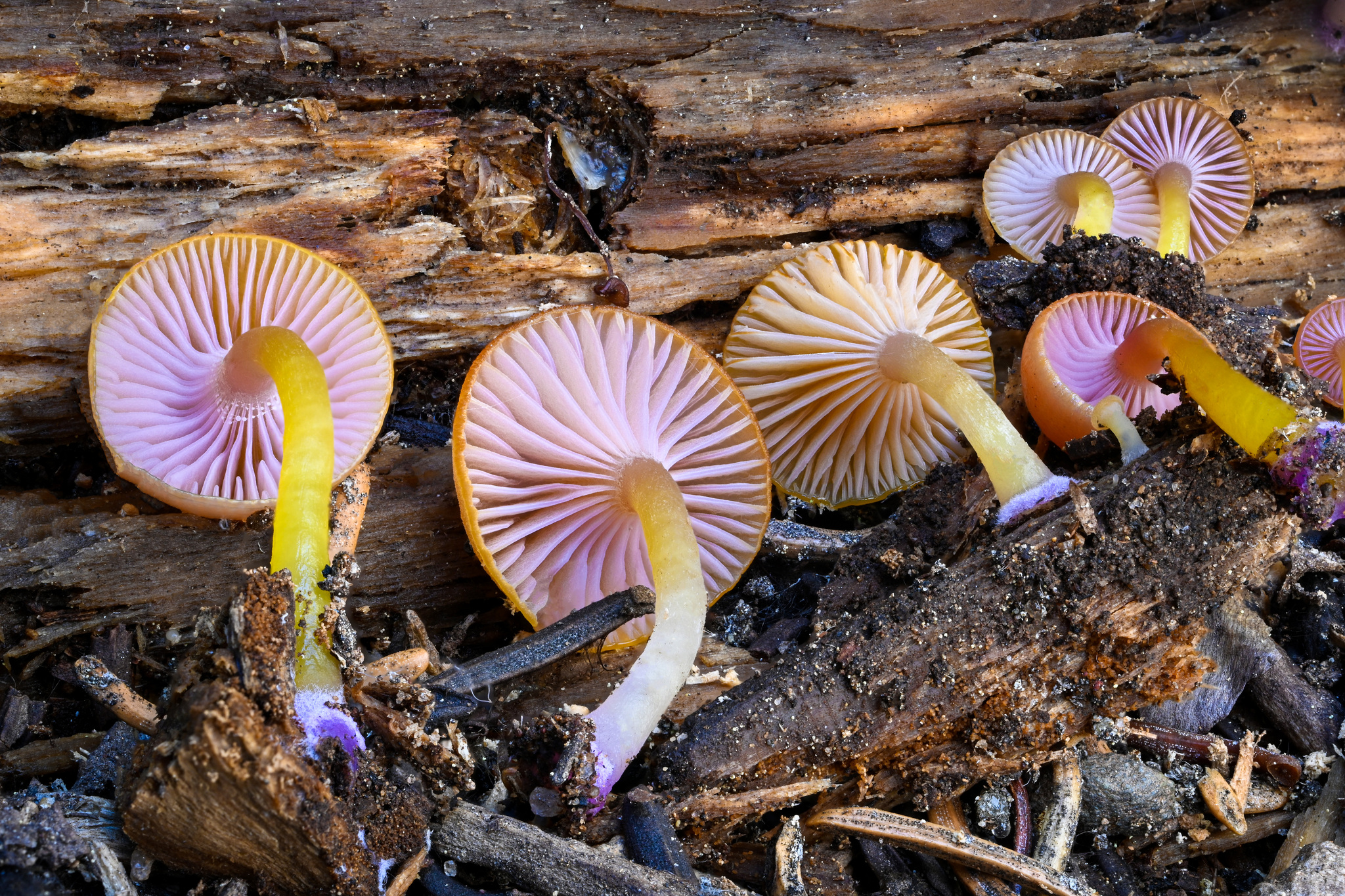

Scientific classification
- Kingdom: Fungi
- Division: Basidiomycota
- Class: Agaricomycetes
- Order: Agaricales
- Family: Hygrophoraceae
- Genus: Chromosera
- Species: C. loreleiae

Binomial name
- Chromosera loreleiae Lodge, Redhead, & Mullineux, 2025

= Chromosera loreleiae =

Species of fungus

Chromosera loreleiae is a delicate multihued yellow-pink-lilac species of mushroom. Chromosera loreleia was newly described in 2025 as a western North American species. Western North American specimens had previously been assigned to Chromosera cyanophylla, before DNA studies found them to be genetically distinct. Chromosera lorelaiae, Chromosera cyanophylla, and Chromosera lilacifolia "form a strongly supported clade." The specific name honors Lorelei L. Norvell, an American mycologist who codescribed the genus Chromosera. Norvell died in 2023. Chromosera loreleia typically associates with conifer trees.
