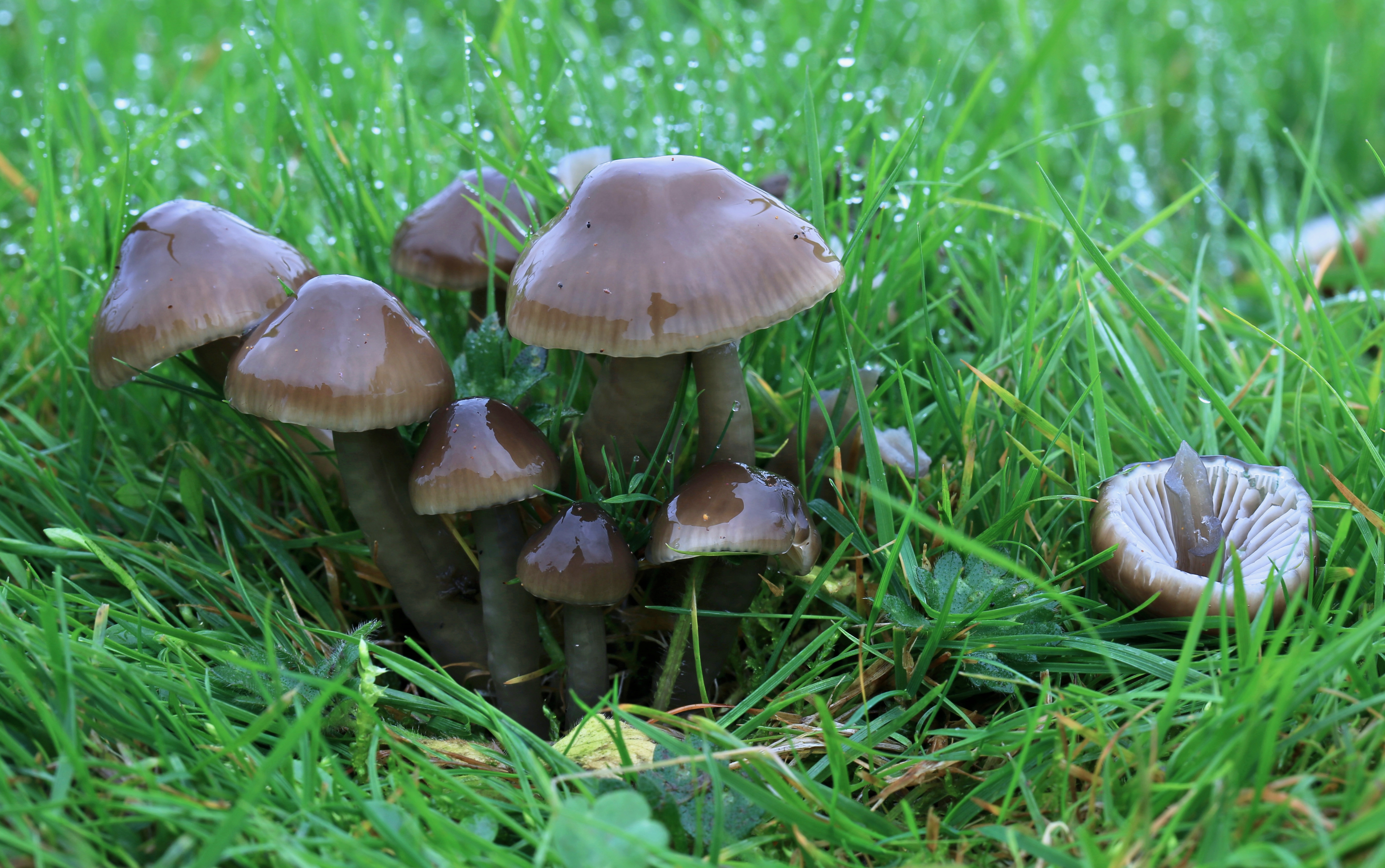

Scientific classification
- Kingdom: Fungi
- Division: Basidiomycota
- Class: Agaricomycetes
- Order: Agaricales
- Family: Hygrophoraceae
- Genus: Gliophorus
- Species: G. irrigatus

Binomial name
- Gliophorus irrigatus (Pers.) A.M. Ainsw. & P.M. Kirk (2013)

Synonyms
- Agaricus irrigatus Pers. (1801); Hygrophorus irrigatus (Pers.) Fr. (1838); Camarophyllus irrigatus (Pers.) P. Kumm. (1871); Agaricus unguinosus Fr. (1821); Hygrocybe unguinosa (Fr.) P. Karst. (1879); Hygrophorus unguinosus (Fr.) Fr. (1838); Hygrocybe irrigatus (Pers.) Bon (1976)

= Gliophorus irrigatus =

Species of fungus

Gliophorus irrigatus is a species of agaric (gilled mushroom) in the family Hygrophoraceae. It has been given the recommended English name of slimy waxcap. The species is widespread in Europe, typically in grassland. Similar but distinct species occur in North America and elsewhere.

== Taxonomy ==
The species was first described in 1801 by the South African-born mycologist Christiaan Hendrik Persoon as Agaricus irrigatus. It was subsequently combined in a number of different genera, before being transferred to Hygrocybe in 1976. The specific epithet comes from Latin "irrigatus" (= watered or bedewed), with reference to the viscid coating of the fruit bodies.

Molecular research published in 2011, based on cladistic analysis of DNA sequences, showed that Hygrocybe irrigata did not belong in Hygrocybe sensu stricto and it was moved to the genus Gliophorus in 2013.

== Description ==
Basidiocarps are agaricoid, up to 100 mm (4 in) tall, the cap convex at first and remaining convex or becoming flat when expanded, up to 50 mm (2 in) across. The cap surface is very viscid when damp, striate at the margin, and pale greyish brown. The lamellae (gills) are whitish to pale cap-coloured and more or less decurrent (widely attached to and running down the stipe). The stipe (stem) is very viscid when damp, smooth, cylindrical or compressed, and grey to cap-coloured. The spore print is white, the spores (under a microscope) smooth, inamyloid, ellipsoid, about 6.5 to 8.0 by 4.5 to 5.0 μm.

The recently described Gliophorus alboviscidus is similar, but is entirely pallid to white.

== Distribution and habitat ==
The slimy waxcap is distributed in Europe and the Caucasus, as far east as Georgia. It was formerly believed to occur in North America, but DNA sequencing has shown that American records refer to several similar species, including Gliophorus fumosus and G. parafumosus in eastern North America and G. calunus and G. subaromaticus in the west.

Like most other European waxcaps, Gliophorus irrigatus grows in old, unimproved, short-sward grassland (pastures and lawns). Recent research suggests waxcaps are neither mycorrhizal nor saprotrophic but may be associated with mosses.

== Conservation ==
Gliophorus irrigatus is typical of waxcap grasslands, a declining habitat due to changing agricultural practices. The slimy waxcap is one of the commoner species, however, only appearing on the red lists of threatened fungi in a few countries, including the Czech Republic, Germany (Bavaria), and Poland.
