= Gliophorus pseudograminicolor =

Scientific classification
- Kingdom: Fungi
- Division: Basidiomycota
- Class: Agaricomycetes
- Order: Agaricales
- Family: Hygrophoraceae
- Genus: Gliophorus
- Species: G. pseudograminicolor

Binomial name
- Gliophorus pseudograminicolor (A.M.Young) P.M.Kirk (2013)

Synonyms
- Hygrocybe pseudograminicolor A.M.Young (1997)

Species of fungus

Gliophorus pseudograminicolor is a species of agaric fungus in the family Hygrophoraceae. Found in Australia, it was originally described in 1997 by mycologist Anthony M. Young as a species of Hygrocybe and transferred to Gliophorus in 2013.
