= Phaeocollybia scatesiae =

Scientific classification
- Kingdom: Fungi
- Division: Basidiomycota
- Class: Agaricomycetes
- Order: Agaricales
- Family: Cortinariaceae
- Genus: Phaeocollybia
- Species: P. scatesiae

Binomial name
- Phaeocollybia scatesiae A.H. Sm. & Trappe

Species of fungus

Phaeocollybia scatesiae Mycological characteristics
- Gills on hymenium
- Cap is conical or campanulate
- Hymenium is adnexed
- Stipe is bare
- Spore print is yellow-brown
- Ecology is mycorrhizal
- Edibility is unknown

Phaeocollybia scatesiae, commonly known as Kit's phaeo, is a species of mushroom in the genus Phaeocollybia. It is endemic to the Pacific Northwest, and grows in clusters.

== Description ==
The cap of Phaeocollybia scatesiae is can be conical or campanulate and is brownish in color. It is about 2-6 centimeters in diameter, and covered in a thick layer of slime. The stipe can be up to 25 centimeters long, but only about 4-7 centimeters of it are visible aboveground. It is about 0.4-1.2 centimeters wide at the top, and tapers underground. Underground, it is fused to the stipes of the other mushrooms in the cluster. The gills start out buff, becoming brown or yellowish brown, and eventually a dingy yellowish brown color as the mushroom gets older. They are adnexed. The spore print is yellowish brown.

== Habitat and ecology ==
Phaeocollybia attenuata is found in coniferous forests both near the coast and in the mountains. It is a mycorrhizal fungus, and fruits in late autumn.
