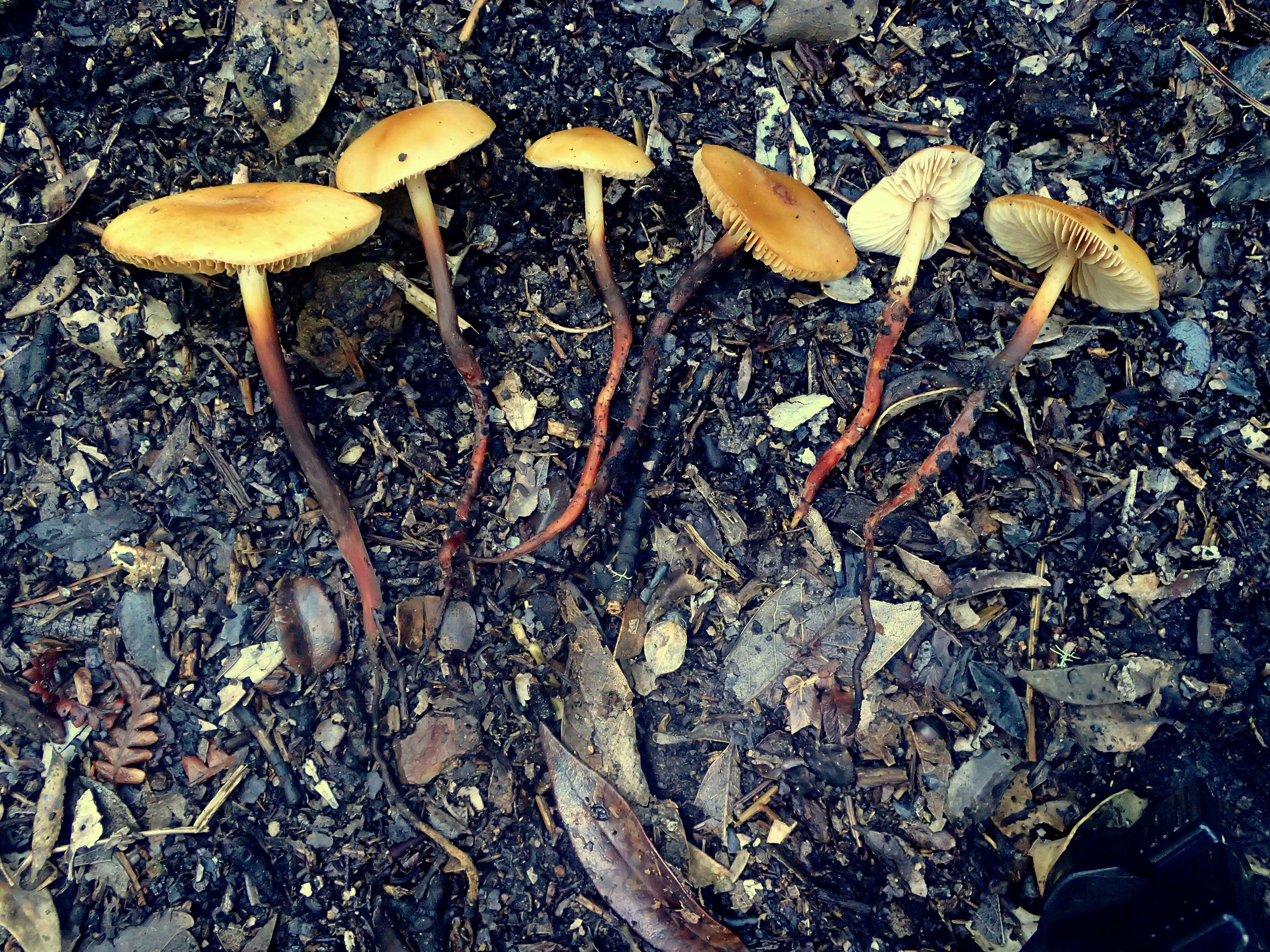

Scientific classification
- Kingdom: Fungi
- Division: Basidiomycota
- Class: Agaricomycetes
- Order: Agaricales
- Family: Cortinariaceae
- Genus: Phaeocollybia
- Species: P. attenuata

Binomial name
- Phaeocollybia attenuata (A.H. Sm.) Singer

= Phaeocollybia attenuata =

Species of fungus

Phaeocollybia attenuata Mycological characteristics
- Gills on hymenium
- Cap is conical
- Hymenium is adnexed
- Stipe is bare
- Spore print is reddish-brown
- Ecology is mycorrhizal
- Edibility is unknown

Phaeocollybia attenuata, commonly known as the little phaeo, is a species of mushroom in the genus Phaeocollybia. It is found in mixed conifer forests and is endemic to the Pacific Northwest.

== Description ==
The cap of Phaeocollybia attenuata is brownish in color, and is between 1 and 5 centimeters in diameter. It starts out conical, and becomes convex or campanulate as the mushroom gets older. The stipe is more than 20 centimeters long, but only about 2-6 centimeters of it are visible aboveground. It is about 2-5 millimeters wide. It is brownish, and darkens from the bottom up in age. The gills start out buff, and become brownish with age. The spore print is reddish brown. There are several other species in the same genus that are small and similarly colored, such as P. pleurocystidiata, P. radicata, P. phaeogaleroides, and P. californica.

== Habitat and ecology ==
Phaeocollybia attenuata is found in mixed and coniferous forests. It is mycorrhizal, and is most commonly reported from forests near the Oregon coast. It is often found with spruce.
