= Phaeocollybia olivacea =

Scientific classification
- Kingdom: Fungi
- Division: Basidiomycota
- Class: Agaricomycetes
- Order: Agaricales
- Family: Cortinariaceae
- Genus: Phaeocollybia
- Species: P. olivacea

Binomial name
- Phaeocollybia olivacea A.H. Sm.

Species of fungus

Phaeocollybia olivacea Mycological characteristics
- Gills on hymenium
- Cap is conical or umbonate
- Hymenium is free
- Stipe is bare
- Spore print is reddish-brown to yellow-brown
- Ecology is mycorrhizal
- Edibility is unknown

Phaeocollybia olivacea, commonly known as the olive phaeocollybia, is a species of mushroom in the genus Phaeocollybia. It is found in the Pacific Northwest.

== Description ==
The cap of Phaeocollybia olivacea starts out dark green, before becoming brownish, orangish, or reddish olive green. It is slimy when wet. It is about 3.5-10 centimeters in diameter. It starts out conical, before sometimes becoming convex with an umbo. The gills start out pale yellowish, before becoming olive or dull golden colored. The stipe can be up to 22 centimeters long, but most of it is hidden underground, with only 7-14 centimeters visible aboveground. The stipe is between 8 millimeters and 2 centimeters wide, and tapers underground. The spore print is brownish.

== Habitat and ecology ==
Phaeocollybia olivacea is found in mixed and coniferous forests, where it grows in clusters. It is mycorrhizal, and sometimes grows in fairy rings.
