= Phaeocollybia moseri =

Scientific classification
- Domain: Eukaryota
- Kingdom: Fungi
- Division: Basidiomycota
- Class: Agaricomycetes
- Order: Agaricales
- Family: Cortinariaceae
- Genus: Phaeocollybia
- Species: P. moseri

Binomial name
- Phaeocollybia moseri Bandala & Guzmán (1996)

Species of fungus

Phaeocollybia moseri is a species of fungus in the family Cortinariaceae. Found in Chiapas, Mexico, where it grows under pine, it was described as new to science in 1996 by Victor Bandala and Gastón Guzmán. It belongs to the section Versicolores of the genus Phaeocollybia. The specific epithet moseri honors Dutch mycologist Meinhard Moser, "on the occasion of his 70th anniversary and for his contribution to agaric systematics".
