= Phaeocollybia herrerae =

Scientific classification
- Domain: Eukaryota
- Kingdom: Fungi
- Division: Basidiomycota
- Class: Agaricomycetes
- Order: Agaricales
- Family: Cortinariaceae
- Genus: Phaeocollybia
- Species: P. herrerae

Binomial name
- Phaeocollybia herrerae Bandala & Montoya (1996)

Species of fungus

Phaeocollybia herrerae is a species of fungus in the family Cortinariaceae. Found in Morelos, Mexico, where it grows in subtropical (mesophytic) forest with oak and in pine-oak forest, it was described as new to science in 1996 by mycologists Victor Bandala and Leticia Montoya. It is in the section Microsporae of genus Phaeocollybia. Its roughly ellipsoid to somewhat egg-shaped spores measure 5–5.5 by 2.5–3 μm. The specific epithet herrerae honors Teófilo Herrera Suárez, "because of his prominent contribution to Mexican mycology 50 year ago".
