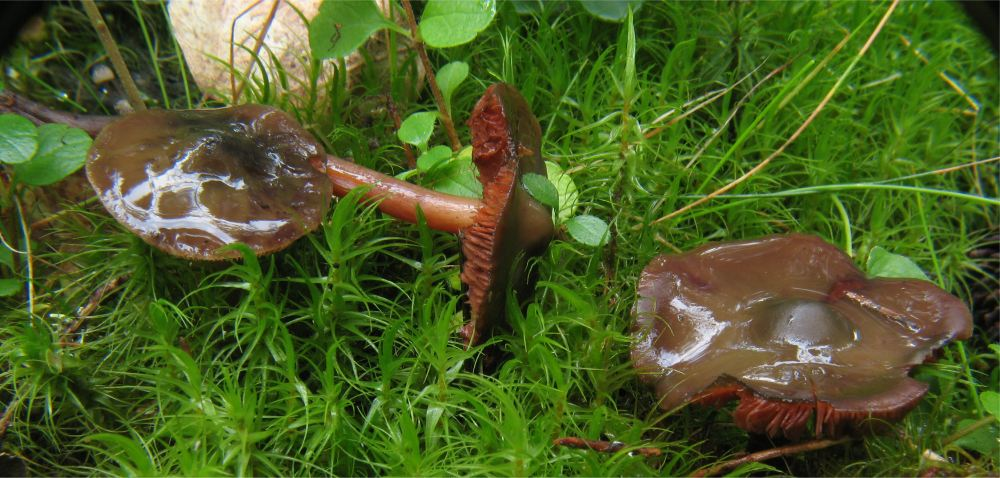

Scientific classification
- Domain: Eukaryota
- Kingdom: Fungi
- Division: Basidiomycota
- Class: Agaricomycetes
- Order: Agaricales
- Family: Cortinariaceae
- Genus: Phaeocollybia
- Species: P. festiva

Binomial name
- Phaeocollybia festiva (Fr.) R.Heim, 1942

Synonyms
- Agaricus festivus Fr.; Hylophila festiva (Fr.) Quél., 1886; Naucoria festiva (Fr.) Bres.; Simocybe festiva (Fr.) P.Karst.

= Phaeocollybia festiva =

Species of fungus

Phaeocollybia festiva is a species of fungus in the family Cortinariaceae.
