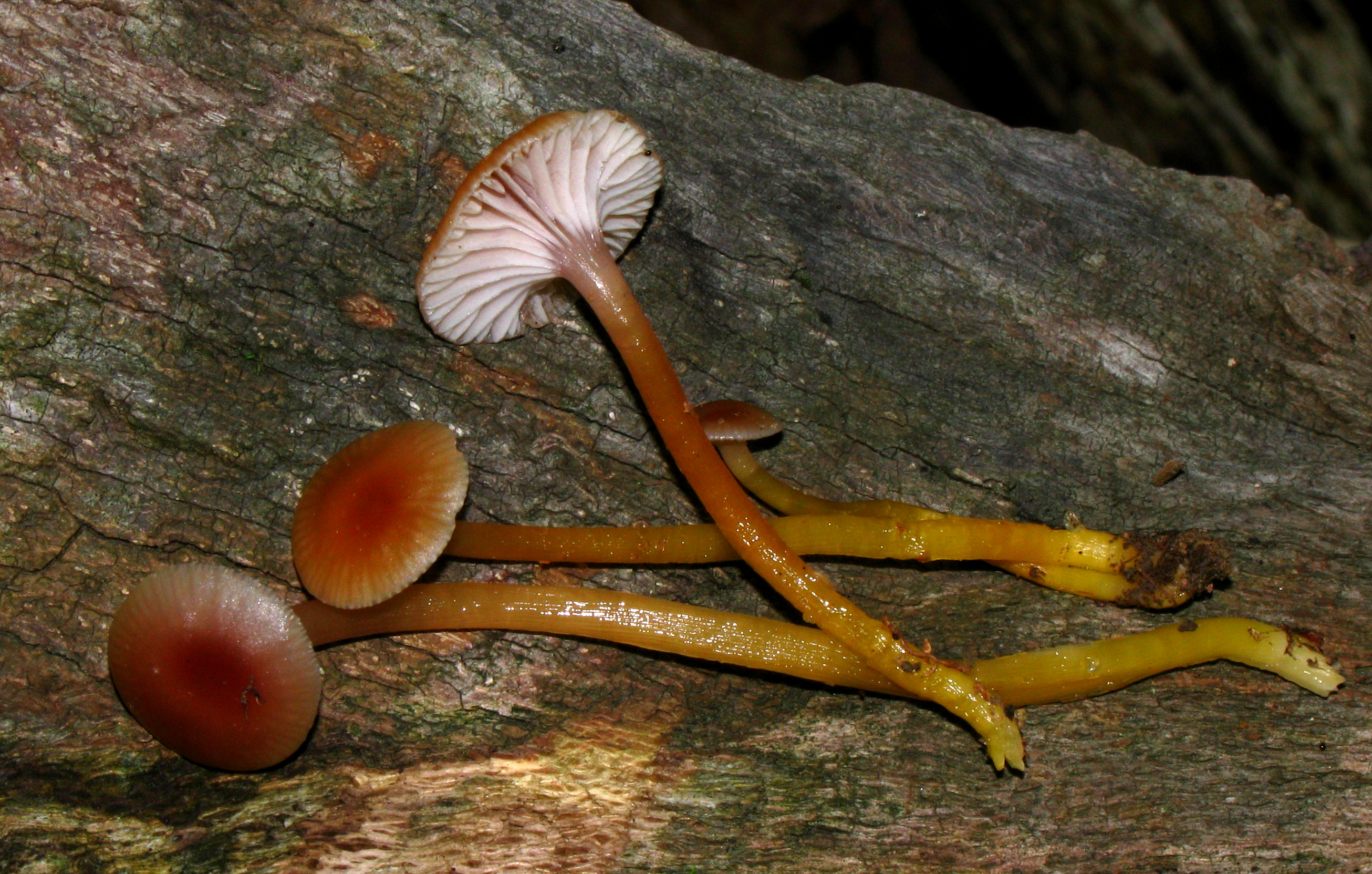

Scientific classification
- Domain: Eukaryota
- Kingdom: Fungi
- Division: Basidiomycota
- Class: Agaricomycetes
- Order: Agaricales
- Family: Hygrophoraceae
- Genus: Gliophorus
- Species: G. laetus

Binomial name
- Gliophorus laetus (Pers.) Herink (1958)

Synonyms
- Agaricus laetus Pers. (1800); Hygrophorus laetus (Pers.) Fr. (1838); Hygrocybe laeta (Pers.) P.Kumm. (1871); Hygrophorus houghtonii Berk. & Broome [as 'houghtoni'] (1873); Hygrophorus laetus f. hougthonii (Berk. & Broome) Quél. (1880); Hygrocybe laeta f. curtipes F.H.Møller (1945); Hygrophorus laetus f. pallidus A.H.Sm. (1953); Hygrocybe laeta f. pallida (A.H.Sm.) Bon (1976); Gliophorus laetus f. pallidus (A.H.Sm.) Kovalenko (1988); Gliophorus laetus f. laetus (Pers.) Herink (1958); Hygrocybe laeta f. griseopallida Bon (1976); Hygrocybe laeta f. pseudopsittacina Bon (1976); Hygrocybe laeta var. flava Boertm. (1995)

= Gliophorus laetus =

Species of fungus

Gliophorus laetus is a species of agaric fungus in the family Hygrophoraceae. Originally described as new to science by Christian Hendrik Persoon in 1800, it was transferred to the genus Gliophorus in 1958.

The orangish cap is convex-to-flat, slimy, and 1–3 centimetres (1/2–1 1/4 in) wide. The stem is 2.5–8.5 cm (1–3 1/4 in) long. The flesh is whitish. The spore print is white. It can resemble G. perplexus.

It can be found on moist ground in North America. It is considered edible, but of little interest.
