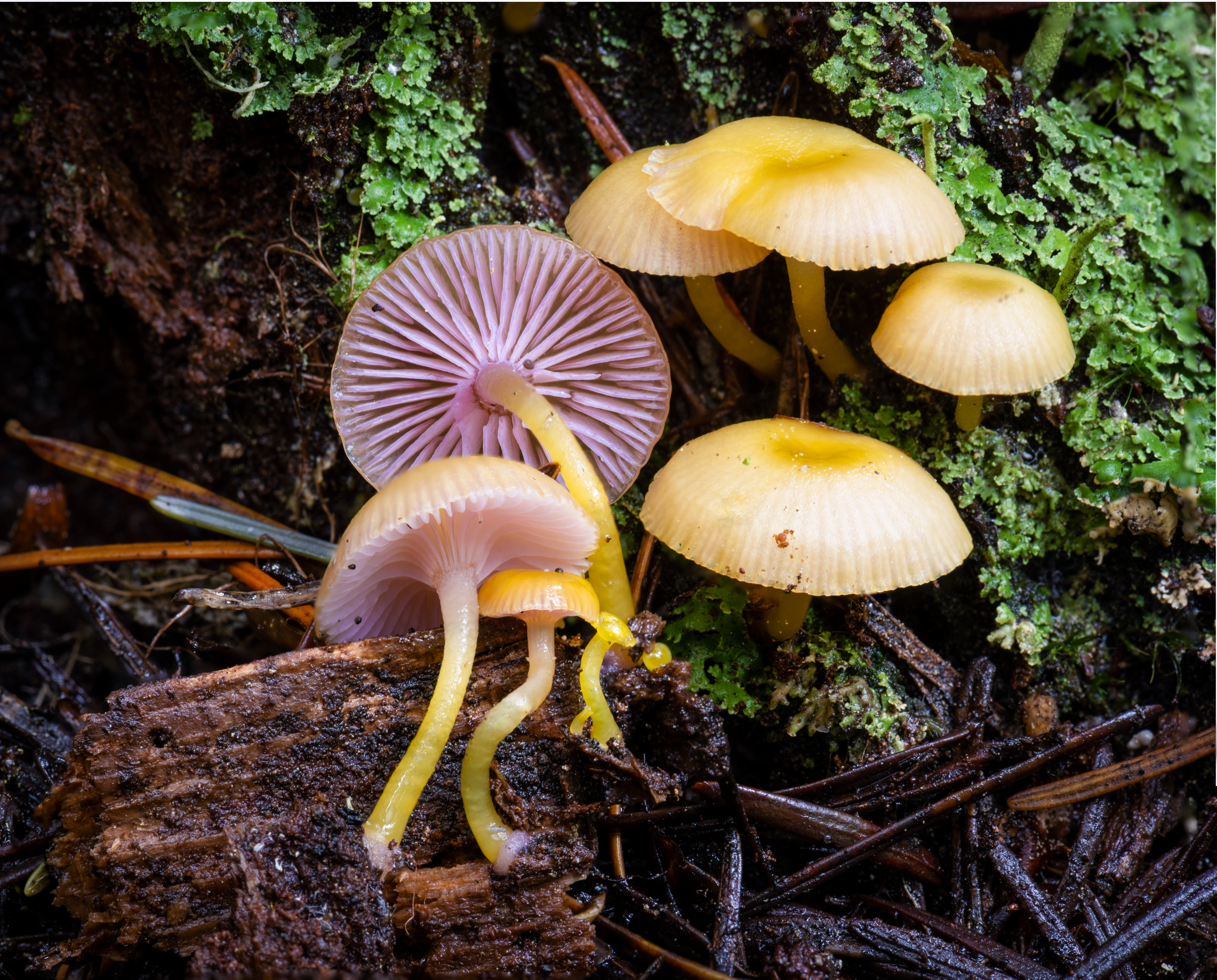
- Chromosera loreleiae

Scientific classification
- Kingdom: Fungi
- Division: Basidiomycota
- Class: Agaricomycetes
- Order: Agaricales
- Family: Hygrophoraceae
- Genus: Chromosera; Redhead, Ammirati & Norvell (1995)

Type species
- Chromosera cyanophylla (Fr.) Redhead, Ammirati & Norvell (2011)

Species
- Chromosera ambigua Chromosera citrinopallida Chromosera cyanophylla Chromosera lilacina Chromosera lilacifolia Chromosera loreleiae Chromosera viola Chromosera xanthochroa

= Chromosera =

Genus of fungi

Chromosera is a genus of fungi in the family Hygrophoraceae. Within the family Hygrophoraceae it is closely related to the genus Gloioxanthomyces. It contains eight brightly colored species showing yellow and/or bluish to violet coloration. Three species are lignicolous, growing on decaying conifer wood. Other species grow on rich organic soil or peat. At least one species can be cultured and displays characteristic yellow and violet pigments in its mycelium. The generic name honors the mycologist Meinhard Moser, and also alludes (chromos) to the distinct coloration of the mushrooms, by overlapping 'chromos' with 'Moser', hence Chromosera.

== See also ==
- List of Agaricales genera
