= Phaeocollybia fallax =

Scientific classification
- Kingdom: Fungi
- Division: Basidiomycota
- Class: Agaricomycetes
- Order: Agaricales
- Family: Cortinariaceae
- Genus: Phaeocollybia
- Species: P. fallax

Binomial name
- Phaeocollybia fallax A.H. Sm.

Species of fungus

Phaeocollybia fallax Mycological characteristics
- Gills on hymenium
- Cap is conical or umbonate
- Hymenium is adnexed or free
- Stipe is bare
- Spore print is pinkish-brown to reddish-brown
- Ecology is mycorrhizal
- Edibility is unknown

Phaeocollybia fallax, commonly known as the beautiful phaeo or pretty phaeocollybia, is a species of mushroom in the genus Phaeocollybia. It is found in Western North America.

== Description ==
The cap of Phaeocollybia fallax is green, sometimes becoming brown in age. It is slimy when wet. It is about 1.5-6 centimeters in diameter. It starts out conical, becoming convex, flat, or umbonate. The gills start out purple, and become brown in age. The stipe can be up to 25 centimeters long, but most of it is hidden underground, with only about 4-8 centimeters visible aboveground. The stipe is between 3 millimeters and 1 centimeter wide. The spore print is brownish.

== Habitat and ecology ==
Phaeocollybia fallax is often found in old growth forests. It is a mycorrhizal fungus, forming symbiotic relationships with conifer trees. It may also grow with tanoak. It can be found in coastal forests. While it usually fruits during fall, it occasionally does so in spring.
