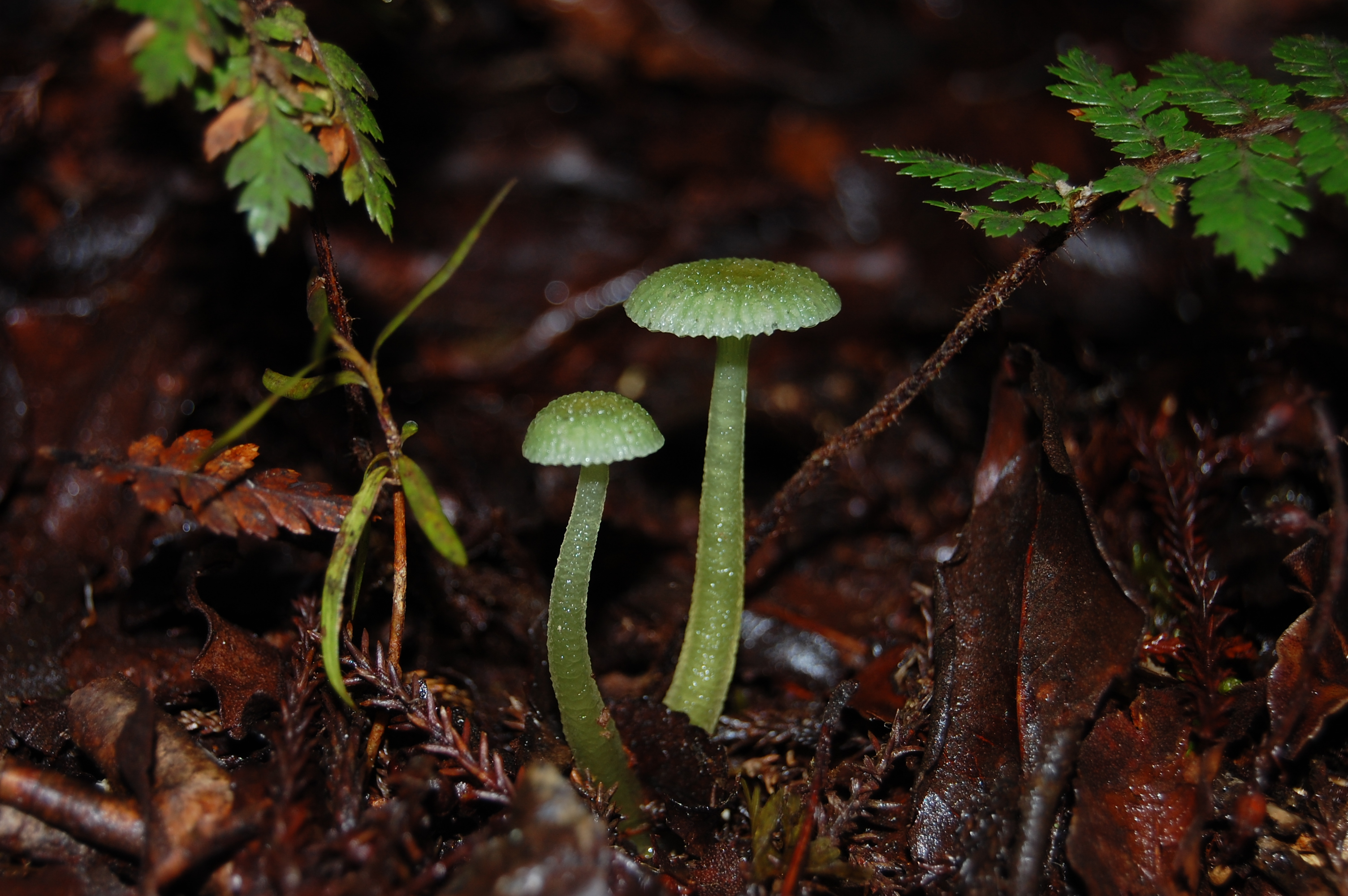

Scientific classification
- Domain: Eukaryota
- Kingdom: Fungi
- Division: Basidiomycota
- Class: Agaricomycetes
- Order: Agaricales
- Family: Hygrophoraceae
- Genus: Gliophorus
- Species: G. graminicolor

Binomial name
- Gliophorus graminicolor E.Horak (1973)

Synonyms
- Hygrocybe graminicolor (E.Horak) T.W.May & A.E.Wood (1995)

= Gliophorus graminicolor =

Species of fungus

Gliophorus graminicolor is a species of agaric fungus in the family Hygrophoraceae. It is found in Australia and New Zealand. In 1995, Australian mycologists Tom May and Alec Wood transferred the species to Hygrocybe, but the taxonomic authority Index Fungorum retains it in Gliophorus.
