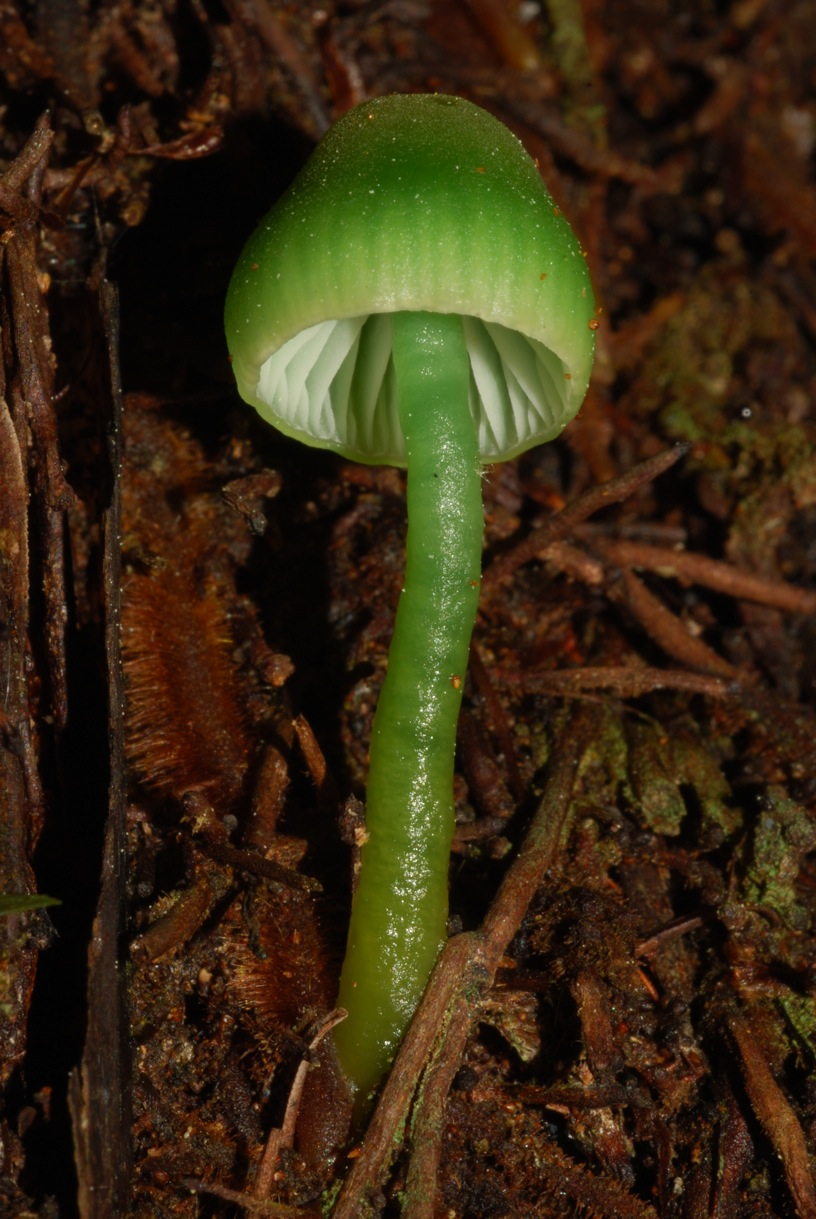

Scientific classification
- Domain: Eukaryota
- Kingdom: Fungi
- Division: Basidiomycota
- Class: Agaricomycetes
- Order: Agaricales
- Family: Hygrophoraceae
- Genus: Gliophorus
- Species: G. viridis

Binomial name
- Gliophorus viridis E.Horak (1973)

Synonyms
- Hygrophorus viridis G. Stev., Kew Bulletin 16 (3): 383 (1963); Gliophorus viridis (G. Stev.) E. Horak, New Zealand Journal of Botany 9 (3): 462 (1971); Hygrocybe viridis (G. Stev.) A.M. Young, Common Australian fungi. A naturalist's guide: 80 (1994); Hygrocybe stevensoniae T.W. May & A.E. Wood, Mycotaxon 54: 148 (1995)

= Gliophorus viridis =

Species of fungus

Mycological characteristics
- Gills on hymenium
- Cap is conical
- Hymenium is adnate
- Stipe is bare
- Ecology is mycorrhizal
- Edibility is inedible

Gliophorus viridis is a species of agaric fungus in the family Hygrophoraceae found in New Zealand and Australia.
