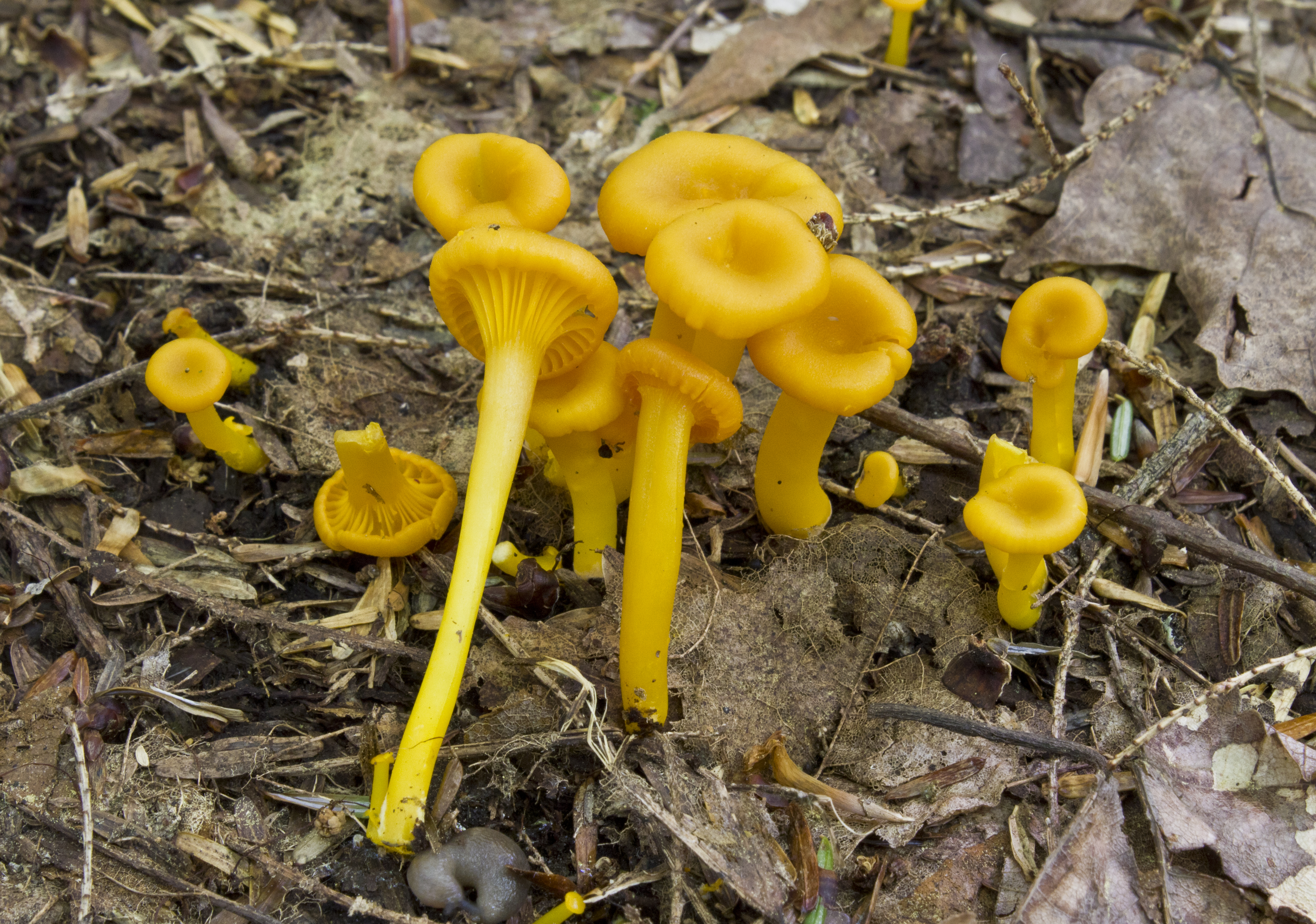
- Gloioxanthomyces nitidus

Scientific classification
- Kingdom: Fungi
- Division: Basidiomycota
- Class: Agaricomycetes
- Order: Agaricales
- Family: Hygrophoraceae
- Genus: Gloioxanthomyces; Lodge, Vizzini, Ercole & Boertm. (2013)

Type species
- Gloioxanthomyces vitellinus (Fr.) Lodge, Vizzini, Ercole & Boertm.(2013)

Species
- Gloioxanthomyces nitidus Gloioxanthomyces vitellinus Gloioxanthomyces chromolimoneus

= Gloioxanthomyces =

Genus of fungi

Gloioxanthomyces is a genus of fungi in the family Hygrophoraceae. It was circumscribed in 2013 to contain G. nitidus, and the type species, G. vitellinus. Within the Hygrophoraceae, it is in the tribe Chromosereae and closely related to the genus Chromosera. The generic name derives from the Greek gloio ("glutinous"), xantho ("yellow"), and myces (fungus).

== See also ==
- List of Agaricales genera
