= Phaeocollybia lilacifolia =

Scientific classification
- Kingdom: Fungi
- Division: Basidiomycota
- Class: Agaricomycetes
- Order: Agaricales
- Family: Cortinariaceae
- Genus: Phaeocollybia
- Species: P. lilacifolia

Binomial name
- Phaeocollybia lilacifolia A.H. Sm.

Species of fungus

Phaeocollybia lilacifolia Mycological characteristics
- Gills on hymenium
- Cap is conical or umbonate
- Hymenium is adnexed or free
- Stipe is bare
- Spore print is brown
- Ecology is mycorrhizal
- Edibility is unknown

Phaeocollybia lilacifolia, commonly known as the lilac-gilled phaeo, is a species of mushroom in the genus Phaeocollybia. It is found in the Pacific Northwest.

== Description ==
The cap of Phaeocollybia lilacifolia is brown, and is 2-6 centimeters in diameter. It starts out conical, before becoming campanulate or convex. It has an umbo. The gills start out purplish in color, and become rusty brown as the mushroom gets older. They are adnexed to free. The stipe can be up to 18 centimeters long, although only about 3-6 centimeters of it are visible aboveground. It is about 0.5-1.5 centimeters wide. It is brown. When young, it is pinkish at the top. The spore print is brownish.

== Habitat and ecology ==
Phaeocollybia lilacifolia is mycorrhizal and grows under conifers. It is mostly found in old growth forests, where it faces habitat loss.
