= Phaeocollybia sipei =

Scientific classification
- Kingdom: Fungi
- Division: Basidiomycota
- Class: Agaricomycetes
- Order: Agaricales
- Family: Cortinariaceae
- Genus: Phaeocollybia
- Species: P. sipei

Binomial name
- Phaeocollybia sipei A.H. Sm.

Species of fungus

Phaeocollybia sipei Mycological characteristics
- Gills on hymenium
- Cap is conical or campanulate
- Hymenium is adnexed or free
- Stipe is bare
- Spore print is brown
- Ecology is mycorrhizal
- Edibility is unknown

Phaeocollybia sipei is a species of mushroom-forming fungus in the genus Phaeocollybia. It is found in the Pacific Northwest.

== Description ==
The cap of Phaeocollybia sipei is orange or orangish brown, and is between 2.5 and 12 centimeters in diameter. It is conical to campanulate, and greasy or slimy when wet. The gills are buff to dark yellowish brown, and can be adnexed or free. The stipe can be up to 40 centimeters long, but only about 4-8 centimeters of it are visible aboveground. It is about 0.5-1.5 centimeters wide. It is buff to orange or brown. The spore print is brown.

== Habitat and ecology ==
Phaeocollybia sipei is found in forests, where it grows under conifer trees. It is mycorrhizal.
