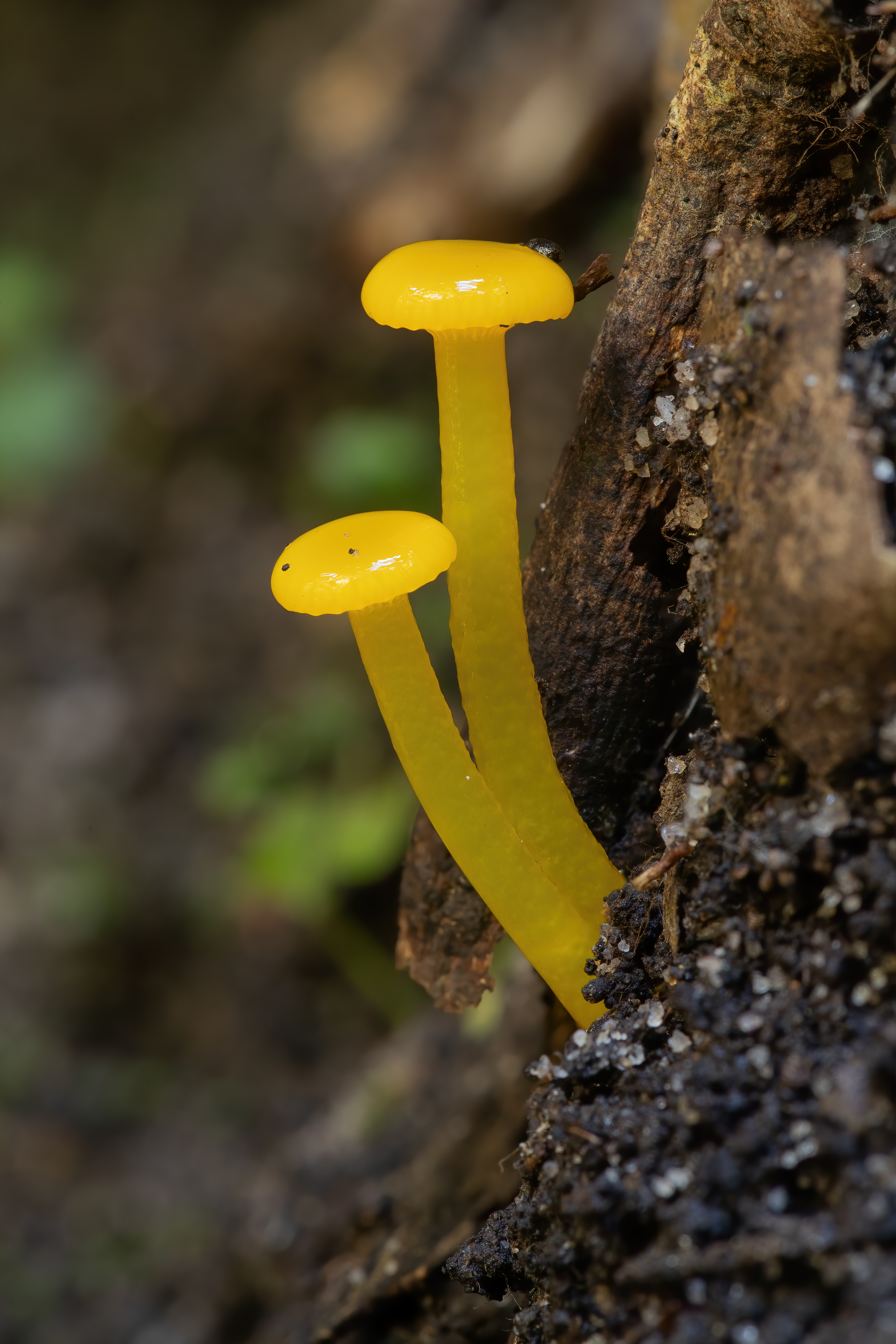

Scientific classification
- Domain: Eukaryota
- Kingdom: Fungi
- Division: Basidiomycota
- Class: Agaricomycetes
- Order: Agaricales
- Family: Hygrophoraceae
- Genus: Gliophorus
- Species: G. chromolimoneus

Binomial name
- Gliophorus chromolimoneus (G. Stev.)E.Horak (1973)

Synonyms
- Hygrophorus chromolimoneus G. Stev., Kew Bulletin 16 (3): 383 (1963); Hygrocybe chromolimonea (G. Stev.) T.W. May & A.E. Wood, Mycotaxon 54: 148 (1995)

= Gliophorus chromolimoneus =

Species of fungus

Gliophorus chromolimoneus is a species of agaric fungus in the family Hygrophoraceae found in New Zealand and Australia.

== Description ==
The cap is 5 to 25 mm (0.2 to 1.0 in) in diameter, hemispherical at first, flattening with age and becoming umbonate. It is glutinous to the touch and has some shade of pale to chrome yellow. The margin is striated, and the texture is membranaceous. The gills are adnate to decurrent and the same colour as the cap at first, but fade with age, and have a gelatinous thread. The stipe is 20 to 40 mm (0.8 to 1.6 in) long, 2 to 4 mm (0.08 to 0.16 in) in diameter, cylindrical, hollow and glutinous throughout its length; the base is orange, but the rest of the stipe is the same colour as the cap. The spores are ellipsoid, smooth and inamyloid, and measure 7–9.5 x 4-6 μm. The basidia are 0-47 x 6-7 μm, and four-spored.

== Ecology ==
Gliophorus chromolimoneus is a common saprotrophic species of fungus, deriving its nutrition from decaying organic matter. The fruiting bodies appear between December and June among the leaf litter under Nothofagus, Kunzea ericoides and Leptospermum scoparium trees, or in mixed broad-leafed and conifer woodland with Dacrydium cupressinum, Metrosideros umbellata and Podocarpus laetus. It sometimes grows on mossy banks and occasionally on rotten wood.
