= Phaeocollybia kauffmanii =

Scientific classification
- Kingdom: Fungi
- Division: Basidiomycota
- Class: Agaricomycetes
- Order: Agaricales
- Family: Cortinariaceae
- Genus: Phaeocollybia
- Species: P. kauffmanii

Binomial name
- Phaeocollybia kauffmanii A.H. Sm., Singer

Species of fungus

Phaeocollybia kauffmanii Mycological characteristics
- Gills on hymenium
- Cap is conical or convex
- Hymenium is adnexed or free
- Stipe is bare
- Spore print is brown
- Ecology is mycorrhizal
- Edibility is unknown

Phaeocollybia kauffmanii, commonly known as the giant phaeocollybia, is a species of mushroom in the family Hymenogastraceae. It is found in Western North America, and has a slimy cap.

== Description ==
The cap of Phaeocollybia kauffmanii is about 5-15 centimeters in diameter. It starts out conical, and sometimes expands to convex with an umbo. When wet, it is covered in a copious layer of slime. It is brownish or orange in color. The gills are adnexed to free. They start out buff in color, before becoming brown and eventually rusty brown as the mushroom gets older. The stipe is usually between 20 and 30 centimeters long, but can grow to be up to 40 centimeters long. However, only about 4-12 centimeters of it are visible aboveground. It is about1-3.5 centimeters wide, and tapers underground. The spore print is brown.

== Habitat and ecology ==
Phaeocollybia kauffmanii is found in conifer forests, where it is mycorrhizal.
