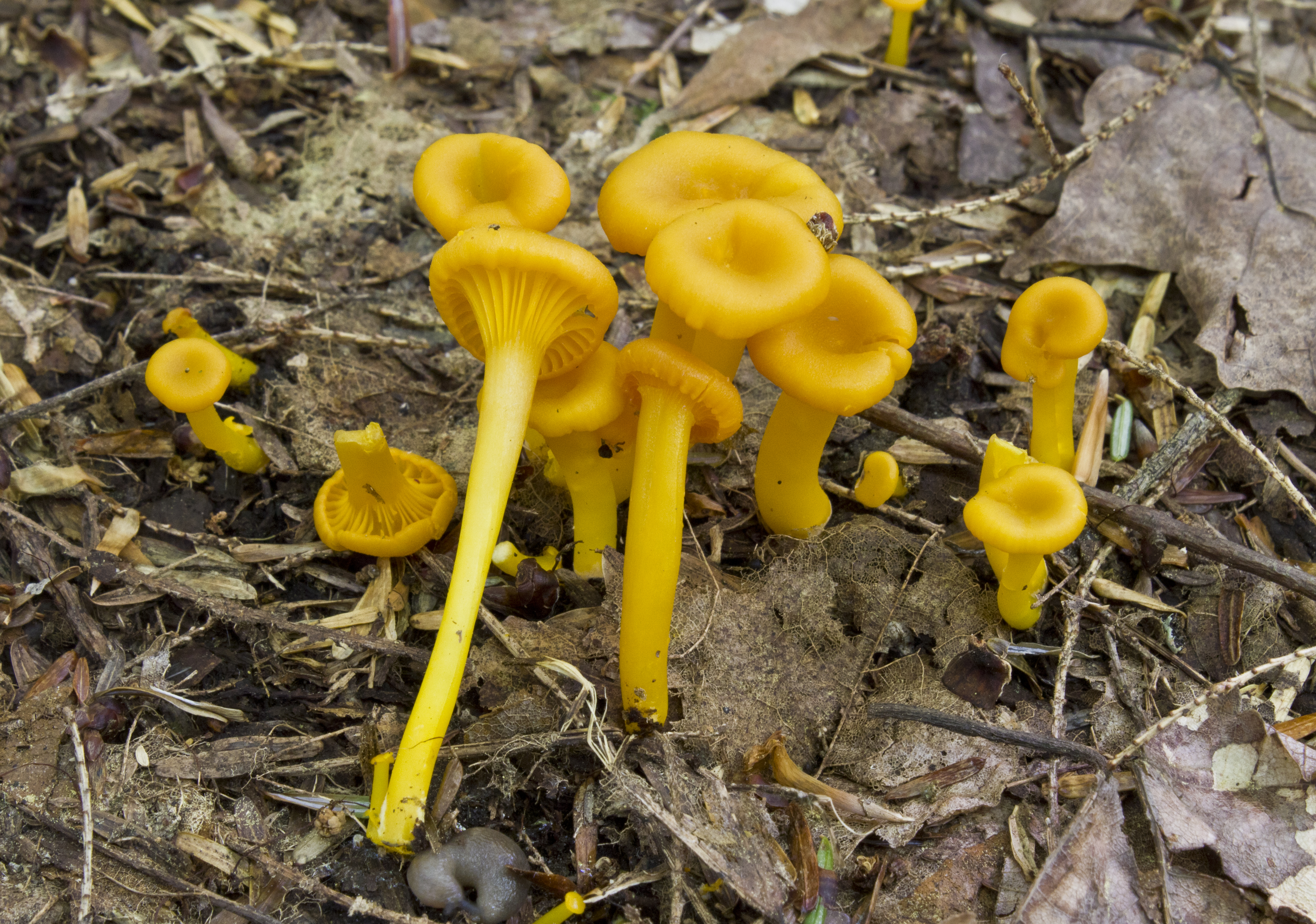
- Gloioxanthomyces nitidus

Scientific classification
- Kingdom: Fungi
- Division: Basidiomycota
- Class: Agaricomycetes
- Order: Agaricales
- Family: Hygrophoraceae
- Genus: Gloioxanthomyces
- Species: G. nitidus

Binomial name
- Gloioxanthomyces nitidus (Berk. & M.A.Curtis) Lodge, Vizzini, Ercole & Boertm. (2013)

Synonyms
- Hygrophorus nitidus Berk. & M.A.Curtis (1853); Hygrocybe nitida (Berk. & M.A.Curtis) Murrill (1916); Gliophorus nitidus (Berk. & M.A.Curtis) Kovalenko (1988); Hygrocybe nitida var. lutea Murrill (1939)

= Gloioxanthomyces nitidus =

Species of fungus

Gloioxanthomyces nitidus, commonly known as the shining waxcap, is a species of fungus in the family Hygrophoraceae.

== Taxonomy ==
It was originally described by Miles Berkeley and Moses Ashley Curtis in 1853 as a species of Hygrophorus. The specific epithet nitidus means "shining". It was one of two species transferred to the newly created genus Gloioxanthomyces in 2013.

== Description ==
The fruitbodies have convex, apricot-yellow to orange caps that are 1–4 cm (1/2–1 1/2 in) in diameter. The pale yellow, waxy gills are decurrent, with a somewhat distant spacing. Other than the gills and the base of the stipe, the bright coloring of the fruitbody fades with age. The spores are elliptical, smooth, and measure 6.5–9 by 4–6 μm.

== Distribution and habitat ==
It is found in North America, where it grows on the ground (often among mosses) in groups in coniferous or mixed forests. It prefers bogs, swamps, and similar moist habitats.
