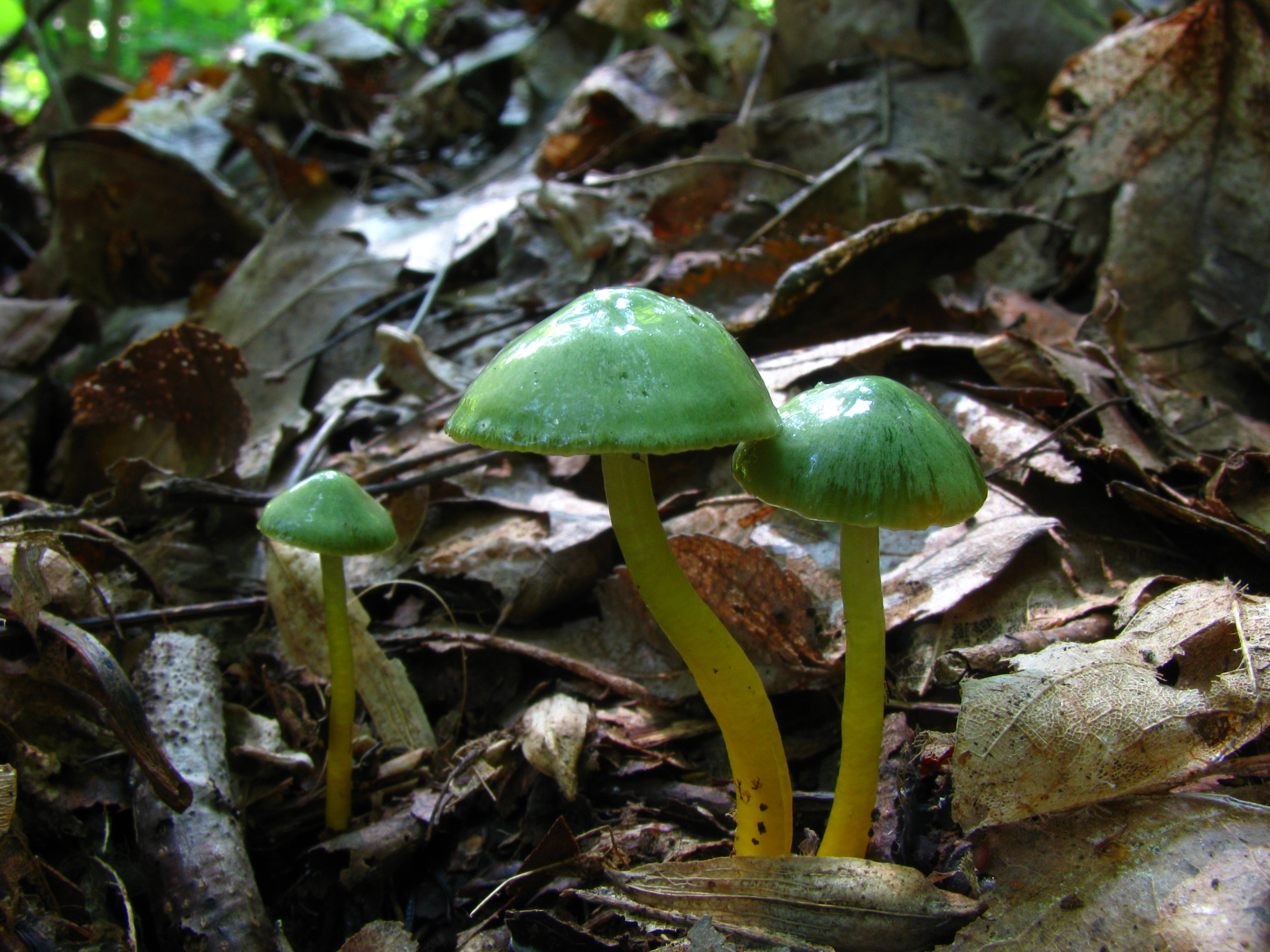

Scientific classification
- Kingdom: Fungi
- Division: Basidiomycota
- Class: Agaricomycetes
- Order: Agaricales
- Family: Hygrophoraceae
- Genus: Gliophorus
- Species: G. psittacinus

Binomial name
- Gliophorus psittacinus (Schaeff.) Herink (1958)

Synonyms
- Agaricus dentatus L. (1753); Agaricus psittacinus Schaeff. (1774); Agaricus cameleon Bull. (1792); Hygrophorus psittacinus (Schaeff.) Fr. (1838); Hygrocybe psittacina (Schaeff.) P. Kumm. (1871); Bolbitius dentatus (L.) Kuntze (1898)

= Gliophorus psittacinus =

Edible mushroom found across Northern Europe

Gliophorus psittacinus
- Mycological characteristics
- Gills on hymenium
- Cap is convex
- Hymenium is adnate
- Stipe is bare
- Spore print is white
- Ecology is mycorrhizal
- Edibility is edible

Gliophorus psittacinus, commonly known as the parrot mushroom, parrot toadstool or parrot waxcap, is a colourful mushroom that is a member of the genus Gliophorus. It was formerly known as Hygrocybe psittacina, but a molecular phylogenetics study found it to belong in the genus Gliophorus. It had already been placed in Gliophorus, but it had been considered a synonym of Hygrocybe. It has a cosmopolitan distribution.

== Description ==
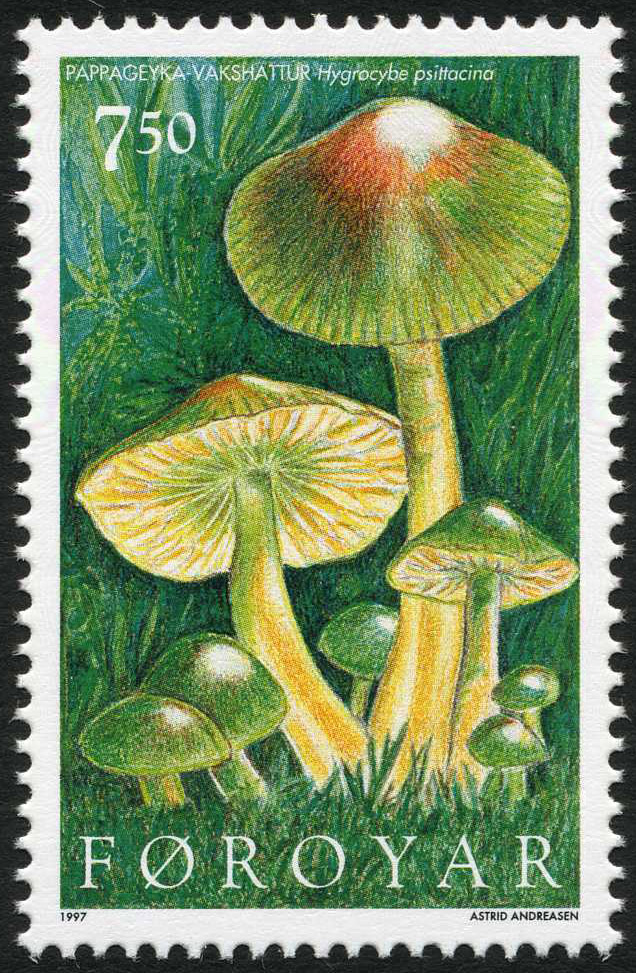
On Faroe Islands stamp

The parrot toadstool is a small mushroom, with a convex to umbonate cap up to 4 centimetres (1.6 in) in diameter, which is green when young and later yellowish or even pinkish tinged. The stipe, measuring 2–8 cm (0.8–3.1 in) in length and 3–5 mm in width, is green to greenish yellow. The broad adnate gills are greenish with yellow edges and spore print white. The green colouring persists at the stem apex even in old specimens. The spores are white, elliptical, smooth and inamyloid. The spore print is white.

Its odour and taste are mild. There are no known chemical tests.

It fruits late summer to autumn (September to November).

=== Similar species ===
It can resemble other species of its genus and Bolbitius callistus.

== Distribution and habitat ==
Gliophorus psittacinus is widely distributed in grasslands in western Europe, United Kingdom, Iceland, Greenland, North America, Americas, South Africa, Japan, being found in late summer and autumn.

Early Australian records of this form have been found to be the similar green toadstools Gliophorus graminicolor or G. viridis on reexamination. Gliophorus psittacinus is known to occur at one site in the Lane Cove River valley near Sydney.

== Conservation ==
In Europe it is apparently in decline due to the degradation of habitats.

== Edibility ==
Gliophorus psittacinus is generally considered edible, but not worthwhile due to its small size and sliminess.
