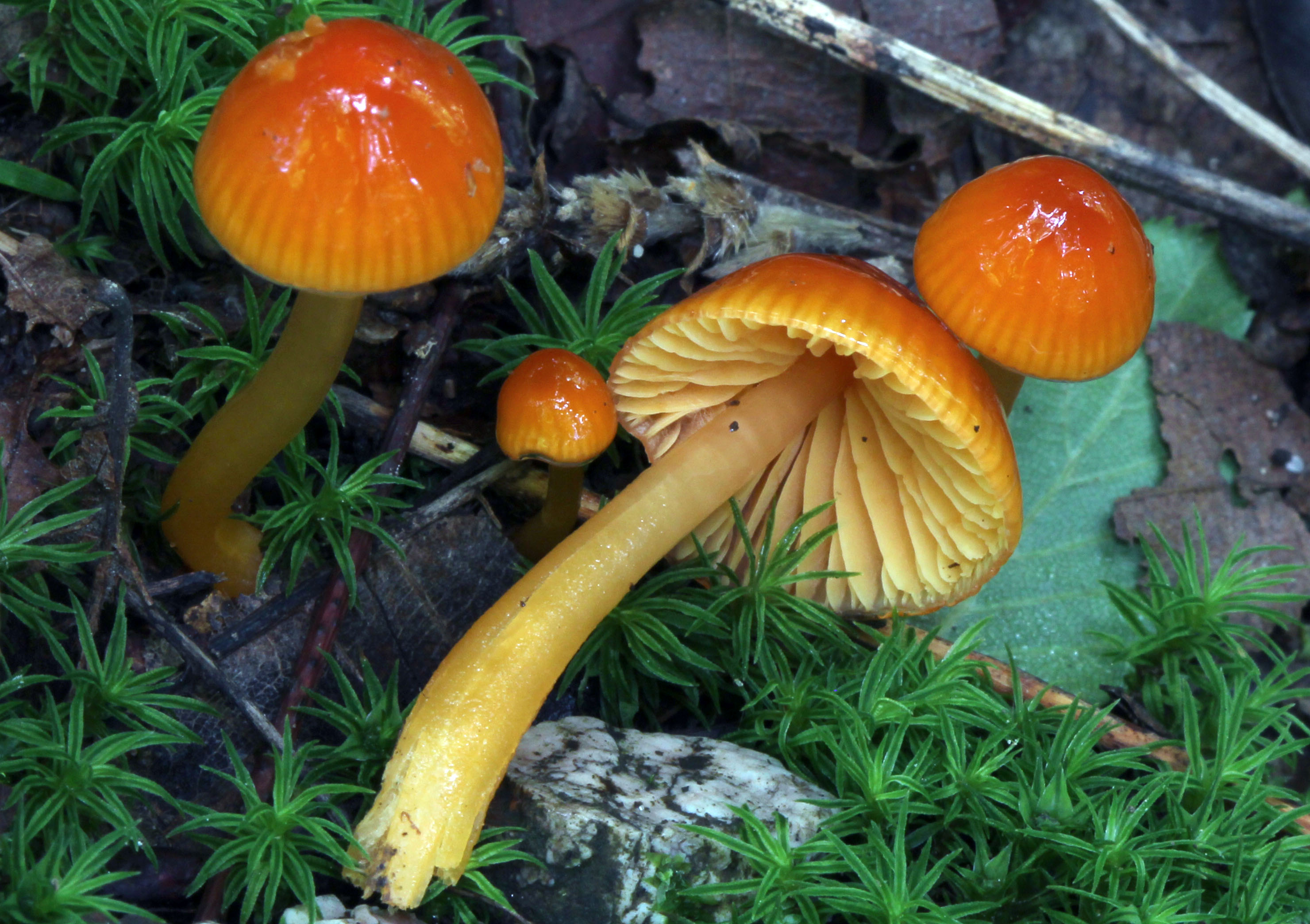

Scientific classification
- Kingdom: Fungi
- Division: Basidiomycota
- Class: Agaricomycetes
- Order: Agaricales
- Family: Hygrophoraceae
- Genus: Gliophorus
- Species: G. perplexus

Binomial name
- Gliophorus perplexus (A.H.Sm. & Hesler) Kovalenko (1989)

Synonyms
- Hygrophorus perplexus A.H.Sm. & Hesler (1954); Hygrocybe perplexa (A.H.Sm. & Hesler) Arnolds (1985); Hygrocybe psittacina var. perplexa (A.H.Sm. & Hesler) Boertm. (1995)

= Gliophorus perplexus =

Species of fungus

Gliophorus perplexus is a species of agaric fungus in the family Hygrophoraceae. It was first described in 1954 by American mycologists Alexander H. Smith and Lexemuel Ray Hesler as Hygrophorus perplexus.

== Description ==
Gliophorus perplexus is a small and slimy mushroom, with the cap barely reaching over an inch and the stipe (stem) two and a half inches in maturity. The sliminess, which covers all parts of the fruiting body including the gills, is a characteristic of the entire genus. The cap color ranges from yellow to orange, can sometimes have an umbo (central bump), and has translucent striations on the cap margin. The gills are pale pink when young and can become yellow-orange in maturity. The stipe is usually a more yellow or paler colored version of the cap, and is hollow.

=== Similar Species ===
When young, Gliophorus psittacinus has strong green colors that fade upon maturity.

== Ecology ==
Gliophorus perplexus is thought to be saprobic, but more research is needed.

== Edibility ==
While not poisonous, G. perplexus is too small to be considered as a viable edible.
