= Egon Horak =

Austrian mycologist

Egon Horak (born Innsbruck in 1937) is an Austrian mycologist who has described more than 1000 species of fungi, including many from the Southern Hemisphere, particularly New Zealand and South America. He was an executive editor of the scientific journal Sydowia from 1975 to 1989, and a member of the editorial board afterwards.

He was previously married to the Swiss-Australian entomologist Marianne Horak.

== Selected publications ==
- Horak, E.; Moser, M. (1965). Fungi Austroamericani. XII. Studien zur Gattung Thaxterogaster Singer. Nova Hedwigia 10 (1,2): 211–241.
- Horak, E. (1971). Contributions to the knowledge of the Agaricales s.l. (Fungi) of New Zealand. New Zealand Journal of Botany 9 (3): 463–493.
- Moser, M.; Horak, E. (1975). Cortinarius Fr. und nahe verwandte Gattungen in Südamerika. Nova Hedwigia Beihefte 52: 1–628.
- Horak, E. (1977, publ. 1978). Entoloma in South America I. Sydowia 30 (1–6): 40–111.
- Horak, E. (1979, publ. 1980). Fungi, Basidiomycetes. Agaricales y Gasteromycetes secotioides. In S.A. Guarrera, I.J. Gamundí de Amos & C.M. Matteri [eds], Flora Criptogámica de Tierra del Fuego 11 (6): 524 pp.
- Horak, E. (1985). Die Pilzflora (Macromyceten) und ihre Oekologie in fünf Pflanzengesellschaften der mountain-subalpinen Stufe des Unterengadins (Schweiz). Ergebnisse der Wissenschaftlichen Untersuchung des Schweizerischen Nationalparks 12 (6): 337–476.
- Horak, E. (1987). Astrosporina in the alpine zone of the Swiss National Park (SNP) and adjacent regions. In G.A. Laursen, J.F. Ammirati & S.A. Redhead [eds], Arctic and Alpine Mycology 2: 205–234.
- Horak, E. (1987, publ. 1988). New species of Dermocybe (Agaricales) from New Zealand. Sydowia 40: 81–112.
- Horak, E. (1990). Monograph of the New Zealand Hygrophoraceae (Agaricales). New Zealand Journal of Botany 28 (3): 255–306.
- Horak, E.; Baici, A. (1990). Beitrag zur Kenntnis der Basidiomycota (Aphyllophorales s.l. — Heterobasidiomycetes) im Unterengadin (GR, Schweiz). Mycologia Helvetica 3 (4): 351–384.
- Horak, E.; Wood, A.E. (1990). Cortinarius Fr. (Agaricales) in Australasia. 1. Subgen. Myxacium and subgen. Paramyxacium. Sydowia 42: 88–168.
- Gamundí, I.J.; Horak, E. (1993). Hongos de los Bosques Andino-Patagónicos. Guía Para el Reconocimiento de las Especies Más Comunes y Atractivas. 141 pp.
- Bougher, N.L.; Fuhrer, B.A.; Horak, E. (1994). Taxonomy and biogeography of Australian Rozites species mycorrhizal with Nothofagus and Myrtaceae. Australian Systematic Botany 7 (4): 353–375.
- Maas Geesteranus, R.A.; Horak, E. (1995). Mycena and related genera from Papua New Guinea and New Caledonia. Bibliotheca Mycologica 159: 143–229.

== Eponyms of Egon Horak ==
=== Eponymous genera ===
- Horakia Oberw. 1976
- Horakiella Castellano & Trappe 1992,
- Horakomyces Raithelh. 1983

=== Eponymous species ===
- Boletus horakii T.N.Lakh. & R.Sharma 1989
- Ciboria horakii Svrček 1960
- Cortinarius horakii E.Valenz. & Esteve-Rav. 1994
- Hohenbuehelia horakii Courtec. 1984
- Inocybe horakii Raithelh. 1977
- Lactarius horakii Nuytinck & Verbeken 2006
- Pluteus horakianus Rodr.-Alcánt. 2009
- Psathyrella horakiana Raithelh. 1990
- Pseudomitrula horakii Gamundí 1980
- Psilocybe horakii Guzmán 1978
- Clitopilus horakii Pacioni & Lalli 1984
- Tricholoma horakii Raithelh. 1972

== See also ==
- Category:Taxa named by Egon Horak
- List of mycologists
