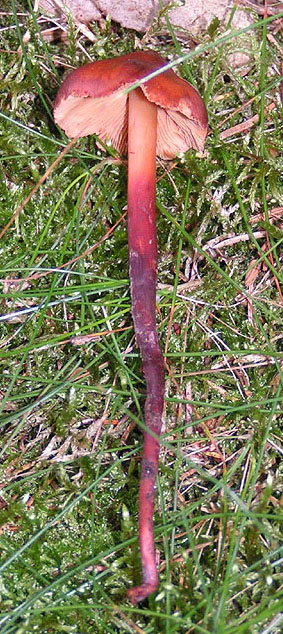
- Phaeocollybia jennyae

Scientific classification
- Kingdom: Fungi
- Division: Basidiomycota
- Class: Agaricomycetes
- Order: Agaricales
- Family: Cortinariaceae
- Genus: Phaeocollybia; R.Heim (1931)

Type species
- Phaeocollybia lugubris (Fr.) R.Heim (1931)

Synonyms
- Quercella Velen. (1921) nom. rej.

= Phaeocollybia =

Genus of fungi

Phaeocollybia is a genus of fungi in the family Hymenogastraceae. They are characterized by producing fruit bodies (mushrooms) with umbonate caps and rough brown spores. The genus is widely distributed (especially in temperate regions). As of January 2026, the genus contained about 90 species. They are known for a long stipe which continues down into the ground, known as a rooting stipe or pseudorhiza formed as the fruitbody grows up from the subterranean colonized roots well below the organic soil layer. The genus is primarily mycorrhizal but may also be somewhat parasitic on forest trees.

Molecular phylogenetic work during the 2000s suggests a close relationship to Galerina.

== Taxonomy ==
The genus was circumscribed by mycologist Roger Heim in 1931. The name Phaeocollybia is conserved against the earlier but obscure name Quercella. Phaeocollybia means dusky Collybia which actually refers to the brownish spore print in contrast to the white spore print of Collybia in the traditional sense.

== Description ==
Phaeocollybia is defined as mushrooms, with a glutinous or moist or sometimes dry and innately scaly, conic, umbonate cap, a rooting, cartilaginous to wiry stipe, generally lacking a visible veil or cortina or with faint traces, and spores which are brown in deposit. The spores are ornamented but will lack a germ pore or plage. The most distinctive feature microscopically is the presence of tibiiform cystidia or branches on the mycelium and mycorrhizal sheaths.

== See also ==
- List of Phaeocollybia species
