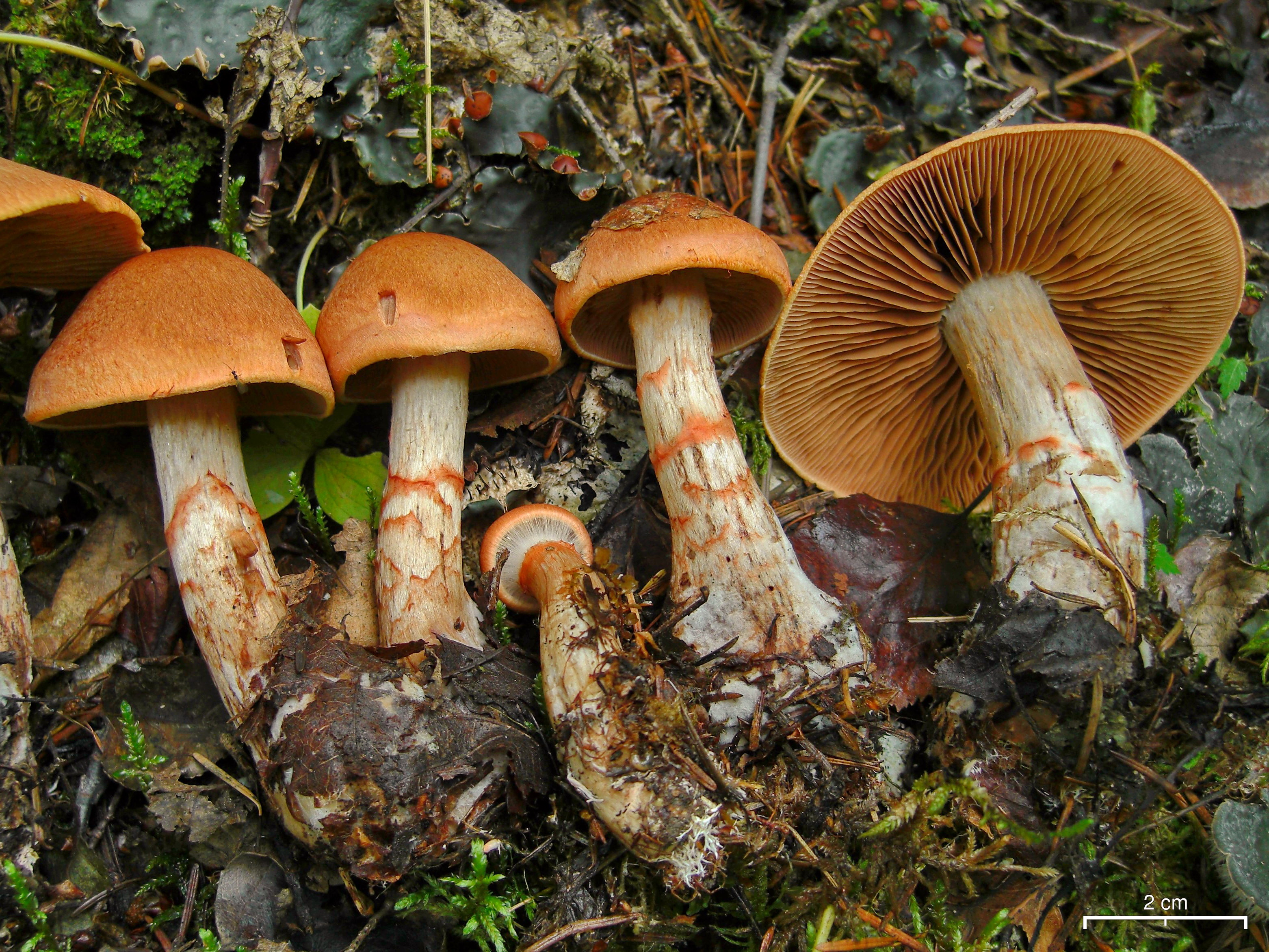

Scientific classification
- Kingdom: Fungi
- Division: Basidiomycota
- Class: Agaricomycetes
- Order: Agaricales
- Family: Cortinariaceae
- Genus: Cortinarius
- Species: C. armillatus

Binomial name
- Cortinarius armillatus (Fr.) Fr. [1838]

= Cortinarius armillatus =

Species of fungus

Cortinarius armillatus
- Mycological characteristics
- Gills on hymenium
- Cap is campanulate or convex
- Hymenium is adnate or sinuate
- Stipe has a cortina
- Spore print is brown
- Ecology is mycorrhizal
- Edibility is not recommended

Cortinarius armillatus is a species of fungus in the family Cortinariaceae. Basidiocarps (fruit bodies) are agaricoid (mushroom-shaped) with distinctive orange-red bands of veil on the stipe (stem). The species is ectomycorrhizal, associating with birch. In the UK, it has the recommended English name of red banded webcap. In North America, it is known as the red-banded cort or bracelet cortinarius. The species is distributed in Europe and North America.

== Taxonomy ==
The species was first described in 1821 by Swedish mycologist Elias Magnus Fries as Agaricus armillatus. Fries subsequently (1838) placed it in Cortinarius.

== Description ==
The pileus (cap) is 4 to 13 centimetres (1 1/2 to 5 in) wide, orange-brown, convex then flattening out, sometimes developing small scales. The gills are tan when young, then rusty brown. They are somewhat close and shallowly sinuate. The spore print is rusty brown.

The stipe (stem) is up to 15 cm (6 in) long and 2.5 cm (1 in) thick, whitish at first becoming brownish. It is usually wider at the base and has 1–5 vivid orange-red bands. The flesh is light brown and its scent mild to radish-like.

The spores are brownish, warted, amygdaloid (almond-shaped), dextrinoid, and measure 9.5–12 by 6–7 μm.

=== Similar species ===
The orange-red banding and association with birch should make Cortinarius armillatus a distinctive species. In Scandinavia, the similar but rarer C. roseoarmillatus also occurs with birch, but has rose-red tones to the pileus and the veil bands. The European and North American C. paragaudis more typically associates with conifers, but can be found with birch. It has wine-red banding on the stipe. In North America, Cortinarius armillatus is also said to resemble C. bolaris, C. boulderensis, C. haematochelis, C. rubicundulus, and C. subtestaceus.

== Habitat and distribution ==
Cortinarius armillatus is a common ectomycorrhizal species with birch in Europe and is also known to occur in North America, especially the northeast. This distribution has been confirmed by molecular research.

== Uses ==
In North America, fruit bodies are of interest to mushroom foragers. Cortinarius armillatus has been considered edible and mediocre to good. Some, however, consider it inedible, and it has been found to contain the toxin orellanine, though at much lower concentrations than the lethal webcaps.

Fruit bodies have also been used by craft dyers. Without added metals they discharge a pinkish beige dye; with tin beige, with copper greenish beige, and with iron dark beige dyes.
