= Mushroom hunting =

Activity of gathering mushrooms in the wild

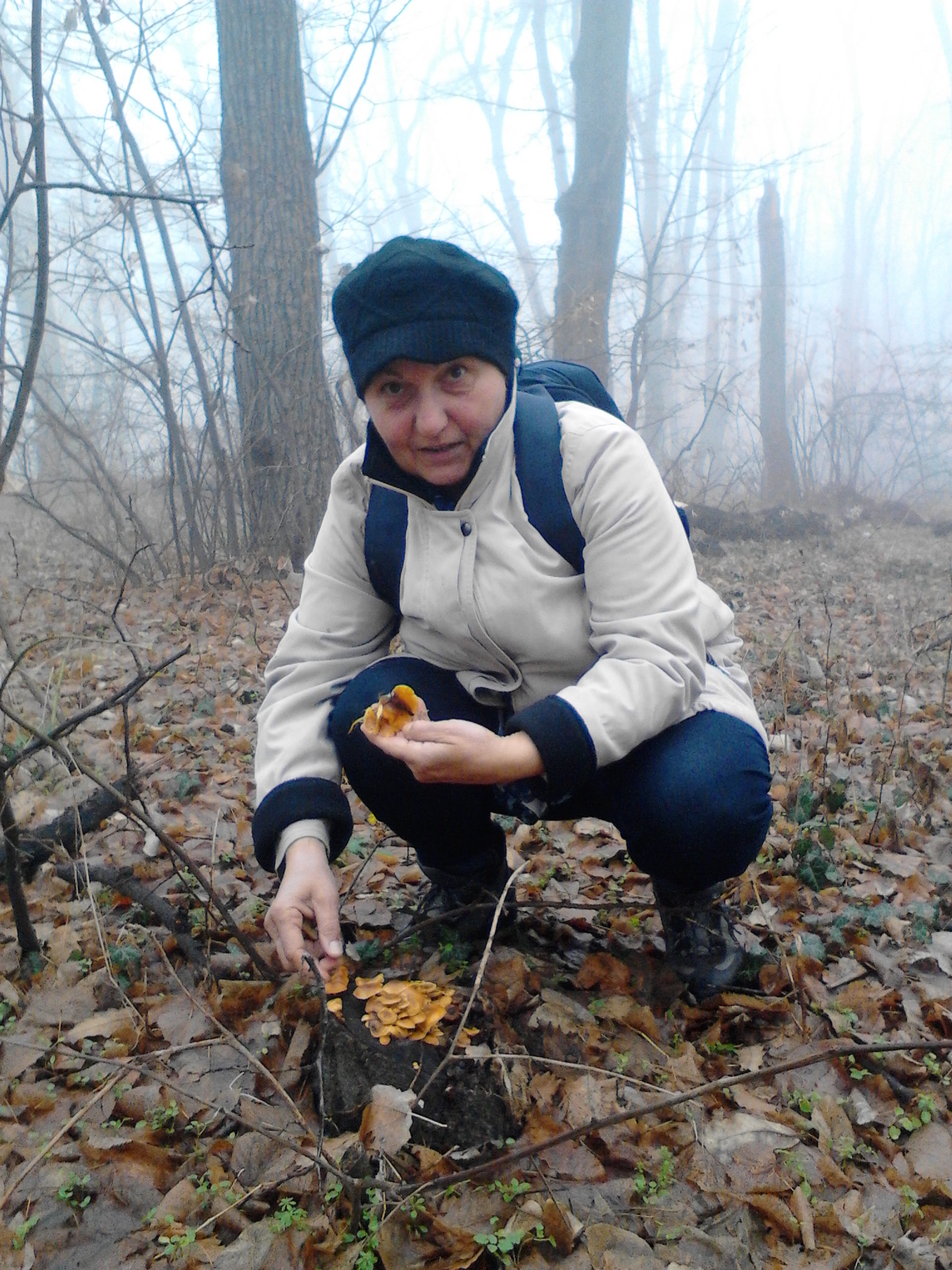
A person foraging mushrooms

Mushroom hunting, also referred to as mushroom foraging, mushroom picking, and mushrooming, is the activity of gathering wild mushrooms. These are collected for use as food (usually cooked and some only conditionally), psychotropic drugs, and dye. Accurate identification is essential to distinguish edible and useful species from poisonous or potentially deadly ones.

The practice is popular throughout most of Eurasia and Australia, as well as in West Africa and temperate North America.

== Identification ==
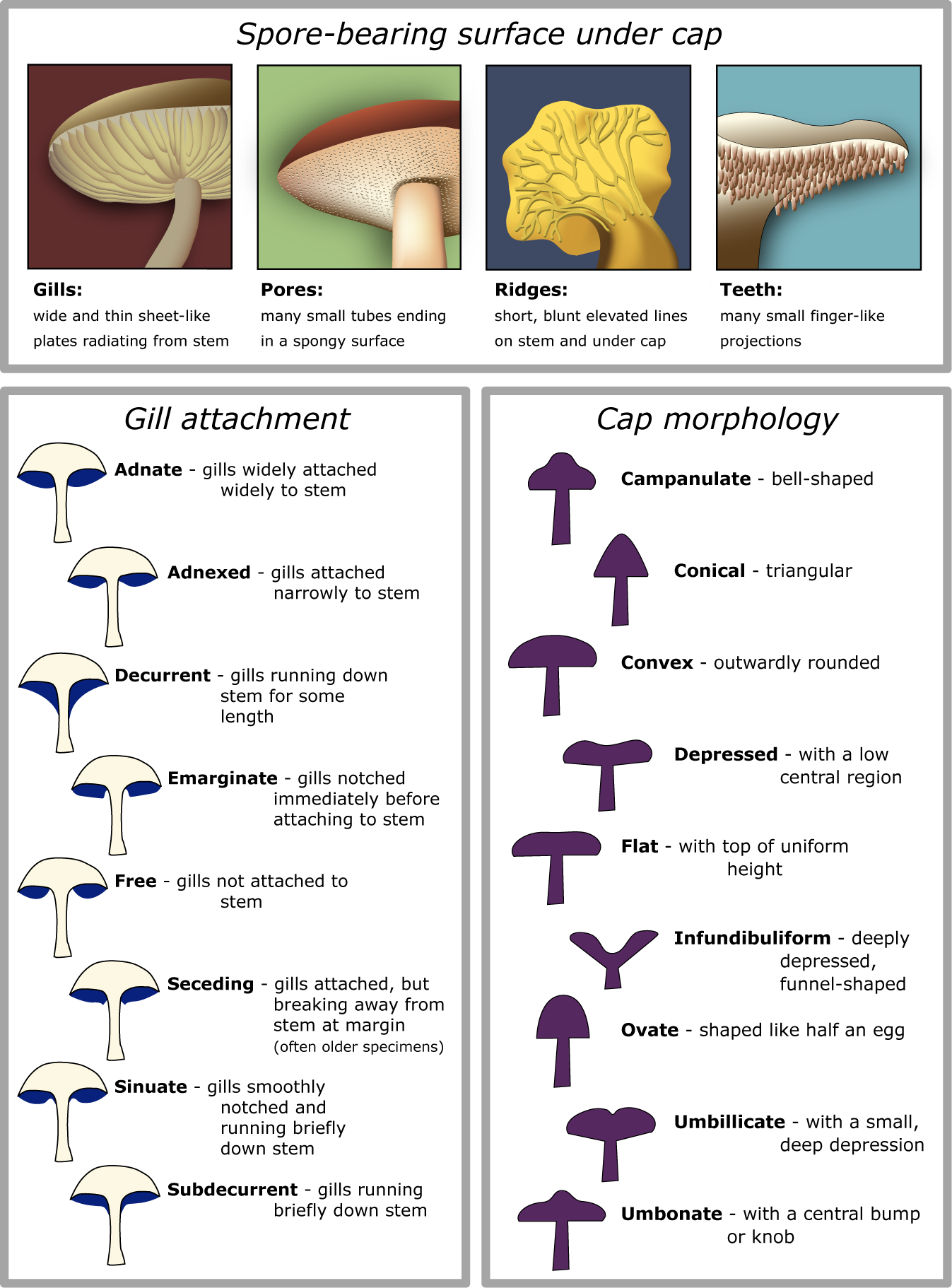
Some morphological characteristics of mushrooms useful in aiding identification

Numerous field guides on mushrooms are available to help distinguish between edible or psychotropic species and poisonous or inedible species. (Outside of biotechnological applications, so-called medicinal fungi are discounted as folk medicine.)

Morphological characteristics of the caps, gills, and stems of mushrooms are often essential for correct visual identification. Microscopy is sometimes needed to eliminate lookalikes. A common identification method is the spore print, in which a mushroom is placed on a surface and spores fall underneath.

Mushrooms generally begin to fruit when it is both warm and moist in their region. In the North American Pacific Northwest, species shortly occur from spring to summer, but are most common in autumn. In the Southwestern United States, mushrooms can be found during the winter rains and spring. In the Midwest and Northeast U.S., they can be found from late April until the frosts of autumn. In the Colorado Rockies, they are best collected in July and August. They can be found through winter on the Gulf Coast.

=== Commonly collected mushrooms ===
Many species of mushrooms are highly prized. Chanterelles, for example, are popular in both Europe and the United States. On the West Coast of the United States, they are harvested commercially. Hedgehog mushrooms, named for the spines on the underside of the cap, are also popular. Morels are another very popular edible mushroom. Lobster mushrooms are edible as well, and have a shellfish-like flavor. They also have no look-alikes. The porcini (Boletus edulis) is also edible and very highly regarded. It is very popular in Italy, and prized for its nutty flavor.

The Caesar's mushroom is another edible mushroom. However, it is in the Amanita genus, and therefore one must be very careful when identifying it. It gets its name because it was popular among Roman emperors. The matsutake, another edible mushroom, is popular in Japan. It also occurs in the Pacific Northwest. There are actually multiple species of matsutakes, and the Japanese species does not occur in North America. The matsutake has a spicy aroma, which David Arora has likened to "Red Hots and dirty socks". Care must be taken to not confuse the matsutake with the extremely poisonous Smith's amanita. Many truffles are also highly prized for their unique flavor and aroma, and can sell for very high prices.

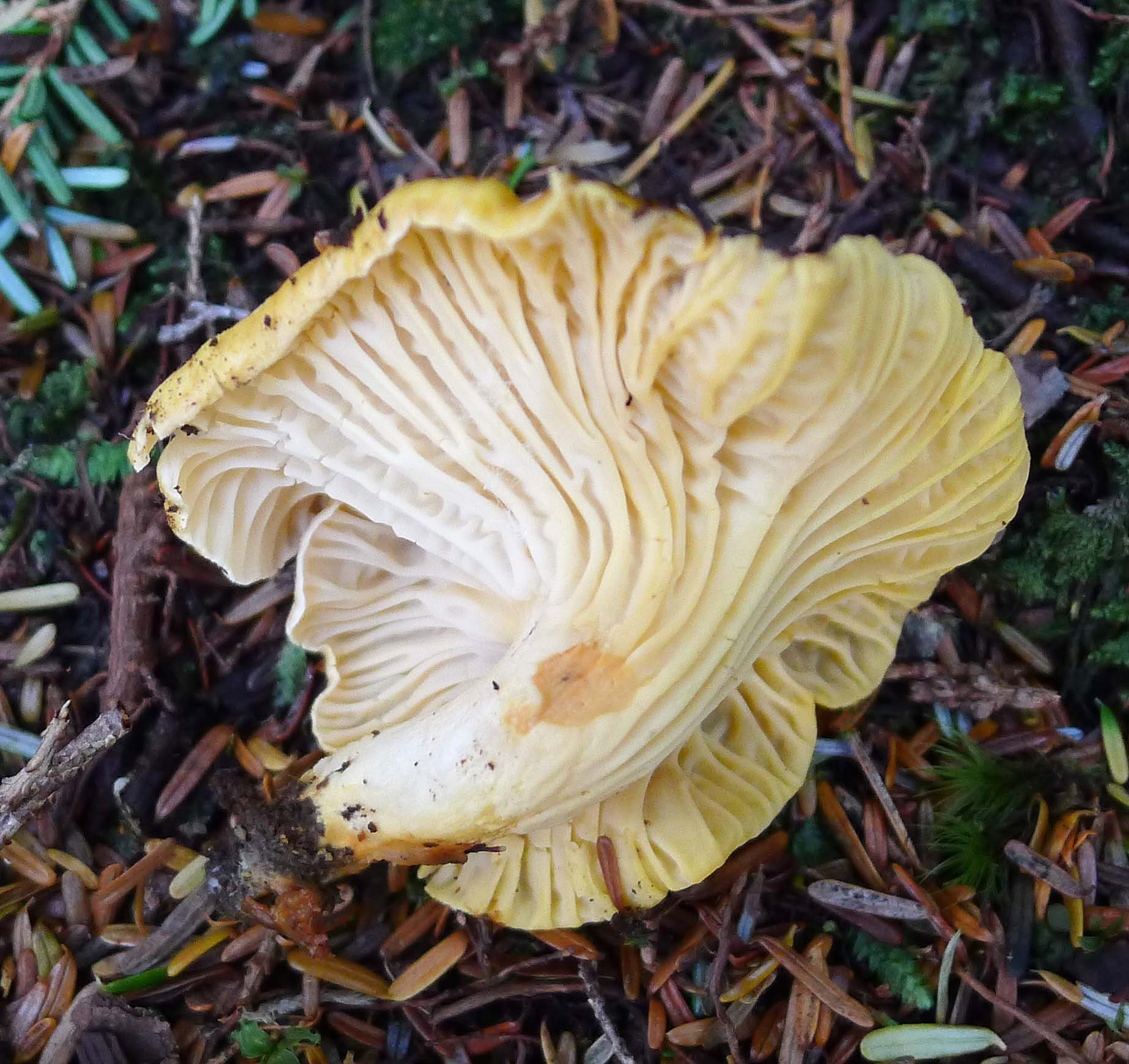
Chanterelle

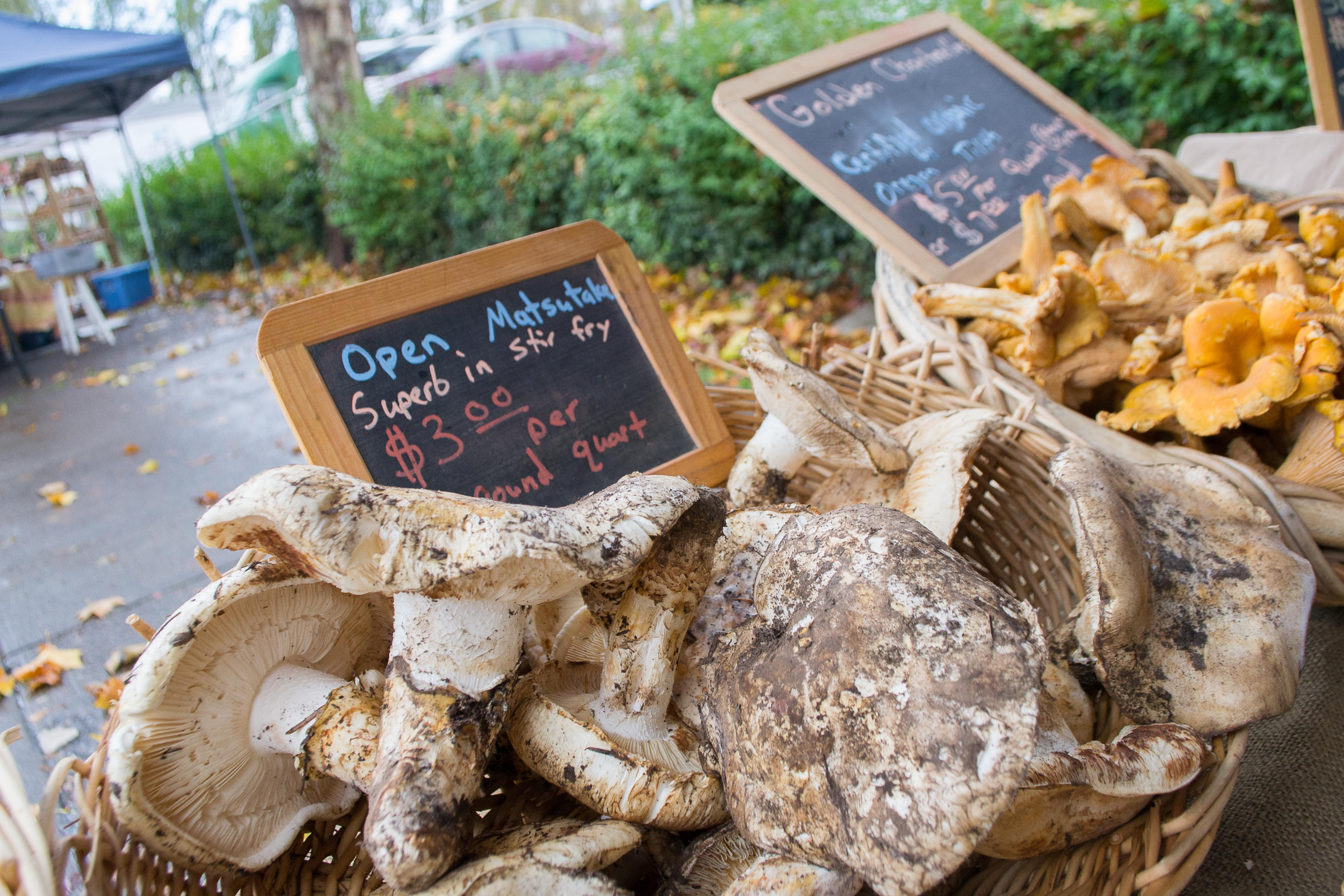
Matsutakes for sale

=== Little brown mushrooms ===
The term little brown mushroom (LBM) refers to any of a large number of small, dull-coloured agaric species, with few uniquely distinguishing macromorphological characteristics. As a result, LBMs typically range from difficult to impossible for mushroom hunters to identify. Experienced mushroom hunters may discern more subtle identifying traits that help narrow the mushroom down to a particular genus or group of species, but exact identification of LBMs often requires close examination of microscopic characteristics plus a certain degree of familiarity or specialization in that particular group.

Additionally, boring ubiquitous mushroom (BUM) describes groups of difficult to identify larger agarics, many of which are in the genus Hebeloma. Just another Russula (JAR) can refer to any species of Russula that is common or difficult to identify. Yet another Mycena (YAM) describes any of the many Mycena species that are common, nondescript, or difficult to identify.

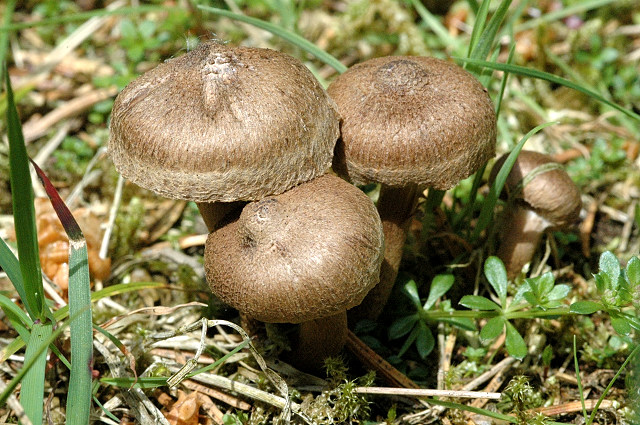
Inocybe lacera, a typical LBM best identified via microscopy

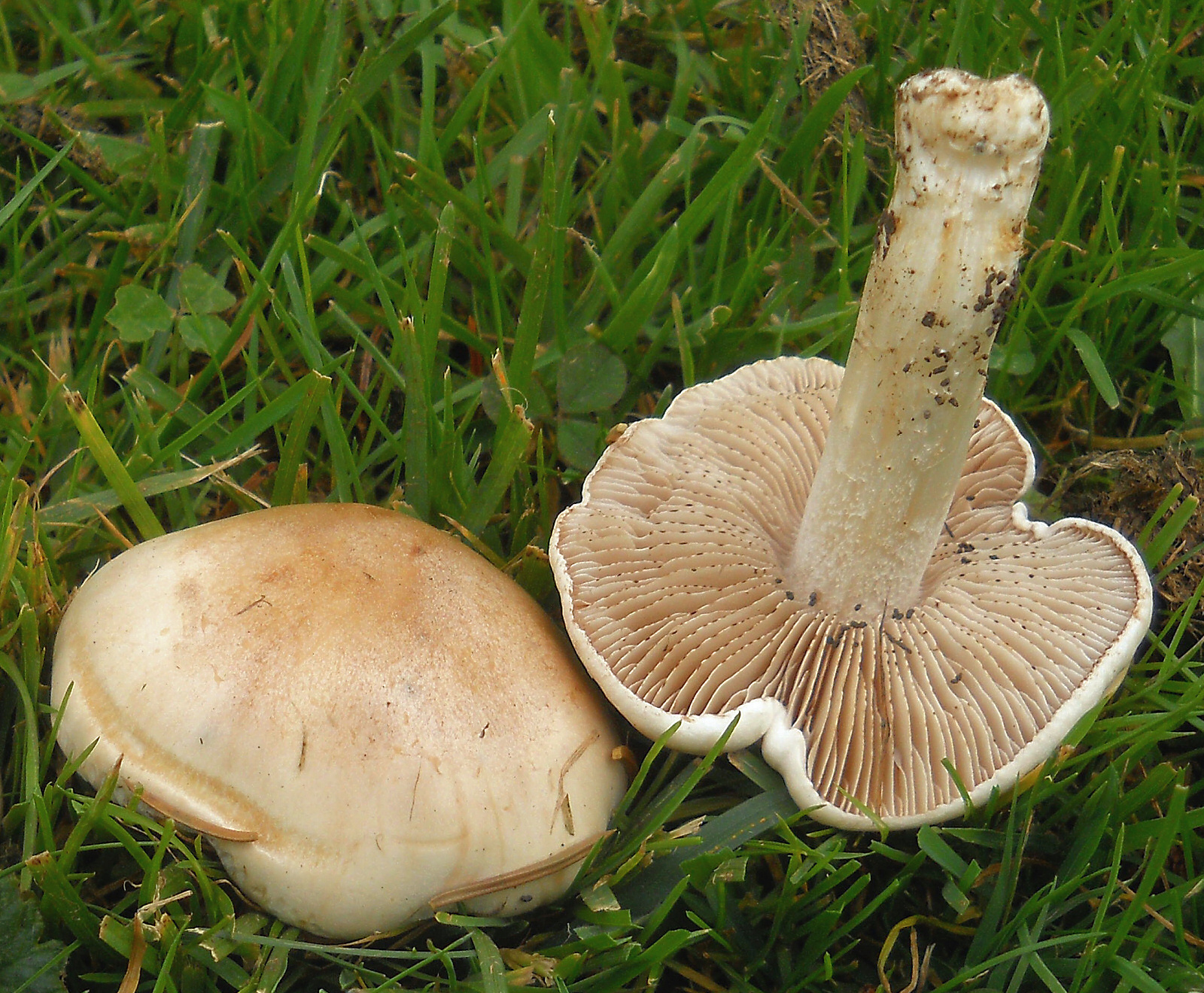
The difficult-to-distinguish Hebeloma crustuliniforme

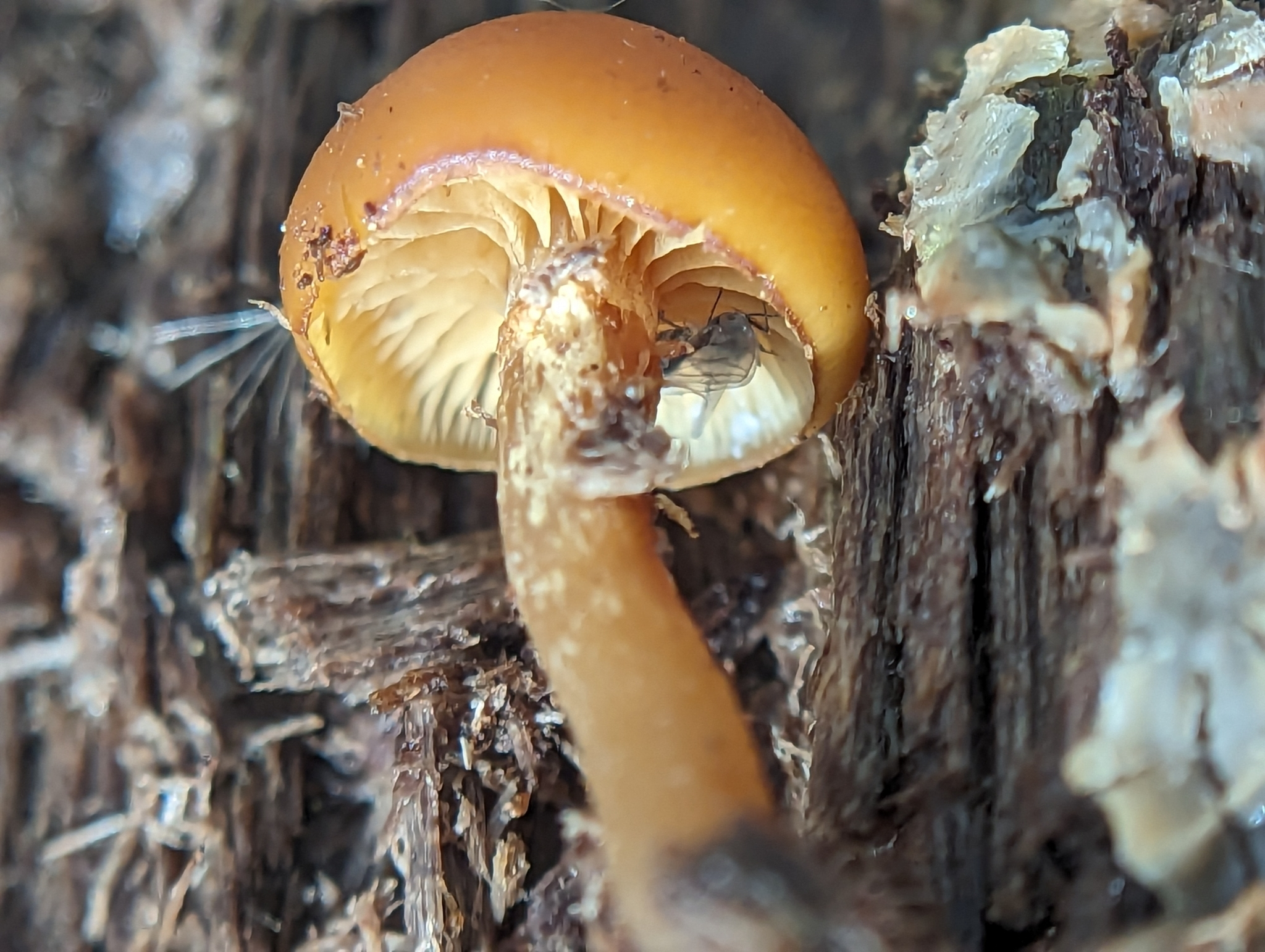
Galerina marginata is another LBM, and is extremely toxic.

== Habitat ==
Particular mushrooms are associated with certain conditions such as proximity to certain types of trees and habitat. Mycologist David Arora provides an exhaustive list.

=== By season ===
Winter:

- Craterellus cornucopioides
- Craterellus tubaeformis
- Hydnum repandum
- Tuber (includes truffles)

Spring:

- Morchella (morels)
- Pleurotus (oyster mushrooms)
- Puffballs
- Snowbank fungi

Summer:

- Chanterelles
- Hypomyces lactifluorum (lobster mushroom)
- Morchella
- Sparassis (cauliflower mushrooms)

Autumn:

- Agaricus augustus (the prince)
- Armillaria (honey fungi)
- Cantharellus subalbidus (white chanterelle)
- Hericium americanum (bear's head tooth)
- Hericium erinaceus (lion's mane)
- Lactarius deliciosus (saffron milky cap)
- Laetiporus (chicken fungi)
- Pleurocybella porrigens (angel wing)
- Polyozellus (blue chanterelles)
- Snowbank fungi
- Tricholoma equestre (man on horseback)
- Tricholoma matsutake

=== By tree ===
Cypress:

- Agaricus
- Camarophyllus
- Hygrocybe

Douglas-fir:

- Cantharellus
- Cortinarius
- Gomphidius
- Mycena
- Rhizopogon

Oak:

- Amanita
- Boletus
- Cortinarius
- Entoloma
- Hygrophorus
- Mycena
- Tuber

Pine:

- Chroogomphus
- Clitocybe
- Cortinarius
- Hydnellum
- Laccaria
- Mycena
- Pholiota
- Rhizopogon
- Suillus

Redwood:

- Camarophyllus
- Clitocybe
- Geoglossum
- Helvella
- Hygrocybe
- Lepiota
- Leptonia
- Mycena
- Xeromphalina

=== By habitat ===
Lawns and gardens:

- Agaricus
- Bovista
- Calvatia
- Coprinus
- Lepiota
- Melanoleuca
- Morchella
- Pholiota
- Psilocybe
- Stropharia

Riparian forest:

- Morchella
- Mycena
- Pluteus

== Collection ==
Field mushrooms and a mushroom collecting knife

Although some individual species do not preserve well, many do with proper care. David Arora recommends the use of a firm container such as a basket, with lighter specimens stored above heavier ones and species being separated using waxed paper (not plastic bags, which trap moisture and cause rot); as the negative gravitropism of fungi tends to orient the gills downward, taller mushrooms must be stored upright.

== Poisonous mushrooms ==
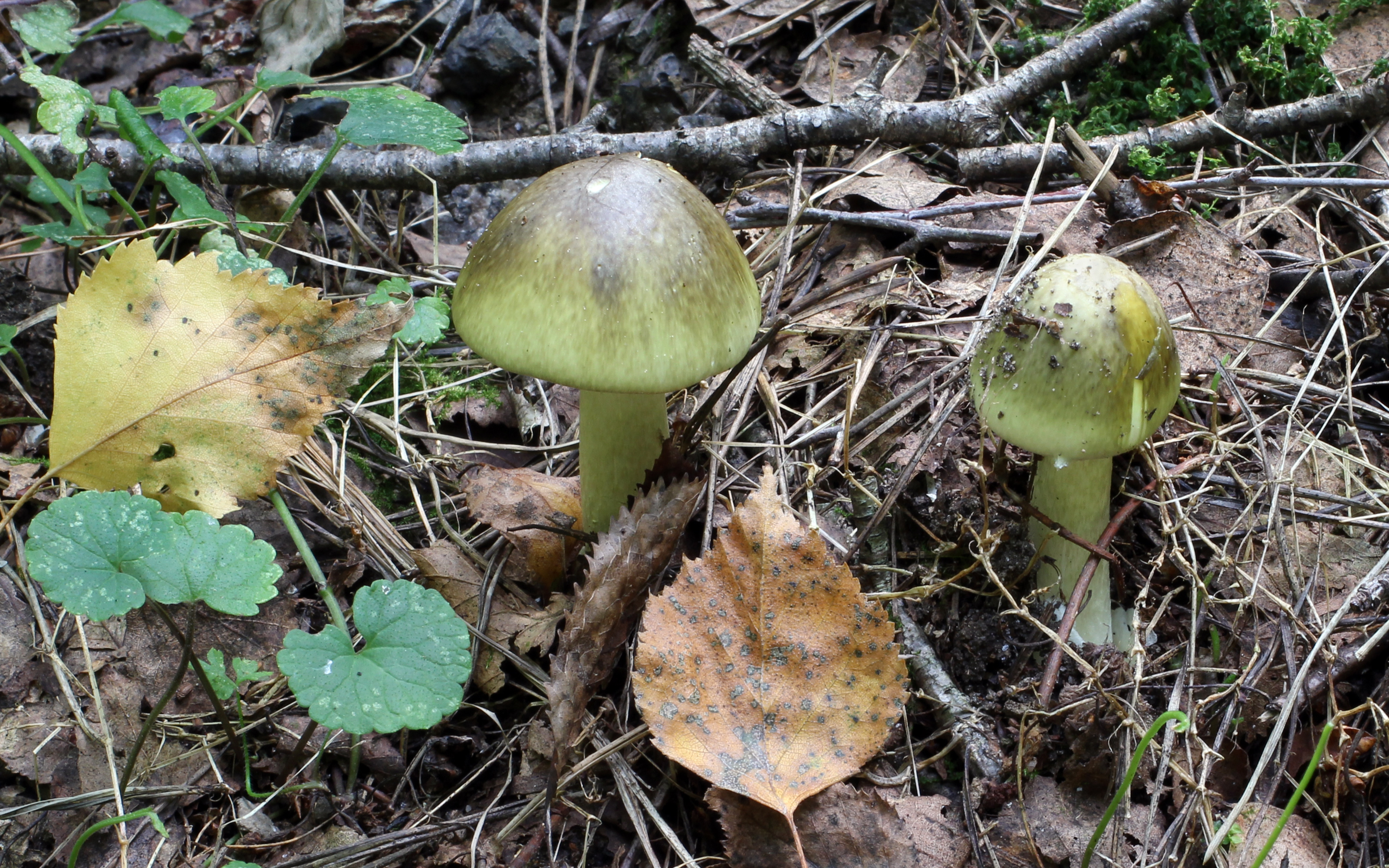
Amanita phalloides, also known as the death cap, a deadly poisonous mushroom.

Mushroom hunting can be dangerous if one is not careful due to the fact that certain edible and poisonous species look alike. While some poisonous mushrooms simply cause digestive upset, others can cause organ failure or even death. Certain species in the genus Amanita, such as the death cap (A. phalloides) and destroying angel (A. ocreata), are the cause of most fatal mushroom poisonings. The deadly Amanita species contain amatoxins, which can cause kidney failure. Death caps can be mistaken for edible paddy straw mushrooms. However, paddy straw mushrooms do not occur in the United States, and are instead found in Asia. When young, death caps can also be confused with edible puffball mushrooms due to their similar shape. However, they can be differentiated if cut open. While a puffball is solid white inside, a young death cap has a mushroom shape visible. Amanita bisporigera, another amatoxin-containing Amanita species, also known as destroying angel, can be mistaken for edible meadow mushrooms. Galerina marginata and Conocybe rugosa also contain amatoxins. While Galerina marginata is rarely eaten because it is so small, it can sometimes be confused with hallucinogenic Psilocybe species. Cortinarius rubellus and Cortinarius orellanus contain a deadly toxin called orellanine, which can destroy the liver and kidneys. The jack o' lantern mushroom (Omphalatus olearius), which causes gastrointestinal distress, can sometimes be confused with edible chanterelle mushrooms.

Some poisonous species, such as Amanita muscaria, Paxillus involutus, and Gyromitra esculenta, are parboiled and eaten in some places. However, P. involutus has some toxins which cannot be removed by cooking, which accumulate in the body over time and can later be fatal. While G. esculenta is eaten, parboiling does not always remove the toxins so its consumption is not recommended.

== History ==
Mushroom hunting has been practiced for thousands of years in many parts of the world. It has likely been done since the Paleolithic. In 2015, scientists analyzed dental calculus on skeletons dating back to the Paleolithic period in Spain and discovered evidence of mushroom consumption.

=== Ancient times ===
An ancient Sumerian text reveals that the ancient Amorites may have eaten truffles. Ötzi the Iceman, a 5,300 year old mummy found in the Alps, was found with two different species of mushrooms on him: the birch polypore (Fomitopsis betulina) and the hoof fungus (Fomes fomentarius). It is thought that he may have used the former as an antibiotic or anti-inflammatory and that he used the latter as a fire starter.

In ancient Egypt, mushrooms were considered a delicacy and a gift from the god Osiris. Only the nobility were allowed to eat them. Mushrooms were also eaten in ancient Greece and Rome. The Caesar's mushroom (Amanita caesarea) gets its name because it was popular among Roman emperors. Emperor Claudius's wife Agrippa is thought to have poisoned him by serving him Caesar's mushrooms mixed with juices from the deadly poisonous death cap (Amanita phalloides). Truffles were also highly prized in ancient Rome.

In ancient China, the lingzhi mushroom (Ganoderma lucidum) was used medicinally.

=== Middle Ages ===
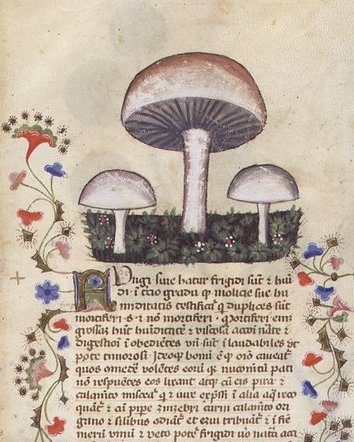
Mushrooms depicted in a medieval manuscript

In medieval Europe, mushroom hunting was done, but mushrooms were also viewed with superstition and skepticism and often associated with witchcraft. In Northern Europe, the fly agaric (Amanita muscaria) was used by Sami shamans in rituals due to its psychotropic properties. In medieval Europe, truffles, field mushrooms, porcinis, chanterelles, and morels were eaten. In the Middle East, people likely ate mushrooms as well. Arab physician Al-Biruni wrote about consumption of several species, including truffles. In China, people began to cultivate shiitake mushrooms during the Middle Ages. In Japan, matsutakes were highly prized and consumption of them was restricted to the imperial court. This law was in practice until the 17th and 18th centuries. Mushroom hunting was popular among the Japanese nobility, who sometimes sent matsutakes as gifts. While mycophobia was prevalent in Europe during the Middle Ages, it began to decline during the Renaissance.

=== Early modern period ===
In the 16th century, consumption of mushrooms was popularized in France. Around this time, the French also began cultivating mushrooms. However, during the early modern period, there was still mycophobia in some places. In England during the 17th century, mycophobia was very common. Mushrooms were associated with filth and were sometimes referred to as "excrements of the earth". However, some people in England did eat mushrooms at that time, and many 17th-century English cookbooks include mushroom recipes. In pre-industrial Scandinavia, mushrooms were not eaten very much and there was so much mycophobia that even in times of desperation, peasantry would not eat mushrooms. The Swedish used A. muscaria as a pesticide. In northern Sweden, dried mushrooms, possibly Melanogaster variegatus, were used as bait in squirrel traps. While mycophobia was common among the peasantry, it was less so among some of the upper class, who enjoyed false morels, St. George's mushrooms, button mushrooms, and possibly Lactarius deterrimus. This may have been due to French influence. It is thought that Holy Roman Emperor Charles VI may have died from eating death cap mushrooms.

=== 19th century ===
In the 19th century, mycology was on the rise, and several influential women including Mary Banning and Beatrix Potter contributed to the field. Around the 1830s in Sweden, some authors began to promote mushroom consumption. In 1836, mycologist Elias Magnus Fries wrote a book about how mushrooms were eaten in many other countries and that he believed Sweden should do the same. In the 1860s, Sweden faced a famine and the government began promoting consumption of mushrooms, but Swedish peasants still didn't eat them. Around this time, European settlers in the Pacific Northwest began picking mushrooms similar to ones in Europe. In the 1880s, mushrooms began to gain popularity in Sweden among city-dwellers and the upper class. In 1896, the British Mycological Society was founded in order to promote mycology. In Poland, mushrooms have been eaten for hundreds of years, with many species being eaten in the late 19th and early 20th centuries. In the late 19th century, American civil war veteran and mycologist Charles McIlvaine collected and tried many different species of mushrooms. He was able to tolerate mushroom species normally considered poisonous, earning him the nickname "Old Iron Guts". He published a field guide of 1,000 edible and poisonous species in 1900.

=== 20th and 21st centuries ===
Around 1912, mushrooms became more recognized as a food ingredient in Sweden, with posters of edible mushrooms being used in schools to promote consumption of mushrooms in the 1920s and 1930s. After World War II, mushroom hunting became even more popular in Sweden, being promoted by many mycologists and enthusiasts. In Britain, mushroom hunting also became more popular due to a food shortage. Also, Polish troops who fought alongside the British in WWII brought Polish culture to the British, which included mushroom hunting. In the 1950s and 1960s, the British began to eat more porcinis and truffles due to the French and Italians also eating them. On 26 April 1986, in Soviet Ukraine, the Chernobyl nuclear power plant experienced a nuclear meltdown, leading to many mushrooms in the region, including edible species, accumulating radioactive materials. This has led to concerns about mushroom hunting; mushrooms as far away as Germany have been found to be contaminated with radioactive material. Hedgehog mushrooms and terracotta hedgehog mushrooms have been found to contain some of the highest levels of radioactive material. After the disaster, the Swedish government discouraged people from eating wild mushrooms. People in Sweden also began to refrain from mushroom hunting due to radiation. In the UK, several mushroom field guides were published in the 1980s and mushroom hunting became more popular in the UK in the 1990s. In the late 1980s to early 1990s, commercial mushroom hunting became a large industry in the Pacific Northwest.

Mushroom hunting is currently popular in many parts of the world, including the West (including the Pacific Northwest) although some mycophobia persists.

== Regional importance ==
Mushroom hunting is popular throughout most of Europe, Asia and Australia, as well as West Africa and temperate regions of Canada and the U.S. In addition to culinary and psychotropic uses, mushrooms can be used for dyeing.

- British enthusiasts enjoy an extended average picking season of 75 days compared to just 33 in the 1950s.
- In Japan, particular mushroom types are hunted, with particular importance given to delicacies such as the Matsutake mushroom.
- In Slavic countries and Baltic countries, mushroom picking is a common family activity. According to David Arora, "The Russians go absolutely bananas for fungus. Mushrooming is a commonplace tradition there, not the hallowed turf of the academic or connoisseur." After a heavy rain during the mushroom season whole families often venture into the nearest forest, picking bucketfuls of mushrooms, which are cooked and eaten for dinner upon return (most often in omelettes with eggs or fried in butter) or alternatively dried or marinated for later consumption. In Southern Lithuania mushroom hunting is considered a "national sport". They even host a Mushroom Festival ("Grybų šventė") in Varėna including a mushroom hunting championship.
- In the U.S., mushroom picking is popular in the Appalachian area and on the west coast from San Francisco Bay northward, in northern California, Oregon and Washington, and in many other regions.
- In Nigeria, the sclerotia of Pleurotus tuber-regium are reportedly added to soups and used medicinally to treat mumps.
- In Cameroon, Flamulina velutipes is considered a delicacy, and gathered by women and children in rural areas.
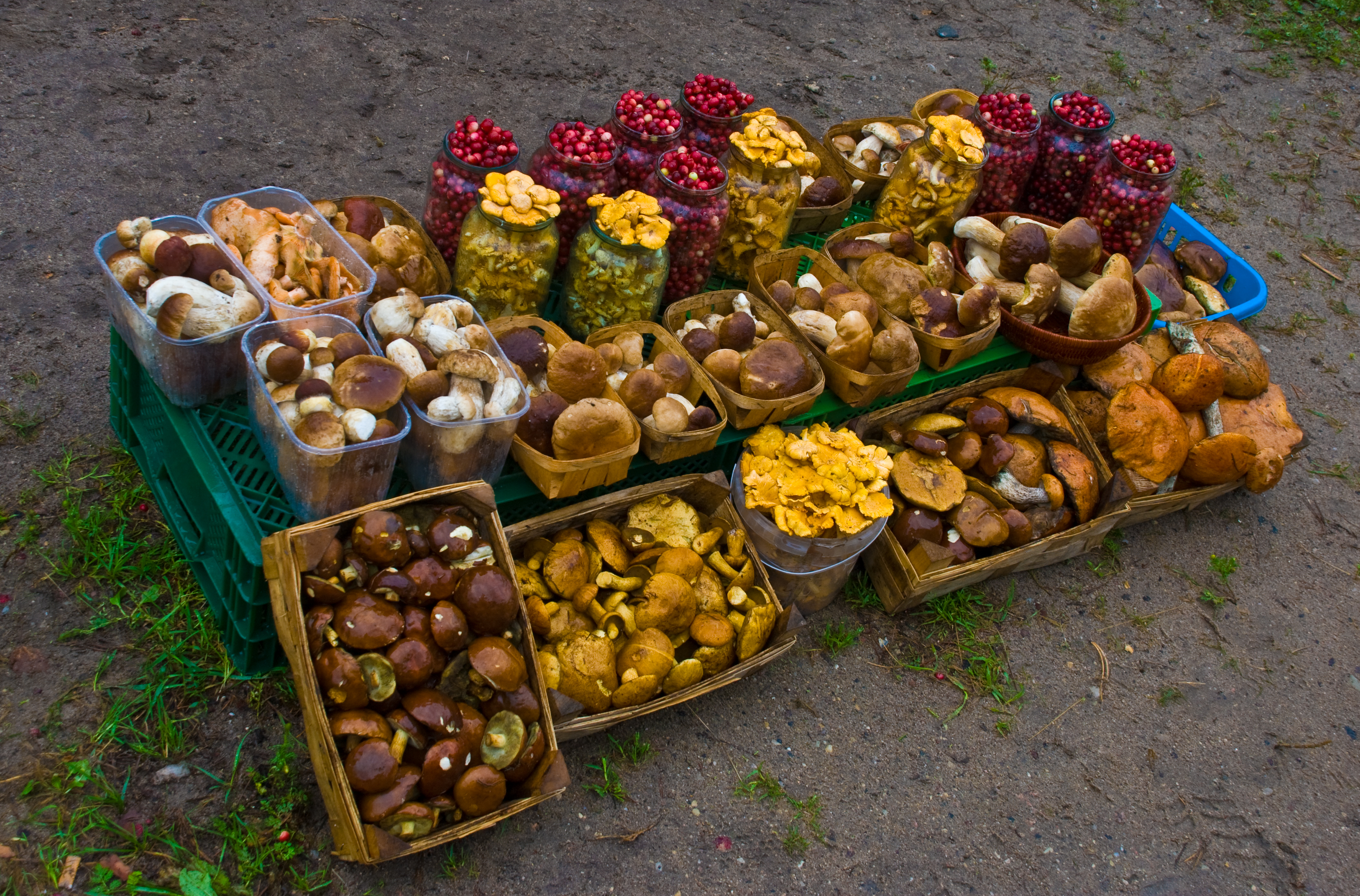
Mushrooms and berries collected in Lithuania

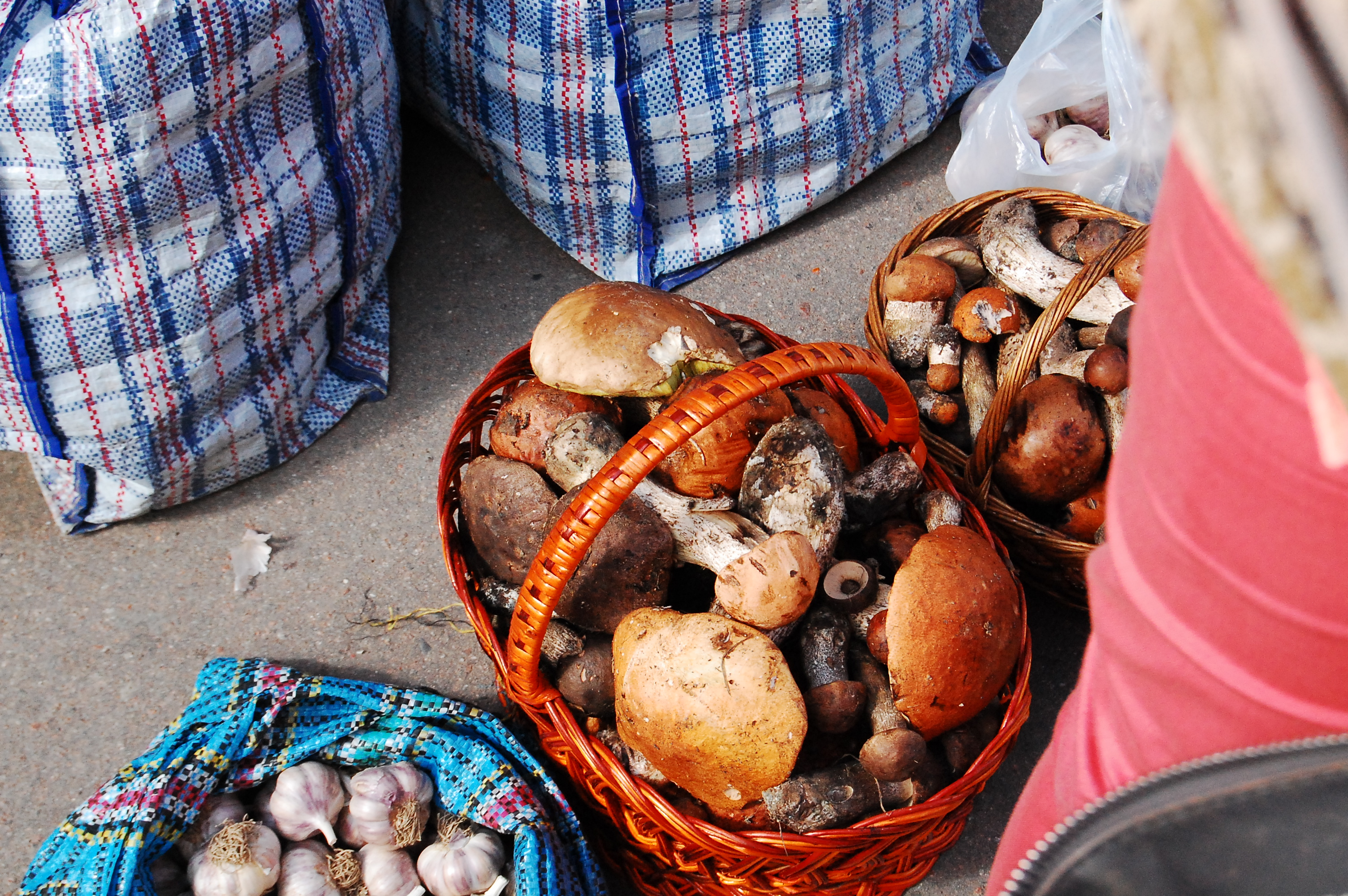
Forest-picked mushrooms at a Ukrainian market in Kolomyia

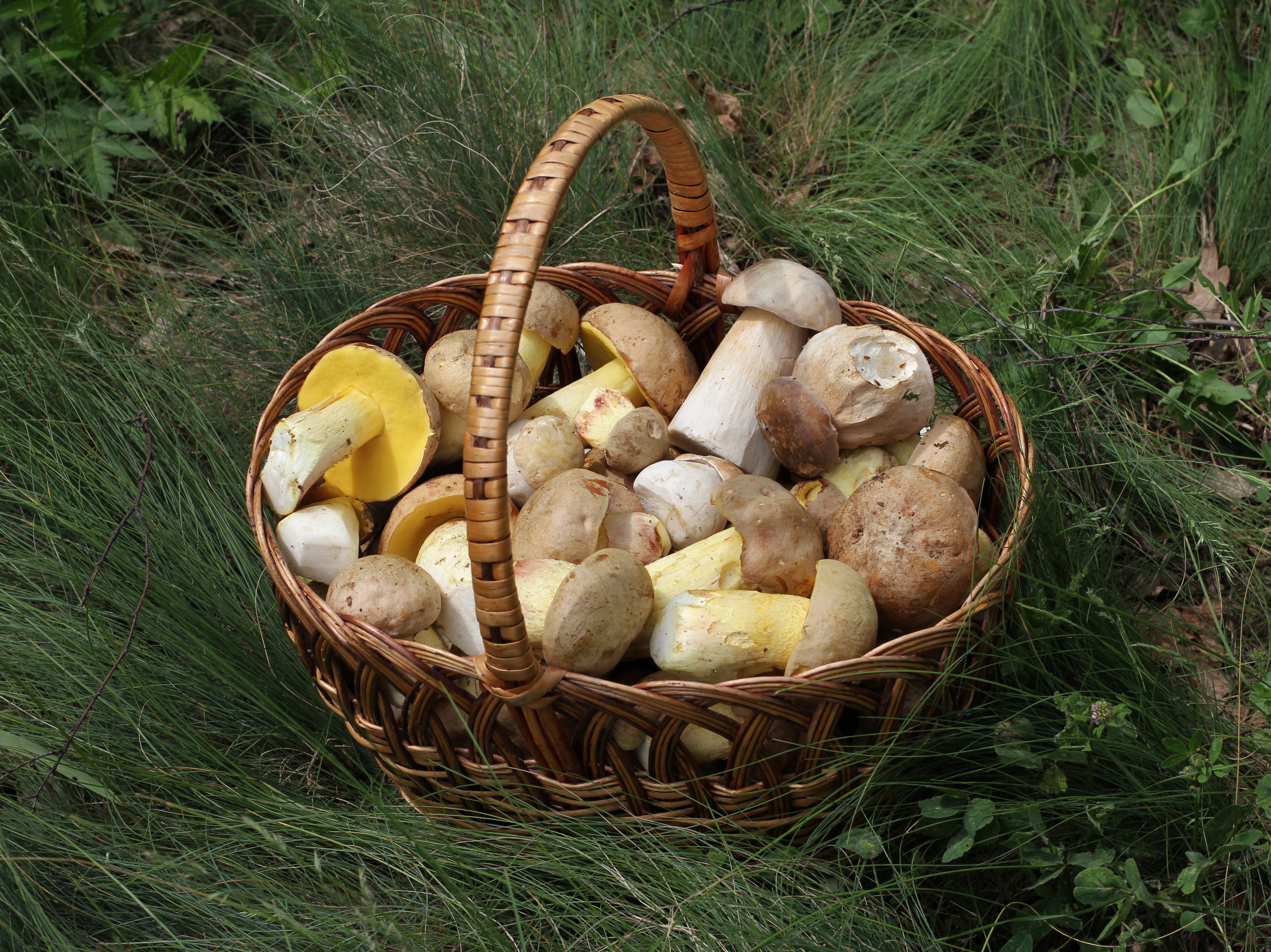
A basket of edible mushrooms from Ukraine

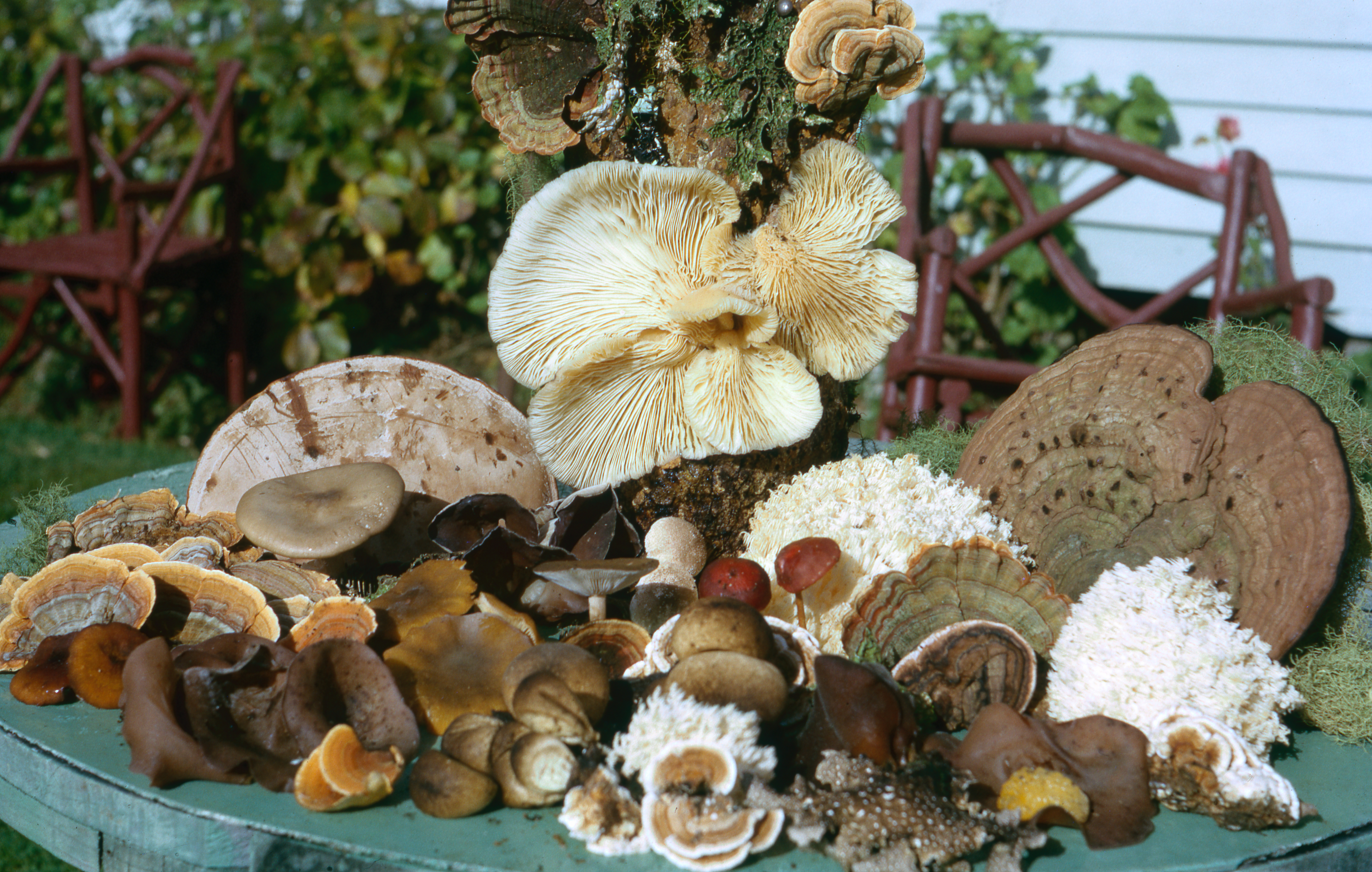
Mushrooms and other fungi collected in Australia

=== Festivals ===
The popularity of mushroom picking in some parts of the world has led to mushroom festivals. The festivals are usually between September and October, depending on the mushrooms available in a particular region. Festivals in the United States include:

- Boyne City, Michigan – Annual National Morel Mushroom Festival
- Mount Pisgah, Oregon – Mushroom Festival
- Madisonville, Texas – Texas Mushroom Festival
- Telluride, Colorado – Telluride Mushroom Festival

=== Radiation ===
Nuclear fallout from the Chernobyl disaster is an important issue concerning mushroom picking in Europe. Due to the wide spread of their mycelium, mushrooms tend to accumulate more radioactive caesium-137 than surrounding soil and other organisms. State agencies (e.g. Bellesrad in Belarus) monitor and analyze the degree of radionuclide accumulation in various wild species of plants and animals. In particular, Bellesrad claims that Svinushka (Paxillus spp.), Maslenok (Suillus spp.), Mohovik (Xerocomus spp.), and Horkushka (Lactarius rufus) are the worst ones in this respect. The safest one is Opyonok Osyenniy (Armillaria mellea). This is an issue not only in Poland, Belarus, Ukraine and Russia: the fallout also reached western Europe, and until recently the German government discouraged people gathering certain mushrooms.

== See also ==
- List of mushroom dishes
- Mushroom diet
