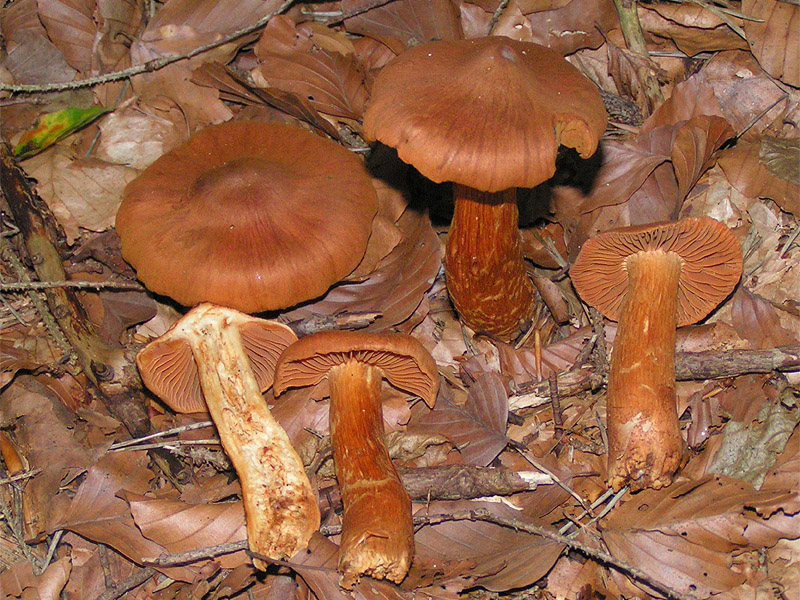
- Deadly webcap, Cortinarius rubellus
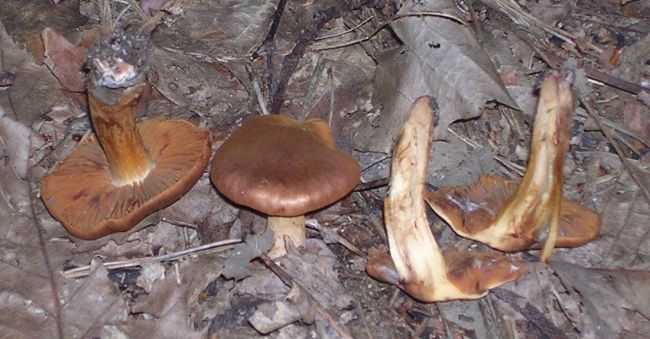
- Fool's webcap, Cortinarius orellanus

Scientific classification
- Kingdom: Fungi
- Division: Basidiomycota
- Class: Agaricomycetes
- Order: Agaricales
- Family: Cortinariaceae
- Genus: Cortinarius
- Species: C. rubellus

Binomial name
- Cortinarius rubellus Cooke

= Orellani =

Lethal webcaps

Orellani
- Mycological characteristics
- Gills on hymenium
- Cap is umbonate
- Hymenium is adnexed
- Stipe has a cortina
- Spore print is brown
- Ecology is mycorrhizal
- Edibility is deadly

The Orellani are a group of seven related species in the genus Cortinarius that have been classified as a section of the subgenus Leprocybe or a subgenus in their own right. They are among world's most poisonous mushrooms as they contain the highly toxic compound orellanine. The best-known species are the deadly webcap (Cortinarius rubellus, formerly also known as C. speciosissimus or C. orellanoides) and the fool's webcap, C. orellanus.

The mushrooms' characteristics are quite common, making them difficult to identify, which often leads to fatal poisonings. Young examples of the species often have a veil between the cap of the mushroom and the stem. This veil looks like a cobweb, hence the name. The veil however partially or completely disappears in older specimens. Some other characteristics for each of the mushrooms are given below.

== Descriptions ==
=== Deadly webcap (Cortinarius rubellus) ===
Spore color: Rusty brown to orange
Cap: 3–7 cm rusty brown to orange. Often has a steeper and darker colored elevation at the top of the cap, but this varies greatly from specimen to specimen
Gills: Wide gaps between the gills which can be, but are not necessarily, connected to the stem
Location: Rare, but common in temperate parts of northern Europe. Has been encountered as far north as Finnish Lapland.
Habitat: pine woods with acidic soil
Other details: Young specimens contain a pale web between the cap and the stem. Sometimes parts of this web can be seen as a yellow ring on the stem or at the edge of the cap. The fruiting body of the mushroom blossoms from mid-summer to late autumn.

Cortinarius rainierensis, described in 1950 by Alex H. Smith and Daniel Elliot Stuntz from material collected Mount Rainier National Park, is a synonym.

=== Fool's webcap (Cortinarius orellanus) ===
Spore color: Rusty brown to orange
Cap: 3–8.5 cm (1.2–3.3 in), concave
Gills: Similar to those of the deadly webcap
Location: Common throughout Europe, rare in the northern parts of Europe. Has been observed as far north as southern Norway
Habitat: In forests, around trees where the soil is alkaline or acidic
Other details: Young specimens of the fool's webcap also contain a web between the cap and the stem that partially or completely disappears as the specimen ages.

== Toxicity ==
The deadly webcap and the fool's webcap both contain the toxin orellanine and orellin, orellinin and cortinarin A, B, and C. A characteristic of orellanine poisoning is the long latency; the first symptoms usually don't appear until 2–3 days after ingestion and can in some cases take as long as 3 weeks. The first symptoms of orellanine poisoning are similar to the common flu (nausea, vomiting, stomach pains, headaches, etc.). These symptoms are followed by early stages of kidney failure (immense thirst, frequent urination, pain on and around the kidneys), and eventually decreased or nonexistent urine output and other symptoms of kidney failure occur. If left untreated, death will follow. There is no known antidote against orellanine poisoning, but early hospitalization and treatment can sometimes prevent serious injuries and usually prevent death. If orellanine poisoning is suspected, emergency medical attention is advised.

Both of these mushrooms can be confused with each other and many incidents of mushroom poisoning have occurred where inexperienced mushroom hunters have confused these mushrooms with edible mushrooms, such as the chanterelle, or hallucinogenic mushrooms. Extreme care should be taken when picking mushrooms like the cleaned funnel chanterelles as these mushrooms share the same habitat as the deadly webcap and the fool's webcap.

The LD_{50} of orellanine in mice is 12-20 mg/kg body weight. From cases of orellanine-related mushroom poisoning in humans it seems that the lethal dose for humans is considerably lower.

Several more mushrooms in the genus Cortinarius are suspected to contain orellanine or other deadly toxins. Among them are C. callisteus and C. limonius.

=== Notable poisonings ===
In Poland in the 1950s there was a small epidemic where over 100 people became ill. What caused the illness remained a mystery until 1957 when Polish physician Stanisław Grzymala discovered that everyone suffering from the illness, which by then had claimed eleven lives, had eaten the mushroom Cortinarius orellanus.

British author Nicholas Evans, his wife Charlotte Gordon Cumming, and two other relatives were accidentally poisoned in September 2008 after consuming C. rubellus and/or C. speciosissimus that they gathered on holiday. Although the poisoning was non-lethal, Evans and the others suffered severe renal damage and had to undergo kidney dialysis. All four victims were informed that they would require kidney transplants in the future. Several years later, Evans received a kidney donated by his daughter, Lauren.

== See also ==
- List of deadly fungi
- Mushroom hunting
- Mushroom poisoning
