= Bunhouse =

2021 video game

- Developer: Reky Studios
- Publisher: Digerati Distribution
- Composer: Patrick Gauthier
- Platforms: Windows; Nintendo Switch; PlayStation 5; PlayStation 4; Xbox Series X; Xbox One
- Release: Windows; 19 October 2021; Nintendo Switch; 18 May 2023; Xbox Series X, Xbox One, PlayStation 4, PlayStation 5; 12 April 2024
- Genre: Virtual life
- Mode: Co-op mode; single-player

Bunhouse is a 2021 gardening video game featuring rabbits. It was developed by Greenville, South Carolina-based studio Reky Studios and published by Digerati Distribution following a successful Kickstarter campaign that met multiple stretch goals, with the initial launch on Windows via Steam occurring October 19, 2021. The game released on Nintendo Switch on May 18, 2023, and on Xbox, PlayStation 4, and PlayStayion 5 on April 12, 2024. Reky Studios went on to develop Cinnabunny, a game about running a bakery in a community of rabbits, in 2024. The game is not directly related to Bunhouse in story or characters. Contributors to Cinnabunny's Kickstarter were allowed to submit fur pattern designs based on their own pet rabbits for game characters.

== Gameplay ==
In Bunhouse, players take control of anthropomorphized rabbits running a plant nursery. Plants are grown by filling a planter with soil, dropping in seeds, and watering the soil until it reaches the appropriate moisture level. After some time, a plant will grow that can be sold to afford more seeds and upgrades to the greenhouse and its amenities. Outside of the nursery, there is a forest and river where activities like foraging for mushrooms and fishing are possible.

== Reception ==
Reception

Aggregate score
| Aggregator | Score |
|---|---|
| OpenCritic | 57% recommend |

Bunhouse received middling scores from reviewers. Chloe Osborn gave it 3 out of 5 stars in a review for Rapid Reviews UK, and Daniel Waite gave it a score out of six out of ten. Peggy Doyle reviewed the game for Xbox Addict and cited a lack of content and constant glitches in her 65 out of 100 score. Tyler Wilde put forth that some elements could be likened to a horror game in his review for PC Gamer, though no intentional horror aspects are present in the game. Writing for Siliconera, Elliot Gostick described the concept as interesting but found the blurry visual style and awkward character movement frustrating.
