= Cortinarius boulderensis =

Scientific classification
- Kingdom: Fungi
- Division: Basidiomycota
- Class: Agaricomycetes
- Order: Agaricales
- Family: Cortinariaceae
- Genus: Cortinarius
- Species: C. boulderensis

Binomial name
- Cortinarius boulderensis A.H. Sm.

Species of fungus

Cortinarius boulderensis Mycological characteristics
- Gills on hymenium
- Cap is conical or campanulate
- Hymenium is adnexed
- Stipe has a cortina
- Spore print is reddish-brown
- Ecology is mycorrhizal
- Edibility is unknown

Cortinarius boulderensis, commonly known as the cinnamon-ringed webcap, is a species of mushroom in the family Cortinariaceae.

== Description ==
The cap of Cortinarius boulderensis starts out conical, before sometimes becoming campanulate or almost flat. It is about 1.5-4 centimeters in diameter and brown in color. The gills start out grayish, before becoming brown in age. The stipe is about 3-8 centimeters long and 3-7 millimeters wide. It is hollow at the base. A cortina is present. The spore print is rusty brown. There is an orange band on the stipe.

== Habitat and ecology ==
Cortinarius boulderensis is found in coniferous forests. It is more commonly found in old-growth forests, and fruits during autumn.
