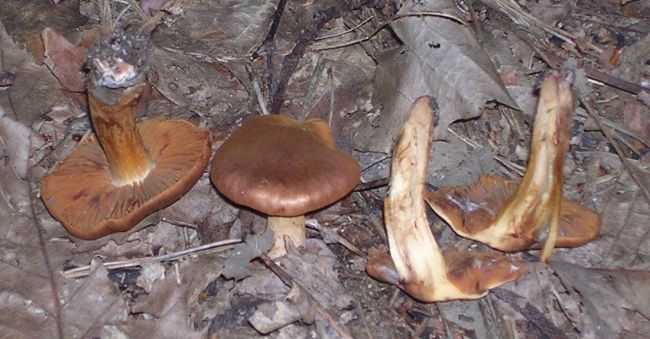

Scientific classification
- Kingdom: Fungi
- Division: Basidiomycota
- Class: Agaricomycetes
- Order: Agaricales
- Family: Cortinariaceae
- Genus: Cortinarius
- Species: C. orellanus

Binomial name
- Cortinarius orellanus Fries, 1838

Synonyms
- Cortinarius rutilans Quél. Dermocybe orellana (Fr.) Ricken

= Cortinarius orellanus =

Species of fungus

Cortinarius orellanus
- Mycological characteristics
- Gills on hymenium
- Cap is flat
- Hymenium is adnate
- Stipe has a ring
- Spore print is reddish-brown
- Ecology is mycorrhizal
- Edibility is deadly

Cortinarius orellanus, commonly known as the fool's webcap or fools webcap, is a species of deadly fungus in the family Cortinariaceae native to Europe. Within the genus it belongs to a group known as the Orellani, all of which are highly toxic—eating them results in kidney failure, which is often irreversible. The mushroom is generally tan to brown all over.

== Taxonomy ==
Cortinarius orellanus was first described by Swedish mycologist Elias Magnus Fries in his 1838 book Epicrisis Systematis Mycologici seu Synopsis Hymenomycetum. It is one of seven highly toxic species that make up the orellani, a subgenus within genus Cortinarius.

== Description ==
Cortinarius orellanus has a concave cap of 3 to 6 centimetres (1 1/4 to 2 1/4 in) diameter, though rare specimens reach 8 centimetres (3 1/4 in) across. The cap flattens with age. In colour, it is an orange-brown, and is covered in fine, fibrous scales but becomes smooth with age. The cap surface turns black with potassium hydroxide. The thick gills are light ochre-coloured, changing to a rust-brown with age as the spores mature. They have an adnate or sinuate connection to the stipe. The stipe is 4 to 9 centimetres (1 1/2 to 3 1/2 in) tall, and 1 to 2 centimetres (3/8 to 3/4 in) thick with a tapering base. It is the same colour or slightly paler than the cap, and is yellowish at the top. There are occasionally fragments of the pale yellow veil (cortina) attached to its lower half. The firm flesh is pale ochre. It smells slightly of radishes when cut and has no strong taste.

== Distribution and habitat ==
Cortinarius orellanus occurs in central and eastern Europe (Poland, Czech Republic, Slovakia), though is rare in Germany. It is occasionally found in southern Britain. It grows in deciduous forests under beech, hornbeam and oak, often near pine trees.

== Toxicity ==
The danger of C. orellanus was uncovered in 1957, after (in 1952) 102 people fell ill after eating it in Bydgoszcz, Poland. Eleven of the victims died. Since then, cases of poisoning have been recorded in France, Switzerland, and Germany. In 1997, four people suffered renal toxicity after mistaking C. orellanus for the edible and prized chanterelle in Austria, where wild mushroom picking is popular.

The relevant toxin is orellanine.

One important feature of Cortinarius orellanus's natural history is its toxicity, which is linked to the presence of orellanine, a strong nephrotoxin. The research publications provide strong evidence for this claim, especially the one by Judge et al. (2010) that describes cases of chronic renal failure brought on by consumption of orellanine-containing Cortinarius mushrooms.

== See also ==
- List of deadly fungus species
