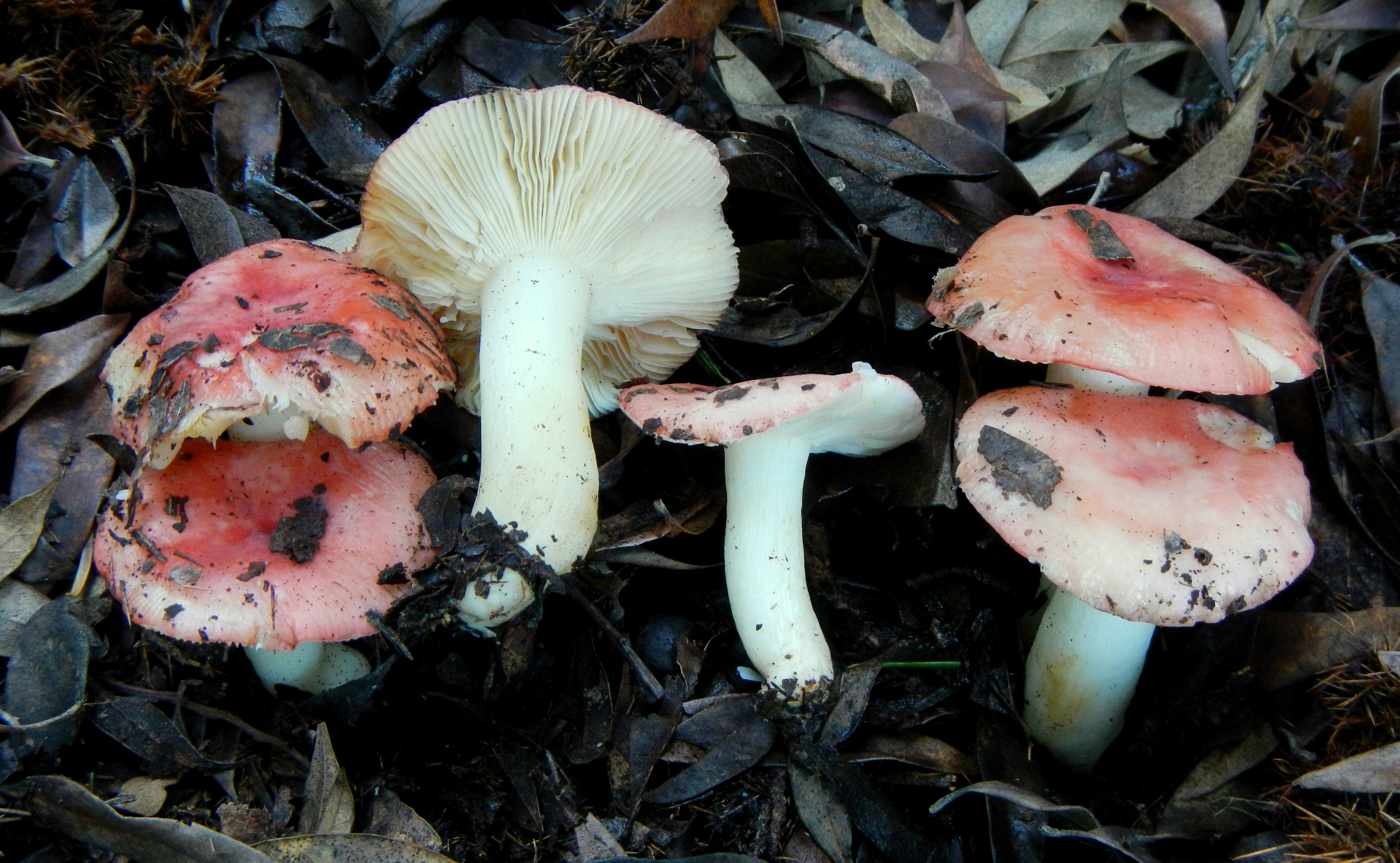

Scientific classification
- Domain: Eukaryota
- Kingdom: Fungi
- Division: Basidiomycota
- Class: Agaricomycetes
- Order: Russulales
- Family: Russulaceae
- Genus: Russula
- Species: R. silvicola

Binomial name
- Russula silvicola Shaffer (1975)

= Russula silvicola =

Species of fungus

Russula silvicola is a species of agaric fungus in the family Russulaceae. Found in North America, it was described as new to science in 1975. It is considered inedible. It has a strong peppery flavor.

== See also ==
- List of Russula species
