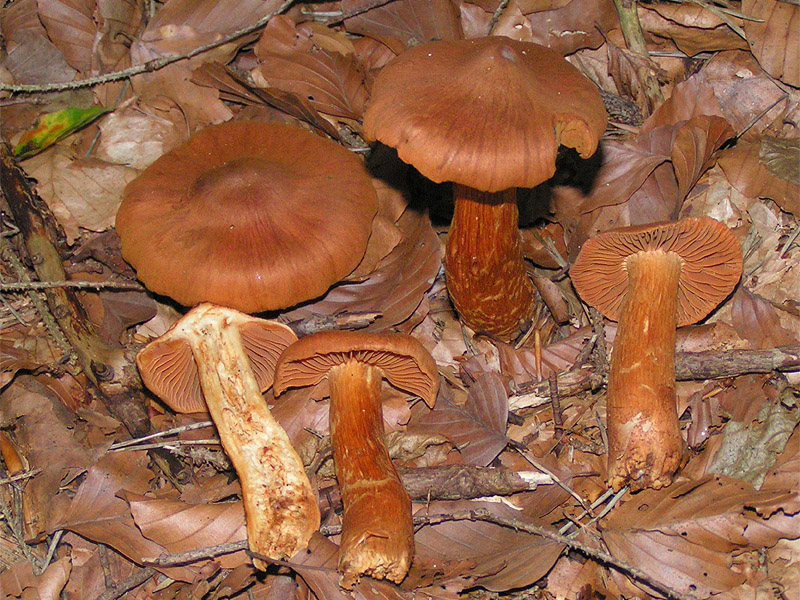

Scientific classification
- Kingdom: Fungi
- Division: Basidiomycota
- Class: Agaricomycetes
- Order: Agaricales
- Family: Cortinariaceae
- Genus: Cortinarius
- Species: C. rubellus

Binomial name
- Cortinarius rubellus Cooke, 1887

Synonyms
- Cortinarius orellanoides Rob. Henry; Cortinarius speciosissimus Kühner & Romagn. Cortinarius rainierensis Dermocybe orellanoides (Rob. Henry) M.M. Moser

= Cortinarius rubellus =

Species of fungus

Cortinarius rubellus
- Mycological characteristics
- Gills on hymenium
- Cap is conical or convex
- Hymenium is adnate
- Stipe is bare
- Spore print is cream to yellow
- Ecology is mycorrhizal
- Edibility is deadly

Cortinarius rubellus, commonly known as the deadly webcap, is a species of fungus in the family Cortinariaceae, native to high-latitude temperate to subalpine forests of Eurasia and North America. Within the genus it belongs to a group known as the Orellani, all of which are highly toxic. Eating them results in kidney failure, which is often irreversible. The mushroom is generally tan to brown all over, with a conical to convex cap 2.5 to 8 centimetres (1 to 3 1/4 in) in diameter, adnate gills and a 5.5 to 11 cm (2 1/4 to 4 1/4 in) tall stipe.

== Taxonomy ==
British naturalist Mordecai Cubitt Cooke described Cortinarius rubellus in 1887 from material collected by a Dr. Carlyle at Orton Moss near Carlisle, Cumbria. The name was rarely used before 1980, however. Cortinarius orellanoides was described by Henry in 1937 from mushrooms growing under bracken (Pteridium aquilinum) and beech in France, while Robert Kühner and Henri Romagnesi described C. speciosissimus (initially C. speciosus, but that name had already been given to another species of webcap) from mushrooms growing in moss among Vaccinium in pine and spruce forests of the French and Swiss Jura. Cortinarius rainierensis, described in 1950 by Alex H. Smith and Daniel Elliot Stuntz from material collected in Mount Rainier National Park in the United States, is a synonym. Klaus Høiland reviewed material of C. orellanoides and C. speciosissimus and determined that the mushrooms and spores were identical. The only difference was that C. orellanoides grew in beech and C. speciosissimus preferred conifers, yet he had also found the latter species growing under beech in Norway. He concluded the name should be C. orellanoides, as that was the older name. Høiland and others had noted that C. rubellus was likely to be the same species as well. Gasparini queried this, however, because in Cooke's original illustrations of C. rubellus, he noted that the spores were drawn as triangular or fig-shaped and were not consistent with descriptions of C. orellanoides or C. speciosissimus.

Cortinarius rubellus is one of seven highly toxic species that make up the orellani, a subgenus within genus Cortinarius. In 2007, Bruno Gasparini proposed conserving the name C. speciosissimus against the other names as it had been chiefly known by this name between 1953 and 1980, and some doubts existed over which names were legitimate. Both C. rubellus and C. orellanoides lacked a type specimen and there was a possibility that the description of C. rubellus could have also applied to Cortinarius morrisii. There was no consensus on the proposal as of 2022.

== Description ==
Cortinarius rubellus has a conical to convex (partly flattening to umbonate with maturity) cap of 2.5 to 8 centimetres (1 to 3 1/4 in) diameter. In colour, it is a tawny to date brown with paler margins, and is covered in fine, fibrous scales. The gills are ochre- or caramel-coloured, changing to a deeper brown with age as the spores mature. They have an adnate connection to the stipe. The stipe is 5.5 to 11 centimetres (2 1/4 to 4 1/4 in) tall, and 0.5 to 1.5 centimetres (1/4 to 5/8 in) thick with a bulbous base. It is the same colour or slightly paler than the cap, and can have yellow fragments of the veil (cortina) attached to its lower half. The flesh is cream or pale yellow, but more tan below the pileipellis and in the stem base. It smells slightly of radishes and has no strong taste.

== Distribution and habitat ==
Cortinarius rubellus has been recorded in high-latitude temperate to subalpine forests throughout the northern hemisphere, including subalpine conifer forest in the Yatsugatake Mountains in Yamanashi Prefecture, central Japan. In North America, it is found in British Columbia and western Washington, particularly Mount Rainier National Park. C. rubellus occurs in Scandinavia and also occurs in the north of the British Isles, generally in wet areas of conifer or mixed conifer and broadleaf woodlands, though it is uncommon.

== Toxicity ==
Cortinarius rubellus contains orellanine, a powerful mycotoxin. The danger of poisoning was first recognized in 1972 in Finland, where four cases had occurred, two of which resulted in permanent kidney failure. In 1979, three people on holiday in near Inverness were poisoned, after mistaking it for the chanterelle. Two of the three required kidney transplants. Twenty-two people were poisoned between 1979 and 1993 in Sweden, nine of whom required a kidney transplant following end stage kidney failure (ESRF). Among the edible species they mistook the mushroom for were Craterellus tubaeformis and Hygrophorus species as well as chanterelles. The edible Craterellus tubaeformis can be distinguished by its funnel-shaped cap and ridges on the cap's underside rather than gills. In 1996, one person in Austria ate it while looking for magic mushrooms.

Nicholas Evans, author of The Horse Whisperer, his wife Charlotte Gordon Cumming, and two other relatives were accidentally poisoned in September 2008 after consuming deadly webcaps that they gathered on holiday. Evans had assumed they were ceps but overlooked that the mushrooms had gills rather than pores. All four victims were informed that they would require kidney transplants in the future. Several years later, Evans received a kidney donated by his daughter, Lauren. The other three eventually received transplants after some searching for donors, despite Charlotte having only eaten three mouthfuls of mushroom; they were instrumental in setting up the charity Give a Kidney.

== See also ==
- List of Cortinarius species
