= Mushroom poisoning =

Harmful effects from ingestion of toxic substances present in a mushroom

- Other names: Mycetism, mycetismus
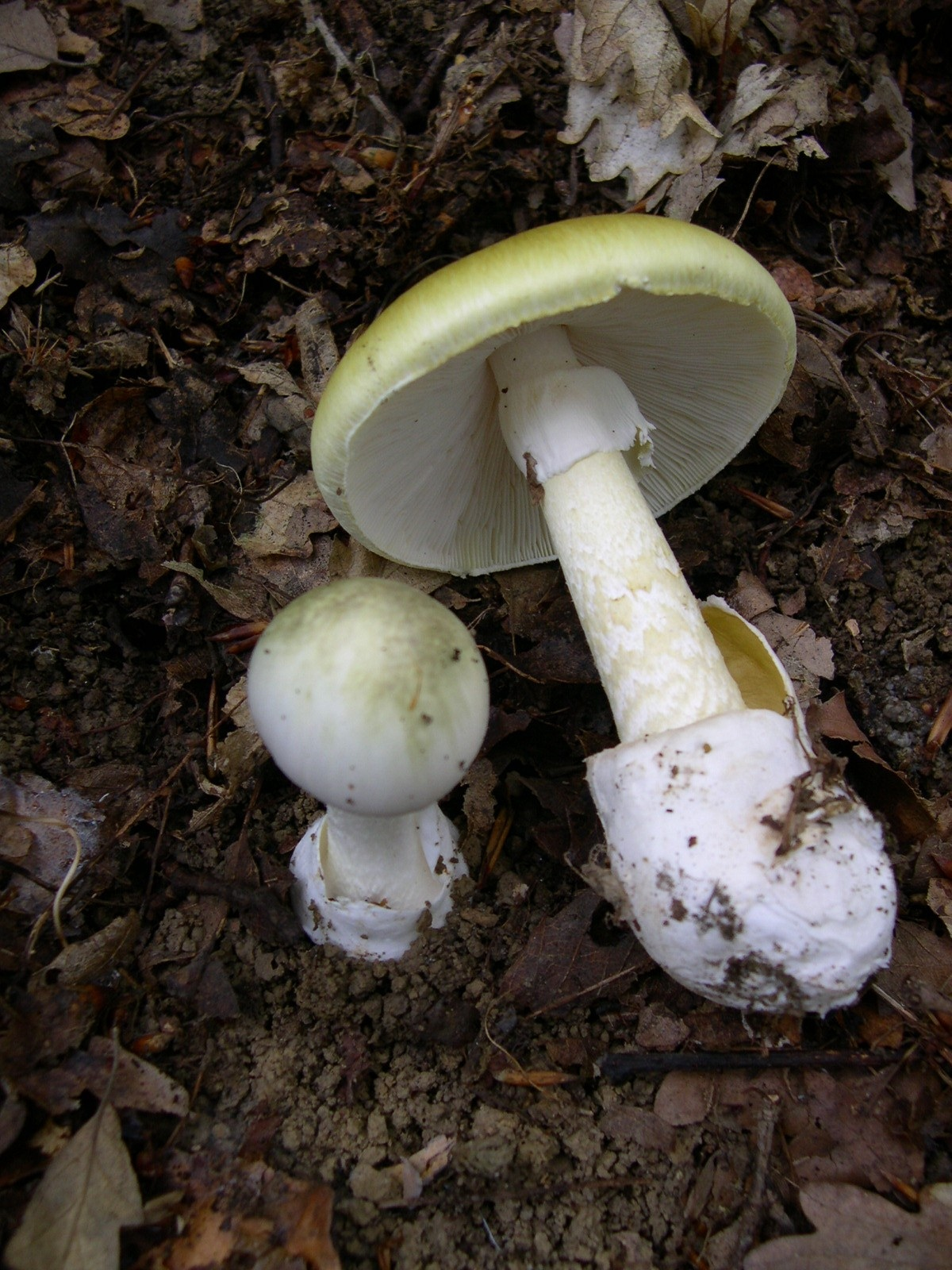
- Amanita phalloides accounts for the majority of fatal mushroom poisonings worldwide.
- Specialty: Emergency medicine, toxicology

Mushroom poisoning is poisoning resulting from the ingestion of toxic mushrooms. Symptoms can vary from slight gastrointestinal discomfort to death in about 10 days. Mushroom toxins are secondary metabolites produced by the fungus.

Mushroom poisoning is usually the result of ingestion of wild mushrooms after misidentification of a toxic mushroom as an edible species. The most common reason for this misidentification is a close resemblance in terms of color and general morphology of the toxic mushrooms species with edible species. To prevent mushroom poisoning, mushroom gatherers familiarize themselves with the mushrooms they intend to collect, as well as with any similar-looking toxic species. The safety of eating wild mushrooms may depend on methods of preparation for cooking. Some toxins, such as amatoxins, are thermostable and mushrooms containing such toxins will not be rendered safe to eat by cooking.

== Signs and symptoms ==
Poisonous mushrooms contain a variety of different toxins that can differ markedly in toxicity. Symptoms of mushroom poisoning may vary from gastric upset to organ failure resulting in death. Serious symptoms do not always occur immediately after eating, often not until the toxin attacks the kidney or liver, sometimes days or weeks later.

The most common consequence of mushroom poisoning is simply gastrointestinal upset. Most "poisonous" mushrooms contain gastrointestinal irritants that cause vomiting and diarrhea (sometimes requiring urgent care), but usually no long-term damage. However, there are a number of recognized mushroom toxins with specific, and sometimes deadly, effects:

Toxin	Toxicity	Effects
α-Amanitin	Deadly	Causes often fatal liver damage 1–3 days after ingestion. The principal toxin in the death cap.
Phallotoxin	Non-lethal	Causes extreme gastrointestinal upset. Found in various mushrooms.
Orellanine	Deadly	Redox cycler similar to paraquat. Causes kidney failure within three weeks after ingestion. Principal toxin in genus Cortinarius.
Muscarine	Non-lethal	Causes Cholinergic crisis. Found in various mushrooms. Antidote is atropine.
Monomethylhydrazine (MMH)	Deadly	Causes brain damage, seizures, gastrointestinal upset, and hemolysis. Metabolic poison. Principal toxin in genus Gyromitra. Antidote is large doses of intravenous pyridoxine hydrochloride.
Coprine	Non-lethal	Causes illness when consumed with alcohol. Principal toxin in genus Coprinus.
Ibotenic acid	Non-lethal	Excitotoxin. Principal toxin in Amanita muscaria, A. pantherina, and A. gemmata.
Muscimol	Non-lethal	Causes CNS depression and hallucinations. Principal toxin in Amanita muscaria, A. pantherina, and A. gemmata.
Arabitol	Non-lethal	Causes diarrhea in some people.
Bolesatine	Non-lethal	Causes gastrointestinal irritation, vomiting, nausea.
Ergotamine	Deadly	Affects the vascular system and can lead to loss of limbs and/or cardiac arrest. Found in genus Claviceps.

The period between ingestion and the onset of symptoms varies dramatically between toxins, some taking days to show symptoms identifiable as mushroom poisoning.

- α-Amanitin: For 6–12 hours, there are no symptoms. This is followed by a period of gastrointestinal upset (vomiting and profuse watery diarrhea). This stage is caused primarily by the phallotoxins and typically lasts 24 hours. At the end of this second stage is when severe liver damage begins. The damage may continue for another 2–3 days. Kidney damage can also occur. Some patients will require a liver transplant. Amatoxins are found in some mushrooms in the genus Amanita, but are also found in some species of Galerina and Lepiota. Overall, mortality is between 10 and 15 percent. Recently, Silybum marianum or blessed milk thistle has been shown to protect the liver from amanita toxins and promote regrowth of damaged cells.
- Orellanine: This toxin generally causes no symptoms for 3–20 days after ingestion. Typically around day 11, the process of kidney failure begins, and is usually symptomatic by day 20. These symptoms can include pain in the area of the kidneys, thirst, vomiting, headache, and fatigue. A few species in the very large genus Cortinarius contain this toxin. People having eaten mushrooms containing orellanine may experience early symptoms as well, because the mushrooms often contain other toxins in addition to orellanine. A related toxin that causes similar symptoms but within 3–6 days has been isolated from Amanita smithiana and some other related toxic Amanitas.
- Muscarine: Muscarine stimulates the muscarinic receptors of the nerves and muscles. Symptoms include sweating, salivation, tears, blurred vision, palpitations, and, in high doses, respiratory failure. Muscarine is found in mushrooms of the genus Omphalotus, notably the jack o' Lantern mushrooms. It is also found in A. muscaria, although it is now known that the main effect of this mushroom is caused by ibotenic acid. Muscarine can also be found in some Inocybe species and Clitocybe species, in particular Clitocybe dealbata, and some red-pored Boletes.
- Gyromitrin: Stomach acids convert gyromitrin to monomethylhydrazine (MMH). It affects multiple body systems. It blocks the important neurotransmitter GABA, leading to stupor, delirium, muscle cramps, loss of coordination, tremors, and/or seizures. It causes severe gastrointestinal irritation, leading to vomiting and diarrhea. In some cases, liver failure has been reported. It can also cause red blood cells to break down, leading to jaundice, kidney failure, and signs of anemia. It is found in mushrooms of the genus Gyromitra. A gyromitrin-like compound has also been identified in mushrooms of the genus Verpa.
- Coprine: Coprine is metabolized to a chemical that resembles disulfiram. It inhibits aldehyde dehydrogenase (ALDH), which, in general, causes no harm, unless the person has alcohol in their bloodstream while ALDH is inhibited. This can happen if alcohol is ingested shortly before or up to a few days after eating the mushrooms. In that case, the alcohol cannot be completely metabolized, and the person will experience flushed skin, vomiting, headache, dizziness, weakness, apprehension, confusion, palpitations, and sometimes trouble to breathe. Coprine is found mainly in mushrooms of the genus Coprinus, although similar effects have been noted after ingestion of Clitocybe clavipes.
- Ibotenic acid: Decarboxylates into muscimol upon ingestion. The effects of muscimol vary, but nausea and vomiting are common. Confusion, euphoria, or sleepiness are possible. Loss of muscular coordination, sweating, and chills are likely. Some people experience visual distortions, a feeling of strength, or delusions. Symptoms normally appear after 30 minutes to 2 hours and last for several hours. A. muscaria, the "Alice in Wonderland" mushroom, is known for the hallucinatory experiences caused by muscimol, but A. pantherina and A. gemmata also contain the same compound. While normally self-limiting, fatalities have been associated with A. pantherina, and consumption of a large number of any of these mushrooms is likely to be dangerous.
- Arabitol: A sugar alcohol, similar to mannitol, which causes no harm in most people but causes gastrointestinal irritation in some. It is found in small amounts in oyster mushrooms, and considerable amounts in Suillus species and Hygrophoropsis aurantiaca (the "false chanterelle").

== Causes ==
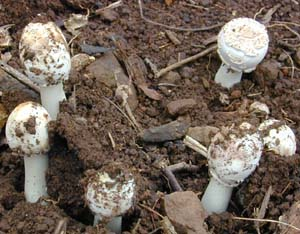
Immature, possibly poisonous, Amanita mushrooms

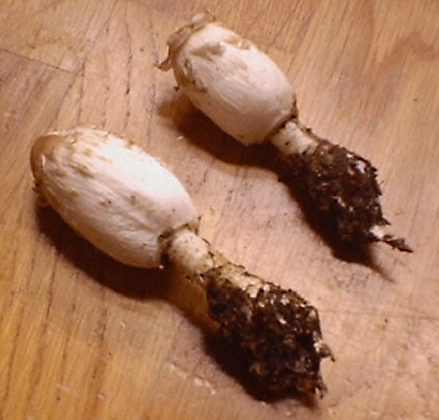
Edible shaggy mane Coprinus comatus mushrooms

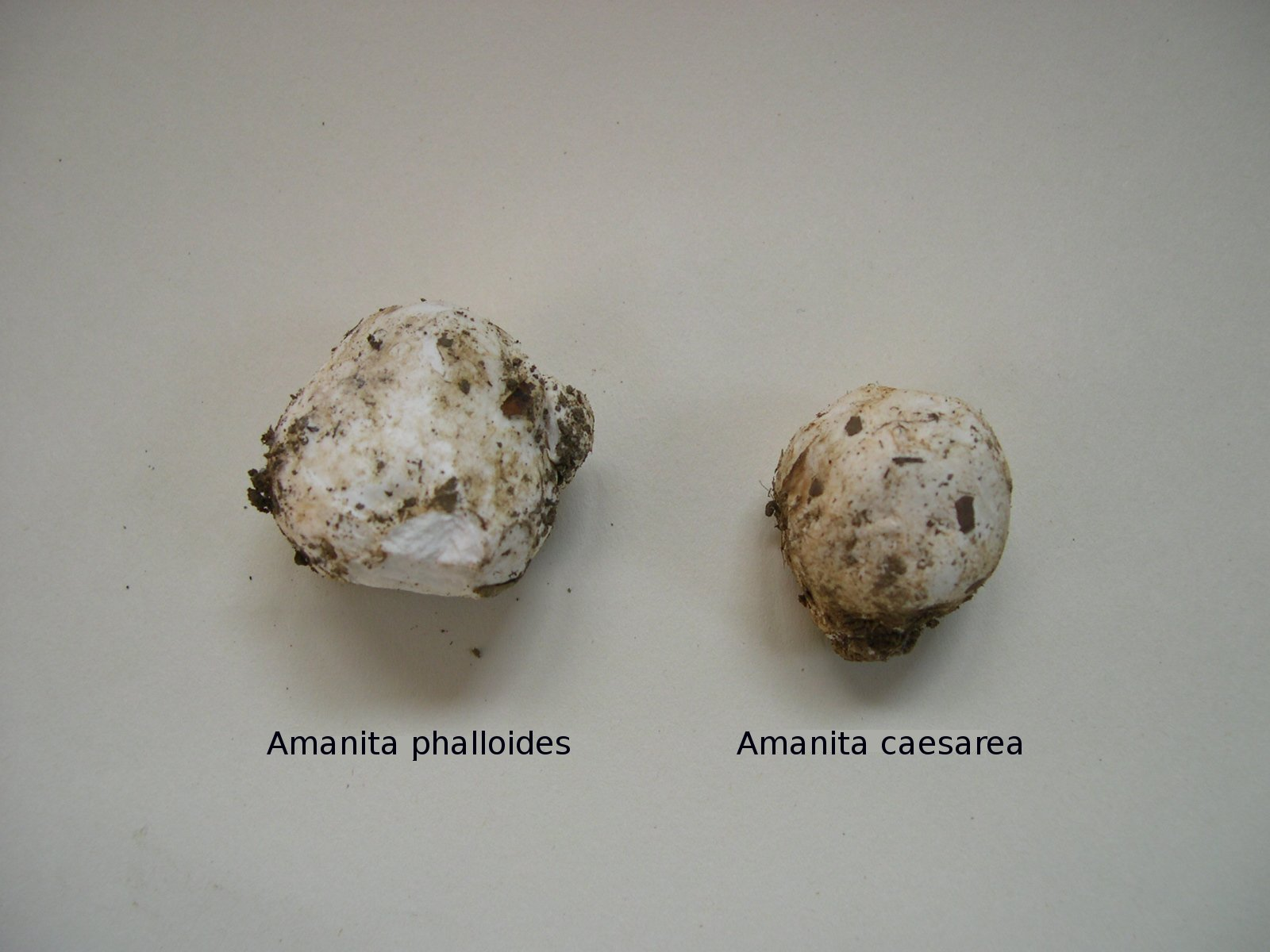
Two examples of immature Amanitas, one deadly and one edible

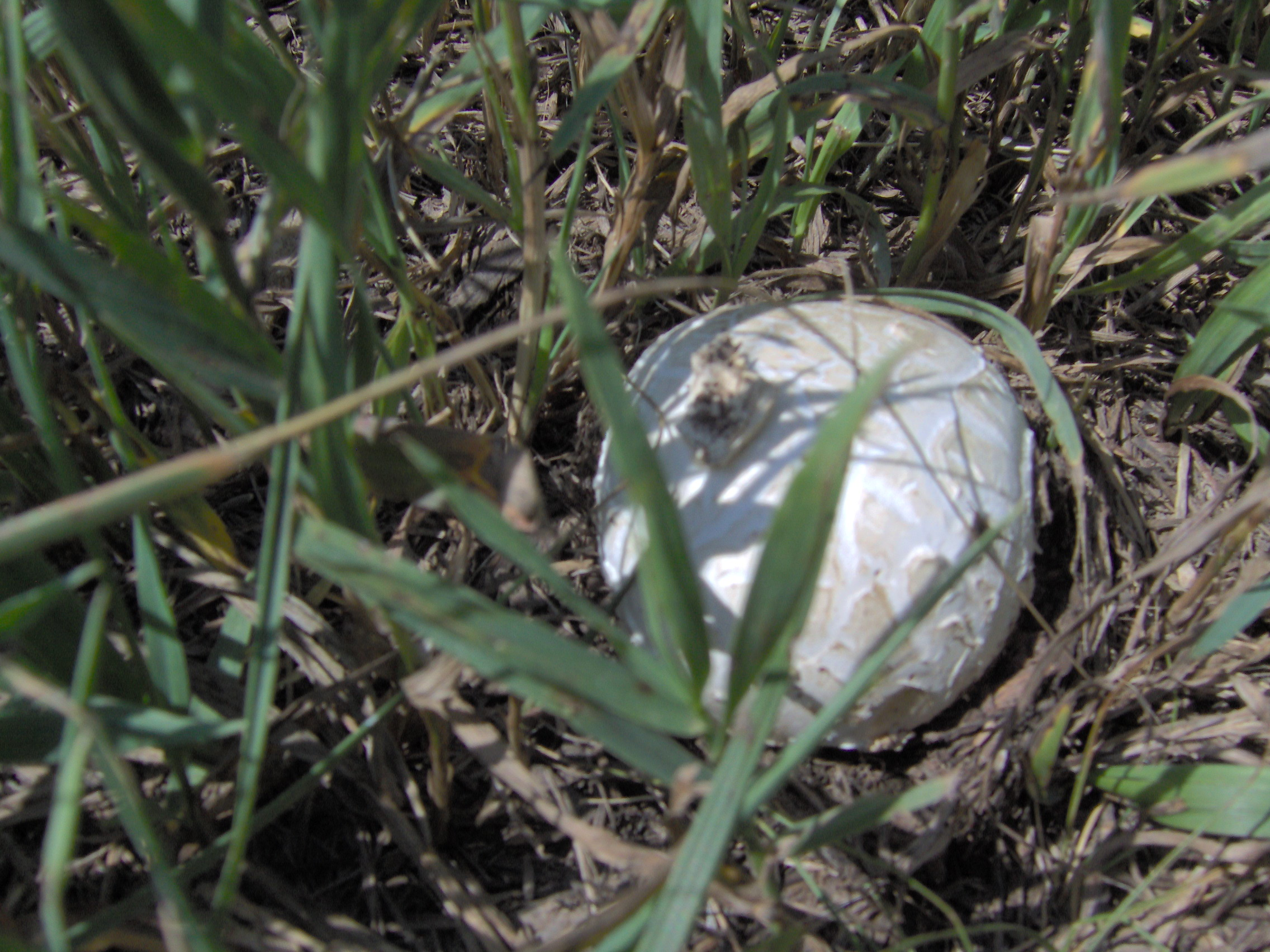
An edible puffball which closely resembles the immature Amanitas

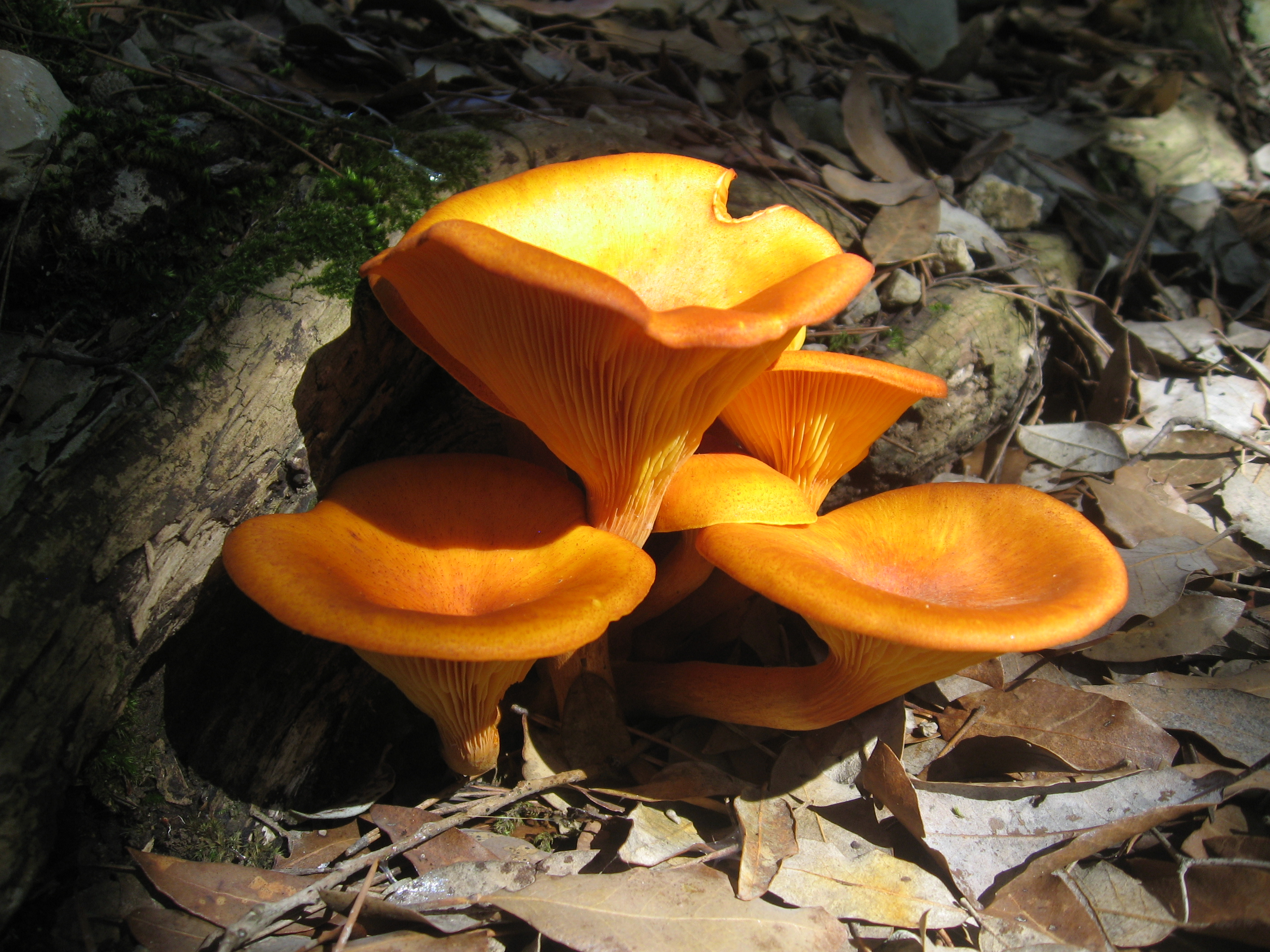
Jack-O-Lantern, a poisonous mushroom sometimes mistaken for a chanterelle

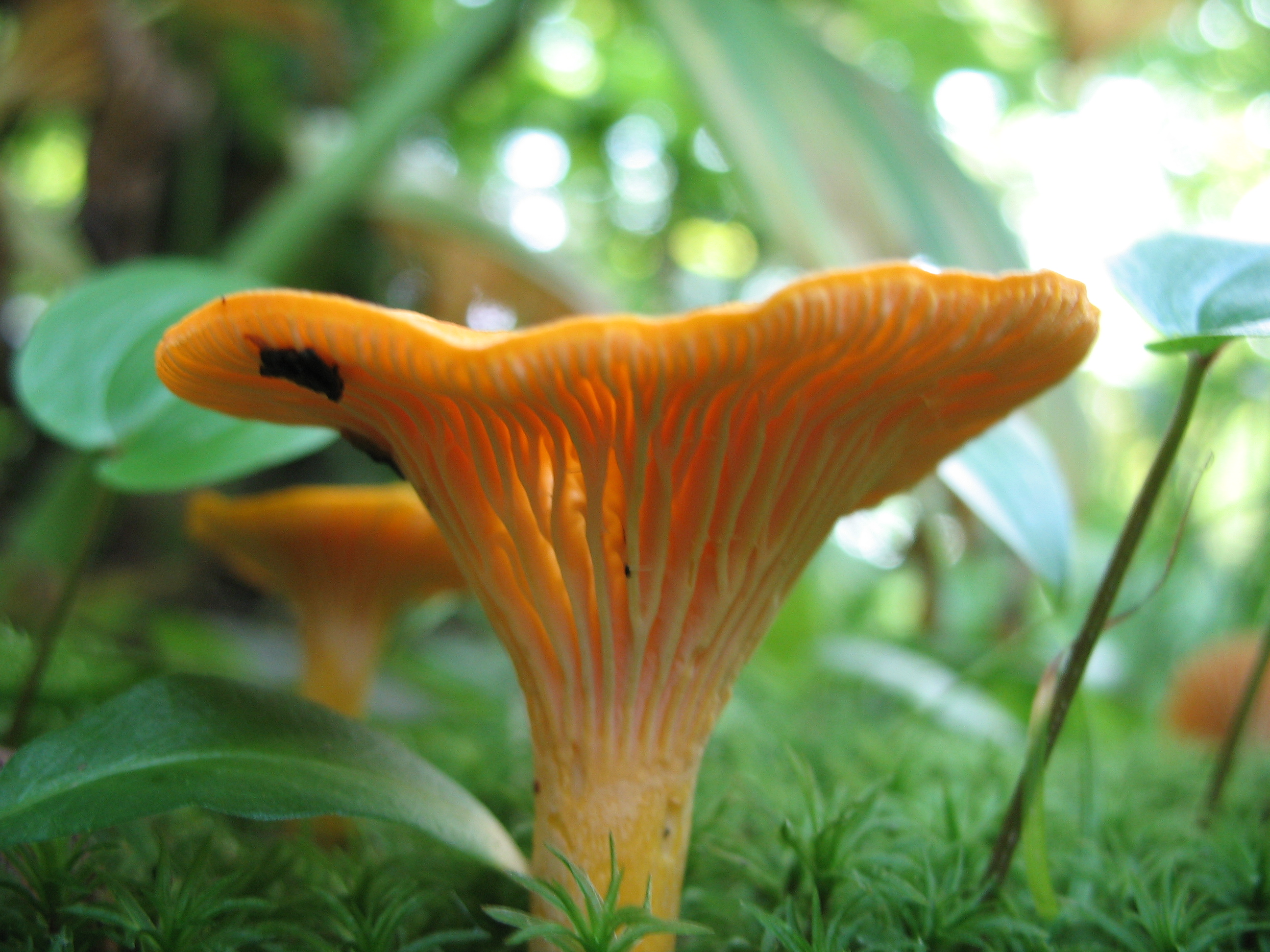
"Chanterelle", edible

New species of fungi are continuing to be discovered, with an estimated number of 800 new species registered annually. This, added to the fact that many investigations have recently reclassified some species of mushrooms from edible to poisonous has made older classifications insufficient at describing what now is known about the different species of fungi that are harmful to humans. It is now thought that of the approximately 100,000 known fungi species found worldwide, about 100 of them are poisonous to humans. However, by far the majority of mushroom poisonings are not fatal, and the majority of fatal poisonings are attributable to the Amanita phalloides mushroom.

A majority of these cases are due to mistaken identity. This is a common occurrence with A. phalloides in particular, due to its resemblance to the Asian paddy-straw mushroom, Volvariella volvacea. Both are light-colored and covered with a universal veil when young.

Amanitas can be mistaken for other species, as well, in particular when immature. On at least one occasion they have been mistaken for Coprinus comatus. In this case, the victim had some limited experience in identifying mushrooms, but did not take the time to correctly identify these particular mushrooms until after he began to experience symptoms of mushroom poisoning.

The author of Mushrooms Demystified, David Arora cautions puffball-hunters to beware of Amanita "eggs", which are Amanitas still entirely encased in their universal veil. Amanitas at this stage are difficult to distinguish from puffballs. Foragers are encouraged to always cut the fruiting bodies of suspected puffballs in half, as this will reveal the outline of a developing Amanita should it be present within the structure.

A majority of mushroom poisonings, in general, are the result of small children, especially toddlers in the "grazing" stage, ingesting mushrooms found on the lawn. While this can happen with any mushroom, Chlorophyllum molybdites is often implicated due to its preference for growing in lawns. C. molybdites causes severe gastrointestinal upset but is not considered deadly poisonous.

A few poisonings are the result of misidentification while attempting to collect hallucinogenic mushrooms for recreational use. In 1981, one fatality and two hospitalizations occurred following consumption of Galerina marginata, mistaken for a Psilocybe species. Galerina and Psilocybe species are both small, brown, and sticky, and can be found growing together. However, Galerina contains amatoxins, the same poison found in the deadly Amanita species. Another case reports kidney failure following ingestion of Cortinarius orellanus, a mushroom containing orellanine.

It is natural that accidental ingestion of hallucinogenic species also occurs, but is rarely harmful when ingested in small quantities. Cases of serious toxicity have been reported in small children. Amanita pantherina, while containing the same hallucinogens as Amanita muscaria (e.g., ibotenic acid and muscimol), has been more commonly associated with severe gastrointestinal upset than its better-known counterpart.

Although usually not fatal, Omphalotus spp., "Jack-o-lantern mushrooms", are another cause of sometimes significant toxicity. They are sometimes mistaken for chanterelles. Both are bright-orange and fruit at the same time of year, although Omphalotus grows on wood and has true gills rather than the veins of a Cantharellus. They contain toxins known as illudins, which causes gastrointestinal symptoms.

Bioluminescent species are generally inedible and often mildly toxic.

Clitocybe dealbata, which is occasionally mistaken for an oyster mushroom or other edible species contains muscarine.

Toxicities can also occur with collection of morels. Even true morels, if eaten raw, will cause gastrointestinal upset. Typically, morels are thoroughly cooked before eating. Verpa bohemica, although referred to as "thimble morels" or "early morels" by some, have caused toxic effects in some individuals. Gyromitra spp., "false morels", are deadly poisonous if eaten raw. They contain a toxin called gyromitrin, which can cause neurotoxicity, gastrointestinal toxicity, and destruction of the blood cells. The Finns consume Gyromitra esculenta after parboiling, but this may not render the mushroom entirely safe, resulting in its being called the "fugu of the Finnish cuisine".

A more unusual toxin is coprine, a disulfiram-like compound that is harmless unless ingested within a few days of ingesting alcohol. It inhibits aldehyde dehydrogenase, an enzyme required for breaking down alcohol. Thus, the symptoms of toxicity are similar to being hung over—flushing, headache, nausea, palpitations, and, in severe cases, trouble breathing. Coprinus species, including Coprinopsis atramentaria, contain coprine. Coprinus comatus does not, but it is best to avoid mixing alcohol with other members of this genus.

Recently, poisonings have also been associated with Amanita smithiana. These poisonings may be due to orellanine, but the onset of symptoms occurs in 4 to 11 hours, which is much quicker than the 3 to 20 days normally associated with orellanine.

Paxillus involutus is also inedible when raw, but is eaten in Europe after pickling or parboiling. However, after the death of the German mycologist Dr. Julius Schäffer, it was discovered that the mushroom contains a toxin that can stimulate the immune system to attack its red blood cells. This reaction is rare but can occur even after safely eating the mushroom for many years. Similarly, Tricholoma equestre was widely considered edible and good, until it was connected with rare cases of rhabdomyolysis.

In the fall of 2004, thirteen deaths were associated with consumption of Pleurocybella porrigens or "angel's wings". In general, these mushrooms are considered edible. All the victims died of an acute brain disorder, and all had pre-existing kidney disease. The exact cause of the toxicity was not known at this time and the deaths cannot be definitively attributed to mushroom consumption.

However, mushroom poisoning is not always due to mistaken identity. For example, the highly toxic ergot Claviceps purpurea, which grows on rye, is sometimes ground up with rye, unnoticed, and later consumed. This can cause devastating, even fatal, effects, called ergotism.

Cases of idiosyncratic or unusual reactions to fungi can also occur. Some are probably due to allergy, others to some other kind of sensitivity. It is not uncommon for a person to experience gastrointestinal upset associated with one particular mushroom species or genus.

Some mushrooms might concentrate toxins from their growth substrate, such as Chicken of the Woods growing on yew trees.

=== Poisonous mushrooms ===
Of the most lethal mushrooms, five—the death cap (A. phalloides), the three destroying angels (A. virosa, A. bisporigera, and A. ocreata), and the fool's mushroom (A. verna)—belong to the genus Amanita, and two more—the deadly webcap (C. rubellus), and the fool's webcap (C. orellanus)—are from the genus Cortinarius. Several species of Galerina, Lepiota, and Conocybe also contain lethal amounts of amatoxins. Deadly species are listed in the List of deadly fungi.

The following species may cause great discomfort, sometimes requiring hospitalization, but are not considered deadly.

- Amanita muscaria (fly agaric) – Contains the psychoactive muscimol and the neurotoxin ibotenic acid. Ibotenic acid decarboxylates into muscimol upon curing of the mushroom, rendering it relatively non-toxic, though death via respiratory depression is possible. Muscimol intoxication is often considered unpleasant and undesirable however, and as such has seen little recreational use compared to the unrelated psilocybin mushroom, though it has been used as an entheogen by the native people of Siberia.
- Amanita pantherina (panther mushroom) – contains similar toxins as A. muscaria, but is associated with more fatalities than A. muscaria.
- Chlorophyllum molybdites (greengills) – causes intense gastrointestinal upset.
- Entoloma (pinkgills) – some species are highly poisonous, such as livid entoloma (E. sinuatum), E. rhodopolium, and E. nidorosum. Symptoms of intense gastrointestinal upset appear after |20 minutes to 4 hours, caused by an unidentified gastrointestinal irritant.
- Many Inocybe species such as Inocybe fastigiata and Inocybe geophylla contain muscarine.
- Inosperma erubescens has caused death.
- Some white Clitocybe species, including C. rivulosa and C. dealbata, contain muscarine.
- Tricholoma pardinum, T. tigrinum (tiger tricholoma) – gastrointestinal upset due to an unidentified toxin, begins in 15 minutes to 2 hours and lasts 4 to 6 days.
- Tricholoma equestre (man-on-horseback) – until recently thought edible and good, can lead to rhabdomyolysis after repeated consumption.
- Hypholoma fasciculare/Naematoloma fasciculare (sulfur tuft) – usually causes gastrointestinal upset, but the toxins fasciculol E and F could lead to paralysis and death.
- Paxillus involutus (brown roll-rim) – once thought edible, but now found to destroy red blood cells with regular or long-term consumption.
- Rubroboletus satanas (Devil's bolete), Suillellus luridus, Rubroboletus legaliae, Chalciporus piperatus, Neoboletus luridiformis, Rubroboletus pulcherrimus – gastrointestinal irritation. Of these, only R. pulcherrimus has been implicated in a death. Many books list N. luridiformis as edible, but Arora lists it as "to be avoided".
- Hebeloma crustuliniforme (known as poison pie or fairy cakes) – causes gastrointestinal symptoms such as nausea and vomiting.
- Russula emetica (the sickener) – as its name implies, causes rapid vomiting. Other Russulas with a peppery taste (Russula silvicola, Russula mairei) will likely do the same.
- Agaricus hondensis, Agaricus californicus, Agaricus praeclaresquamosus, Agaricus xanthodermus – cause vomiting and diarrhea in most people, although some people seem to be immune.
- Lactifluus piperatus, Lactarius torminosus, Lactarius rufus – these and other peppery-tasting milk-caps are pickled and eaten in Scandinavia, but are indigestible or poisonous unless correctly prepared.
- Lactarius vinaceorufescens, Lactarius uvidus – reported to be poisonous. Arora reports that all yellow- or purple-staining Lactarius are "best avoided".
- Ramaria gelatinosa – causes indigestion in many people, although some seem immune.
- Gomphus floccosus (the scaly chanterelle) – causes gastric upset in many people, although some eat it without problems. G. floccosus is sometimes confused with the chanterelle.

== Evolution ==
Many different species of mushrooms are poisonous and contain differing toxins that cause different types of harm. The most common toxin that causes severe poisoning is amatoxin, found in various mushroom species that cause the most fatalities every year. Amanita phalloides, or the "death cap", is a type of mushroom named for its substantial amount of amatoxin, which has about 10 mg per mushroom, which is the lethal dose. Amatoxin blocks the replication of DNA, which leads to cell death. This can affect cells that replicate frequently, such as kidneys, livers, and eventually, the central nervous system. It can also cause the loss of muscle contraction and liver failure. Despite the severe and dangerous symptoms, amatoxin poisoning is treatable given quick, professional care.

Mushrooms have also been found to have evolved toxicity independently from each other. Researchers have found that different mushroom species share the same type of amatoxin called amanitin. They specifically looked at three of the deadliest species, Amanita, Galerina, and Lepiota. Through genome sequencing, a scientific process that determines the DNA sequence of an organism's genome, they determined that these unrelated mushrooms obtained the genetic information to produce the toxin via horizontal gene transfer. Once assimilated, it can then be passed down to an offspring. The researchers also concluded that there is "an unknown ancestral fungal donor," that allowed for horizontal gene transfer.

Mushroom toxins have appeared and disappeared many times throughout their evolutionary history. Many scientists believe that the toxins evolved in mushrooms are used to deter predation from fungivores, including mammals. If mushrooms are consumed, it can negatively affect their ability to disperse spores, survive, and reproduce. Snails and insects are fungivores and many have learned or evolved to avoid eating poisonous mushrooms. However, it is believed that mammals pose a higher threat to mushrooms than fungivores, as larger body sizes mean they are more capable of eating an entire fungus in one sitting.

Some phenotypes, or observable characteristics, may co-occur with toxicity, and therefore act as a warning signal. The first potential warning sign is aposematism, which is an adaptation that warns off predators based on a physical trait of an organism. In this case, the researchers were interested in observing whether the color of a mushroom deters predators. This would suggest that toxic mushrooms are of different colors than non-poisonous ones. The visual cue of some colors should be enough for predators to know not to consume the mushroom. The second possible warning sign is olfactory aposematism, a similar concept, but instead of focusing on color, the odor of the mushroom would be what deters predation. This would again indicate that poisonous mushrooms would emit a different odor than non-poisonous ones. Alternatively, is the ability of organisms to learn from other organisms. This would suggest that avoidance of toxic mushrooms is a learned behavior. Organisms may avoid toxic mushrooms if they observed other organisms of the same species consume the fungus. Learned behavior is when an organism learns how to behave based on previous experiences. Some researchers believe that if an organism got sick or observed another organism get sick from consuming a poisonous mushroom, then they would know not to continue consuming it for fear of getting sick again.

An analysis of 245 North American mushroom species and 265 from Europe, revealed 21.2% of the North American species and 12.1% of the European ones as poisonous. After collecting this information, and using a neural network to classify all of the mushrooms based on color and odor, the researchers concluded that there was no correlation between cap color and mushrooms containing toxins. The cap is the top, rounded part of a mushroom and comes in different colors. This suggests that cap color does not act as a warning sign to deter predators, providing no evidence that poisonous mushrooms signal their toxicity through visual traits. The three deadly mushrooms listed above, Amanita, Galerina, and Lepiota, are all of different colors, consisting of reds, yellows, browns, and whites. A possible theory as to why color is not a factor in determining whether a mushroom is poisonous is the fact that many of its predators are nocturnal and have poor vision. Therefore, viewing the different colors is difficult, and could result in inaccurate consumption. The study, however, did suggest that poisonous mushrooms do emit a smell that is unpleasant and therefore discourages consumption. Despite this result, there is no definitive evidence to suggest if the odor is a result of the production of the toxin or if it is intended as a warning signal. Additionally, many of the odors are not picked up by humans. This could suggest that there is another characteristic difference between poisonous and non-poisonous mushrooms to avoid predation from larger mammals or that there is another purpose for some mushrooms being poisonous that is not dependent on predators.

== Prognosis and treatment ==
Some mushrooms contain compounds of lower toxicity and, therefore, are not severely poisonous. Poisonings by these mushrooms may respond well to treatment. However, certain types of mushrooms contain very potent toxins and are very poisonous; so even if symptoms are treated promptly, mortality is high. With some toxins, death can occur in a week or a few days. Although a liver or kidney transplant may save some patients with complete organ failure, in many cases there are no organs available. Patients hospitalized and given aggressive support therapy almost immediately after ingestion of amanitin-containing mushrooms have a mortality rate of only 10%, whereas those admitted 60 or more hours after ingestion have a 50–90% mortality rate. In the United States, mushroom poisoning kills an average of about 3 people a year. According to National Poison Data System (NPDS) annual reports published by America's Poison Centers, the average number of deaths occurring over a ten-year period (2012–2020) sits right at 3 a year. In 2012, 4 out of the 7 total deaths that occurred that year, were attributed to a single event where a "housekeeper at a Board and Care Home for elderly dementia patients collected and cooked wild (Amanita) mushrooms into a sauce that she consumed with six residents of the home.". Over 1,300 emergency room visits in the United States were attributed to poisonous mushroom ingestion in 2016, with about 9% of patients experiencing a serious adverse outcome.

== Society and culture ==
=== Folklore ===
Many old wives' tales concern the defining features of poisonous mushrooms. However, there are no general identifiers for poisonous mushrooms, so such beliefs are unreliable. Guidelines to identify particular mushrooms exist, and will serve only if one knows which mushrooms are toxic.

Examples of erroneous folklore "rules" include:

- "Poisonous mushrooms are brightly colored." – Indeed, fly agaric, usually bright-red to orange or yellow, is narcotic and hallucinogenic, although no human deaths have been reported. The deadly destroying angel, in contrast, is an unremarkable white. The deadly Galerinas are brown. Some choice edible species (chanterelles, Amanita caesarea, Laetiporus sulphureus, etc.) are brightly colored, whereas most poisonous species are brown or white.
- "Insects/animals will avoid toxic mushrooms." – Fungi that are harmless to invertebrates can still be toxic to humans; the death cap, for instance, is often infested by insect larvae.
- "Poisonous mushrooms blacken silver." – None of the known mushroom toxins react with silver.
- "Poisonous mushrooms taste bad." – People who have eaten the deadly Amanitas and survived have reported that the mushrooms tasted quite good.
- "All mushrooms are safe if cooked/parboiled/dried/pickled/etc." – While it is true that some otherwise-inedible species can be rendered safe by special preparation, many toxic species cannot be made toxin-free. Many fungal toxins are not particularly sensitive to heat and so are not broken down during cooking; in particular, α-amanitin, the poison produced by the death cap (Amanita phalloides) and others of the genus, is not denatured by heat.
- "Poisonous mushrooms will turn rice red when boiled." – A number of Laotian refugees were hospitalized after eating mushrooms (probably toxic Russula species) deemed safe by this folklore rule and this misconception cost at least one person her life.
- "Poisonous mushrooms have a pointed cap. Edible ones have a flat, rounded cap." – The shape of the mushroom cap does not correlate with presence or absence of mushroom toxins, so this is not a reliable method to distinguish between edible and poisonous species. Death cap, for instance, has a rounded cap when mature.
- "Boletes are, in general, safe to eat." – It is true that, unlike a number of Amanita species in particular, in most parts of the world, there are no known deadly varieties of the genus Boletus, which reduces the risks associated with misidentification. However, mushrooms like the Devil's bolete are poisonous both raw and cooked and can lead to strong gastrointestinal symptoms, and other species like the lurid bolete require thorough cooking to break down toxins. As with another mushroom genera, proper caution is, therefore, advised in determining the correct species.

=== Notable cases ===
- Siddhartha Gautama (known as The Buddha), by some accounts, may have died of mushroom poisoning around ~479 BCE, though this claim has not been universally accepted.
- Roman Emperor Claudius is said to have been murdered by being fed the death cap mushroom. However, this story first appeared some two centuries after the events, and it is debatable whether Claudius was murdered at all.
- The best-selling author Nicholas Evans (The Horse Whisperer) was poisoned (but survived) after eating Cortinarius rubellus.
- The parents of the physicist Daniel Gabriel Fahrenheit, who created the Fahrenheit temperature scale, died in Danzig on 14 August 1701 from accidentally eating poisonous mushrooms.
- On faulty advice from a friend who was also a doctor, the composer Johann Schobert insisted that certain poisonous mushrooms he had gathered were edible despite the express warning of cooks at two separate restaurants to which he had taken the mushrooms. Schobert ultimately died from consuming the mushrooms, as did his wife, most of their children, their maidservant, the doctor friend, and three other acquaintances.
- 2023 Leongatha mushroom murders − Australian woman Erin Patterson was found guilty of three murders and one attempted murder of members of her estranged husband's family by serving them beef Wellingtons which contained A. phalloides. Three of the four guests died within days of the meal, while one survived after receiving an organ transplant and spending multiple weeks in a coma.

== See also ==
- List of deadly fungi (for lethal species only)
- List of poisonous fungi (including non-deadly species that are nevertheless harmful)
- Pathogenic fungus
