= Orellanine =

- Orellanine

Names
- IUPAC name 3,3′,4,4′-Tetrahydroxy-2,2′-bipyridine-N,N′-dioxide
- Other names Orellanin, 2,2-Bipyridine-3,3-4,4-tetrol-1,1-dioxide

Identifiers
CAS Number	37338-80-0
3D model (JSmol)	Interactive image
ChemSpider	10266115 (N-oxide form); 80848 (non-zwitterionic form)
ECHA InfoCard	100.232.424
PubChem CID	89579
UNII	082U1GSX3D
- InChI: InChI=1S/C10H8N2O6/c13-5-1-3-11(17)7(9(5)15)8-10(16)6(14)2-4-12(8)18/h1-4,13-16H Key: JEWWXPOUSBVQKG-UHFFFAOYSA-N
- SMILES: [O-][n+]1ccc(O)c(O)c1c2[n+]([O-])ccc(O)c2O

Properties
Chemical formula	C_{10}H_{8}N_{2}O_{6}
Molar mass	252.182 g·mol^{−1}
Appearance	Colorless to white crystalline powder
Odor	Odorless

Hazards
- Occupational safety and health (OHS/OSH)
Main hazards	Highly toxic with delayed onset of toxicity
- GHS labelling
Pictograms	(GHS06: Toxic) (GHS08: Health hazard)
Signal word	Danger
Hazard statements	H300, H370
Precautionary statements	P260, P264, P270, P301+P310, P307+P311, P321, P330, P405, P501
- Except where otherwise noted, data are given for materials in their standard state (at 25 °C [77 °F], 100 kPa). Infobox references

Orellanine or orellanin is a toxin found in a group of mushrooms known as the Orellani within the family Cortinariaceae. Structurally, it is a bipyridine N-oxide compound somewhat related to the herbicide diquat.

== History ==
Orellanine first came to people's attention in 1952 when a mass poisoning of 102 people in Konin, Poland resulted in 11 deaths. Orellanine comes from a class of mushrooms that fall under the genus Cortinarius, and has been found in the species C. orellanus, rubellus, henrici, rainerensis and bruneofulvus. Poisonings related to these mushrooms have occurred predominately in Europe where mushroom foraging was common, though cases of orellanine poisoning have been reported in North America and Australia as well. There are several reported cases of people ingesting orellanine-containing mushrooms after mistaking them for edible or hallucinogenic mushrooms.

Orellanine was first isolated in 1962, when Stanisław Grzymala extracted and isolated orellanine from the mushroom C. orellanus. Grzymala was also able to demonstrate the nephrotoxicity of C. orellanus and determine various physical and chemical properties of orellanine. He found that the toxicity of the mushroom was due to both delayed and acute kidney injury.

The chemical structure of orellanine was first deduced by Antkowiak and Gessner in 1979, who identified it as 3,3',4,4'-tetrahydroxy- 2,2'-bipyridine-1,1'-dioxide.

The first successful synthesis of orellanine was reported in 1985. The total synthesis of orellanine starting with the bromination of 3-hydroxypyridine was reported a year later in 1986.

== Synthesis ==
The first synthesis of orellanine was reported in 1985 by Dehmlow and Schulz, and required ten steps starting from 3-aminopyridine. The following year, Tiecco et al. reported the total synthesis of orellanine in nine steps starting from 3-hydroxypyridine.

The nine-step total synthesis of orellanine (compound 11) from 3-hydroxypyridine (compound 1) described by Tiecco et al. in 1986.

== Structure ==
Orellanine is a bipyridine N-oxide. Orellanine displays tautomerism, with the more stable tautomer being the pyridine N-oxide form.

Tautomerization of orellanine. The more stable (oxide) form is shown on the left.

The chemical structure of synthetically produced orellanine has been confirmed by X-ray crystallography. In this crystal structure, the two pyridine rings are nearly perpendicular to each other, making orellanine chiral. However, samples of orellanine extracted from mushrooms are optically inactive racemic mixtures, likely due to racemization during the extraction process.

== Toxicity ==
Orellanine displays a wide spectrum of toxin effects in plants, animals, and microorganisms. Although the mechanism of toxicity of orellanine is not yet fully understood, it likely targets cellular processes found in both prokaryotes and eukaryotes. Orellanine has been found to inhibit the synthesis of biomolecules such as proteins, RNA, and DNA, and promote non-competitive inhibition of several enzymes such as alkaline phosphatase, γ-glutamyltransferase, and leucyl aminopeptidase. In addition, orellanine has also been shown to interfere with the production of adenosine triphosphatase.

Orellanine is a bipyridine with positively charged nitrogen atoms, and chemically resembles the bipyridine herbicides paraquat and diquat. Like orellanine, paraquat and diquat are toxic not only to plants, but also to humans and livestock. Bipyridine compounds with charged nitrogen atoms disrupt important redox reactions in organisms, 'stealing' one or two electrons and sometimes passing the electrons along into other, often undesirable, redox reactions. The terminal products of these reactions can be harmful reactive oxygen species such as hydrogen peroxide. It is thought that orellanine produces oxidative stress in a similar manner to paraquat and diquat.

In humans, a characteristic of poisoning by the nephrotoxin orellanine is the long latency; the first symptoms usually do not appear until 2–4 to 14 days after ingestion. The latent period decreases with the quantity of mushrooms consumed. The first symptoms of orellanine poisoning are similar to the common flu (nausea, vomiting, stomach pains, headaches, myalgia, etc.), these symptoms are followed by early stages of kidney failure (immense thirst, frequent urination, pain on and around the kidneys) and eventually decreased or nonexistent urine output and other symptoms of kidney failure occur. If left untreated death will follow.

The LD_{50} of orellanine in mice is 12 to 20 mg per kg body weight; this is the dose which leads to death within two weeks. From cases of orellanine-related mushroom poisoning in humans it seems that the lethal dose for humans is considerably lower.

== Treatment ==
There is no known antidote against orellanine poisoning. Treatment consists mainly of supportive care and hemodialysis, if needed. Complete recovery of renal function is recovered in only 30% of poisoned patients. There are reports of cases where treatment using corticosteroids and antioxidants led to improved clinical outcomes.

== Research ==
This compound is currently in clinical trials as a potential treatment for various forms of renal cancer.

== See also ==
- Lethal webcaps
- Cortinarius
- Nephrotoxin
- Diquat
