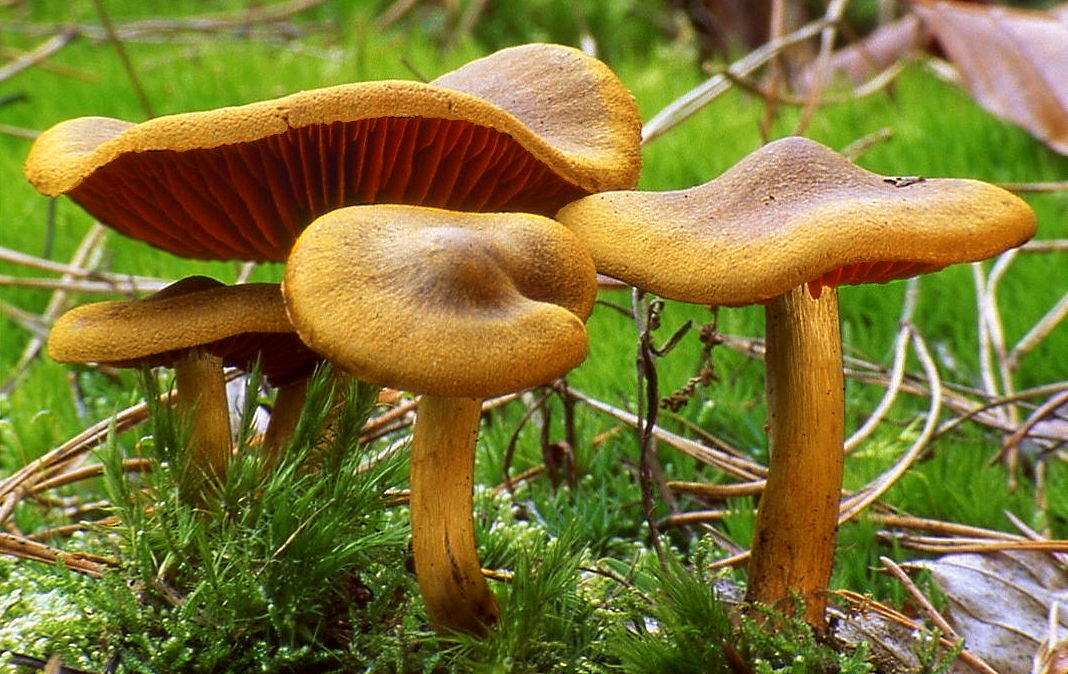

Scientific classification
- Kingdom: Fungi
- Division: Basidiomycota
- Class: Agaricomycetes
- Order: Agaricales
- Family: Cortinariaceae
- Genus: Cortinarius
- Species: C. semisanguineus

Binomial name
- Cortinarius semisanguineus (Fr.) Gillet

Synonyms
- Dermocybe sanguinea

= Cortinarius semisanguineus =

Species of fungus

Cortinarius semisanguineus Mycological characteristics
- Gills on hymenium
- Cap is campanulate or umbonate
- Hymenium is adnate or sinuate
- Stipe has a cortina
- Spore print is reddish-brown
- Ecology is mycorrhizal
- Edibility is unknown but not recommended

Cortinarius semisanguineus is a medium-sized mushroom with a pale brown to ochre cap, and bright blood-red gills. It belongs to the genus Cortinarius, a group collectively known as webcaps. It is found growing in conifer plantations, and has recently been given the fanciful common name of surprise webcap. In the past it has been called the red-gilled webcap.

== Taxonomy ==
This mushroom is placed by some authorities in the genus Dermocybe. Most mycologists retain Dermocybe as merely a subgenus of Cortinarius. The group contains almost 30 species. The species name semisanguineus means 'half blood-red', a reference to the gill colour, as compared with C. sanguineus, which is wholly blood-red.

== Description ==
The cap is campanulate (bell-shaped), and later flattens, but retains a broad umbo (shield-like central boss). It is usually between 2–5 cm (1–2 in) across, brownish ochre, or umber and with a darker centre. It is covered in fine fibrils, and is dry. The stipe is usually the same colour as the cap or paler, and is smooth, or finely fibrillose like the cap. It is long, slim, and cylindrical. Cortinal remnants often left on the stem in this species can be quite fleeting. The gills are adnate, markedly sinuate, and fairly crowded. They are initially blood-red, but turn cinnamon-brown on aging, giving a spore print of the same colour. The flesh is said to smell of radishes, and it is ochre in the stem, but more olive in the cap.

=== Similar species ===
Cortinarius ominosus, C. purpureus, and C. tinctorum are similar.

C. phoeniceus, has a redder cap, and more distinct red cortinal remnants around the stem.

== Distribution and habitat ==
Cortinarius semisanguineus appears in conifer, or mixed conifer, and birch woods in autumn (fall). It is occasional in Britain, Europe, Scandinavia, and common in parts of North America. It has a mycorrhizal relationship with birch trees (Betula), and other coniferous softwood trees. It is often abundant under young spruce in plantations on acid soil, appearing from September to November.

== Edibility ==
The species cannot be recommended for the table as it is suspected of being toxic; it may contain similar poisonous compounds to other species found in the Dermocybe subgenus of Cortinarius, such as C. orellanus and its close relatives.

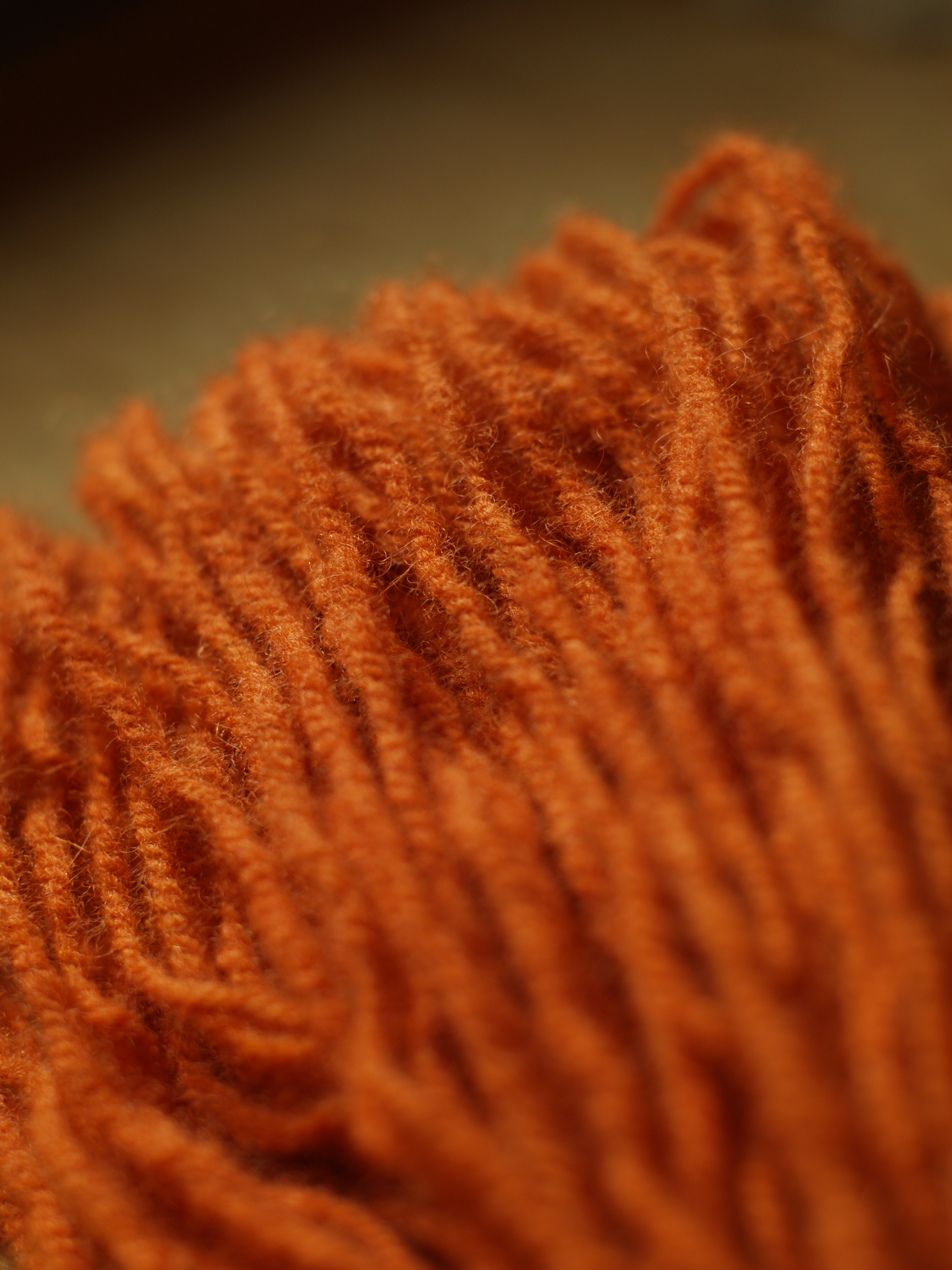
Wool yarn dyed with C. semisanguineus

== Other uses ==
Cortinarius semisanguineus can be used as a dye for textile yarns.

== See also ==
- List of Cortinarius species
