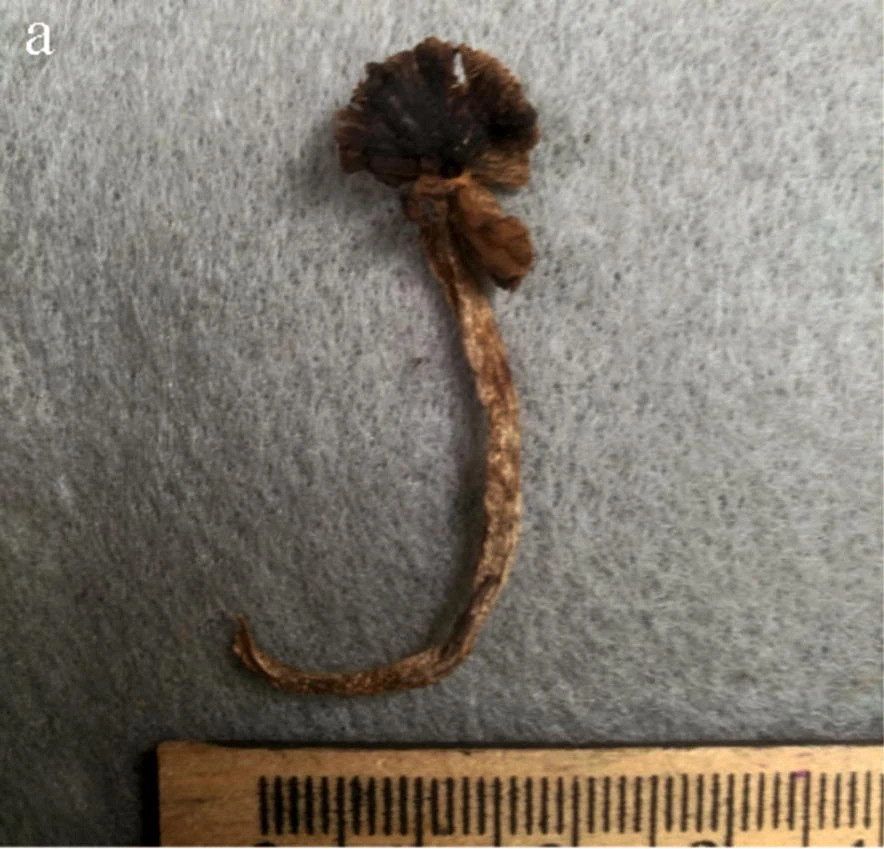
- Type specimen
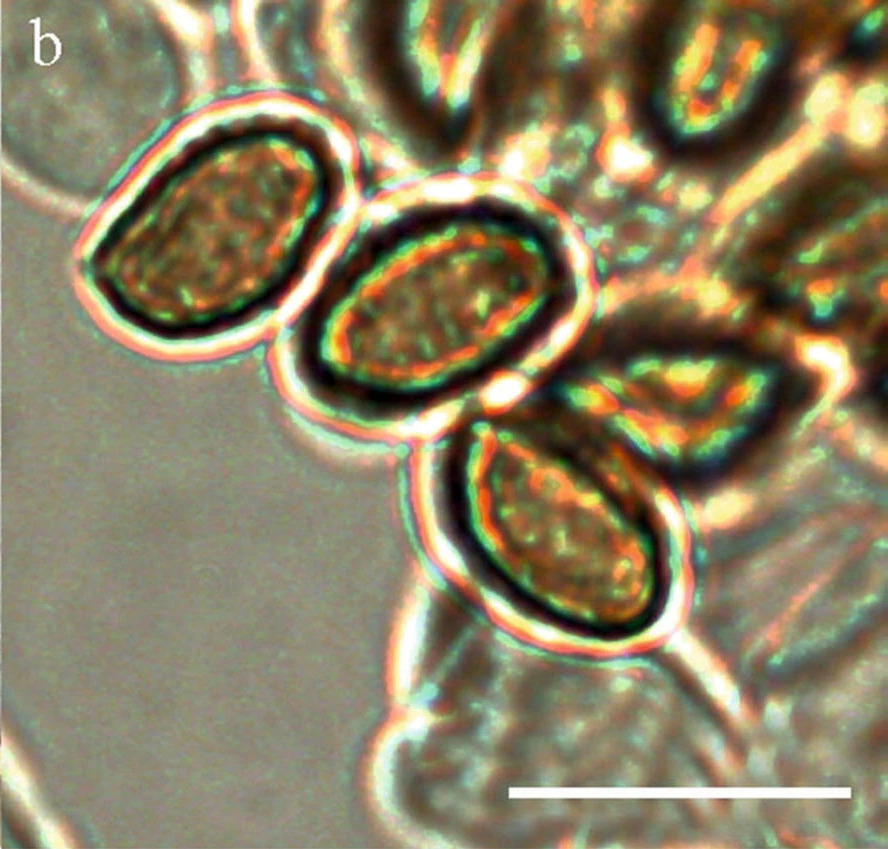
- Spores

Scientific classification
- Domain: Eukaryota
- Kingdom: Fungi
- Division: Basidiomycota
- Class: Agaricomycetes
- Order: Agaricales
- Family: Cortinariaceae
- Genus: Cortinarius
- Species: C. aurae

Binomial name
- Cortinarius aurae Niskanen & Liimat. (2020)

= Cortinarius aurae =

Species of fungus

Cortinarius aurae is a little brown mushroom found in Europe and North America, originally described from a UK specimen in 2020. It was named in honour of the describing authors' new born daughter. Along with five other British webcaps, C. aurae was selected by Kew Gardens as a highlight of taxa described by the organisation's staff and affiliates in 2020.

== Taxonomy ==
Cortinarius aurae was described in a 2020 research note in the journal Fungal Diversity by Kare Liimatainen and Tuula Niskanen. The description was based on a collection made by Liimatainen in 2015 in the Black Wood of Rannoch, Perthshire, Scotland. The species was named after the authors' newborn daughter, Aura. Phylogenetic analysis placed the species in Cortinarius sect. Obtusi.

Cortinarius aurae was one of over 150 botanical and mycological taxa described by staff or affiliates of Kew Gardens in 2020. In a year-end round-up, Kew scientists selected ten highlights, one of which was six newly described British Cortinarius species: C. scoticus and C. aurae from the Black Wood of Rannoch; C. britannicus described from Caithness; C. subsaniosus from Cumbria; C. ainsworthii from Brighton; and C. heatherae from Heathrow Airport. In a press release, Kew identified Cortinarius species as "ecologically important in supporting the growth of plants, particularly trees such as oak, beech, birch and pine" and playing "a key role in the carbon cycling of woodlands and providing nitrogen to trees".

== Description ==
Cortinarius aurae mushrooms have a red-brown, conical to somewhat convex cap that is 0.5 to 3 centimetres (0.2 to 1 in) wide. The cap is hygrophanous, and often has an umbo. The yellowish brown gills are medium spaced. The stem is 1.5 to 6 centimetres (0.6 to 2 in) long and 0.1 to 0.4 centimetres (0.04 to 0.2 in) thick. It is cylindrical, and the base can push into the substrate. When the mushroom is young, the stem is covered in white fibrils; older mushrooms have yellowish brown stems. The stem has a white, sparse universal veil. The flesh is brown. At the base of the stem, there is a weak iodoform-like odour (especially in slightly dried mushrooms), but there is no distinct smell on the gills.

=== Microscopic characteristics ===
Cortinarius aurae basidiospores measure 6.5 to 8 by 4.5 to 5.5 micrometres (μm), averaging 7.0 by 4.7 μm. They are generally ellipsoid, but sometimes almond-shaped. They are moderately warty, and fairly dextrinoid, meaning that they turn reddish to reddish-brown when stained with Melzer's reagent or Lugol's solution. The basidia measure 24 to 32 by 7 9.5 μm. They are club-shaped, with four sterigmata. The hyphae in the flesh of the gills are golden brown, strongly encrusted with zebra-striped encrustations. The pileipellis surface is pale, consisting of more or less parallel hyphae 8 to 13 μm wide that are densely encrusted with zebra-striped incrustations. Below the surface, the cells are pale orange-brown, measuring 15.5 to 47 by 10 to 23 μm, and are densely encrusted with zebra-striped incrustations.

=== Similar species ===
Cortinarius aurae is most reminiscent of C. obtusus, but the latter has somewhat larger (8 to 9 by 4.5 to 5 μm), almond-shaped spores.

== Ecology ==
Cortinarius aurae is found in mesic to damp coniferous forests, but also known to occur with sweet chestnut (Castanea sativa). The species is widespread, being known from both Europe and North America.
