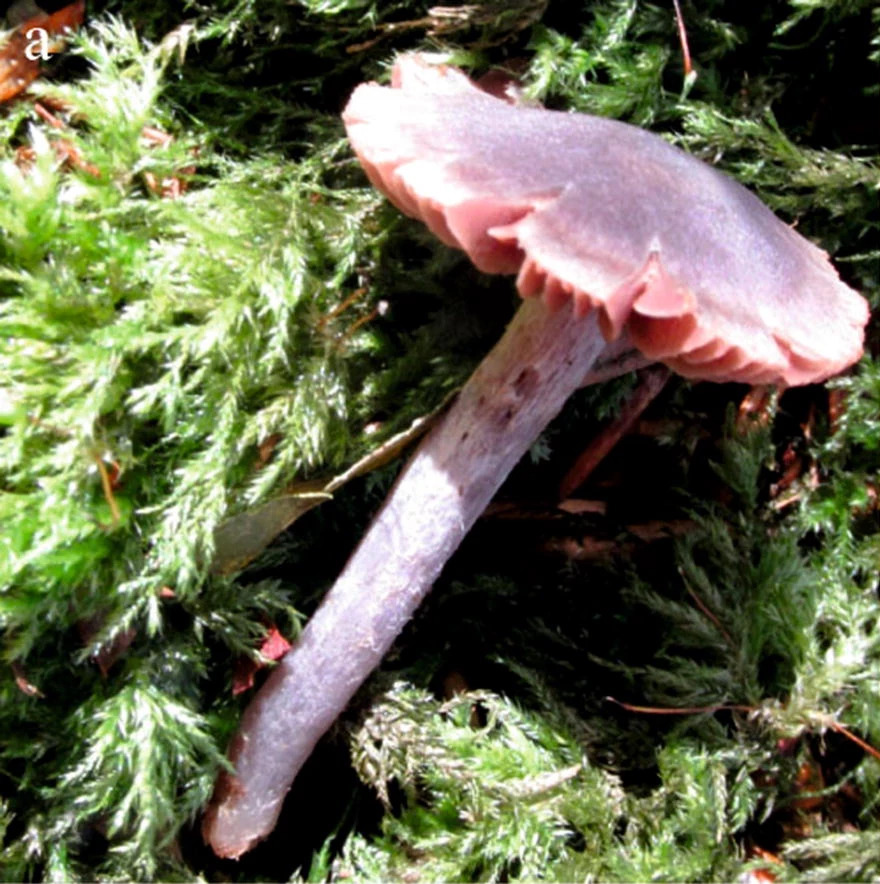
- Type specimen
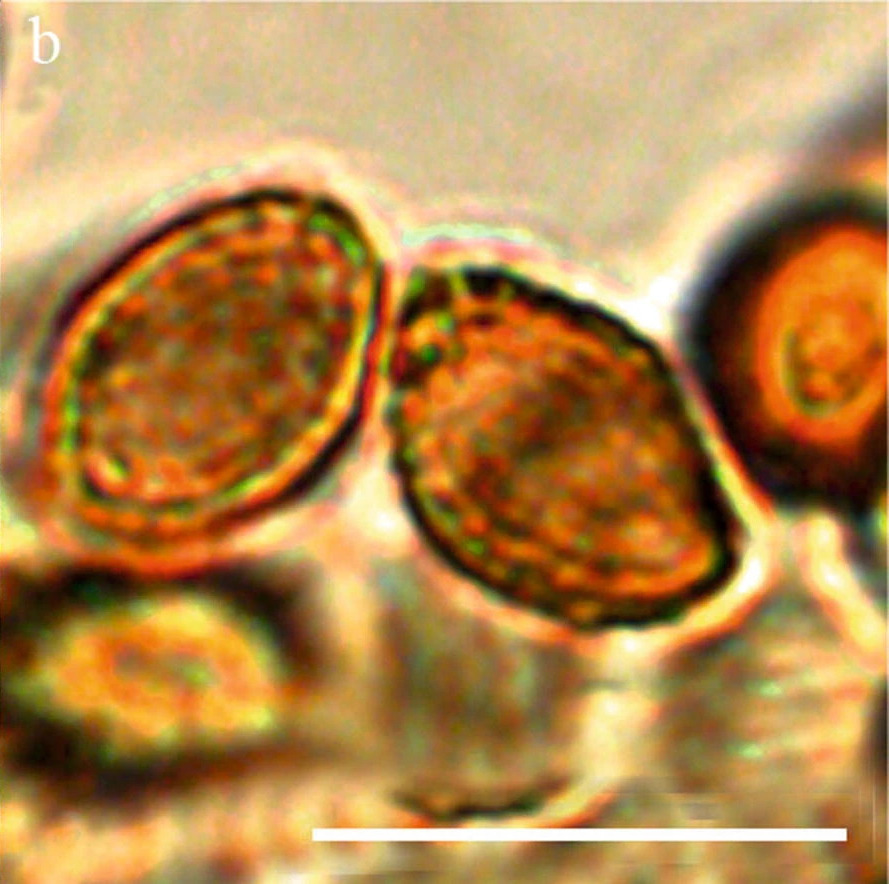
- Spores

Scientific classification
- Domain: Eukaryota
- Kingdom: Fungi
- Division: Basidiomycota
- Class: Agaricomycetes
- Order: Agaricales
- Family: Cortinariaceae
- Genus: Cortinarius
- Species: C. britannicus

Binomial name
- Cortinarius britannicus Liimat. & Niskanen (2020)

= Cortinarius britannicus =

Species of fungus

Cortinarius britannicus is a species of webcap. It is known only from Scotland, where it was found on clay soil among mosses under beech. The species produces small, purplish mushrooms. Along with five other British webcaps, C. britannicus was selected by Kew Gardens as a highlight of taxa described by the organisation's staff and affiliates in 2020.

== Taxonomy ==
Cortinarius britannicus was described in a 2020 research note in the journal Fungal Diversity by Kare Liimatainen and Tuula Niskanen. The description was based on a collection made by Dave J. Savage in 2017 in Olrig Wood, Caithness, Scotland. The specific name refers to Britain, as this is where the species was first found. Phylogenetic analysis placed the species in Cortinarius subgenus Telamonia and section Bicolores. The species formed a sister group with C. cystidiobicolor.

C. britannicus was one of over 150 botanical and mycological taxa described by staff or affiliates of Kew Gardens in 2020. In a year-end round-up, Kew scientists selected ten highlights, one of which was six newly described British Cortinarius species: C. britannicus described from Caithness; C. scoticus and C. aurae from the Black Wood of Rannoch; C. subsaniosus from Cumbria; C. ainsworthii from Brighton; and C. heatherae from Heathrow Airport. In a press release, Kew identified Cortinarius species as "ecologically important in supporting the growth of plants, particularly trees such as oak, beech, birch and pine" and playing "a key role in the carbon cycling of woodlands and providing nitrogen to trees".

== Description ==
Cortinarius britannicus mushrooms have a cap that is 2 to 3 centimetres (0.8 to 1 in) wide and a low convex shape. The cap is a greyish purple and hygrophanous. The edges of the cap have whitish fibrils. The adnexed gills are medium spaced. They are brown with paler edges. The stalk is 3 to 4 centimetres (1 to 2 in) long and 0.35 centimetres (0.14 in) thick at apex. It is cylindrical to somewhat tapering downwards. Silky, whitish fibrils cover a greyish purple base. The stem has a white universal veil, which forms incomplete girdle-like structures on the stem. The gills have no distinct odour.

=== Microscopic characteristics ===
The almond-shaped basidiospores measure 8 to 9 by 5 to micrometres (μm), averaging 8.6 by 5.6 μm. The spores have a depression above the hilum, and are moderately warty, especially at the apex. The spores are moderately to strongly dextrinoid, meaning that they stain reddish to reddish-brown when Melzer's reagent or Lugol's solution is applied. The basidia are 26 to 35 by 7 to 10 μm. They are roughly club-shaped, sporting four sterigmata. The flesh in the gills is made up of rusty-brown hyphae. They are moderately covered with spot-like encrustations. The pileipellis surface is pale, consisting of more or less parallel hyphae that are 5 to 13 μm wide with zebra-like incrustations. Lower hyphae are rusty brown, 25 to 30 μm wide, with abundant zebra-like incrustations.

=== Similar species ===
Cortinarius section Bicolores contains species that produce similar but much larger mushrooms. C. britannicus can be distinguished from other members of the subgenus by its combination of small-sized, purplish-coloured mushrooms and almond-shaped, medium-sized spores.

== Ecology ==
The species is known only from Britain, where it was found on clay soil among mosses under beech (Fagus), specifically a European beech.
