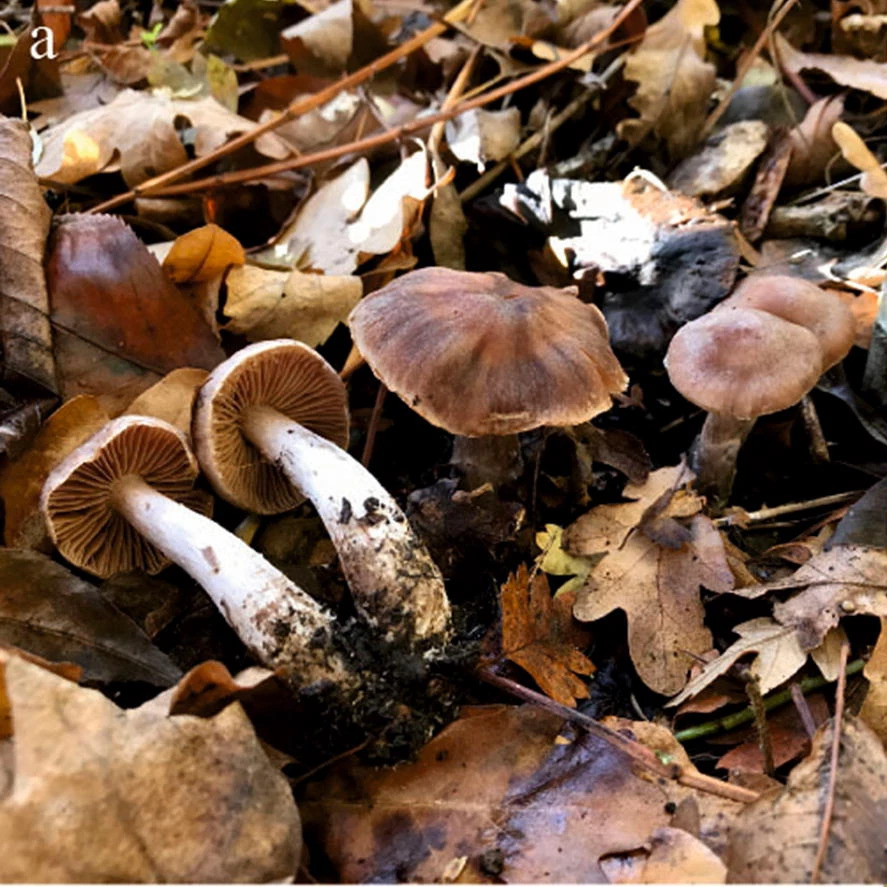
- Type specimen
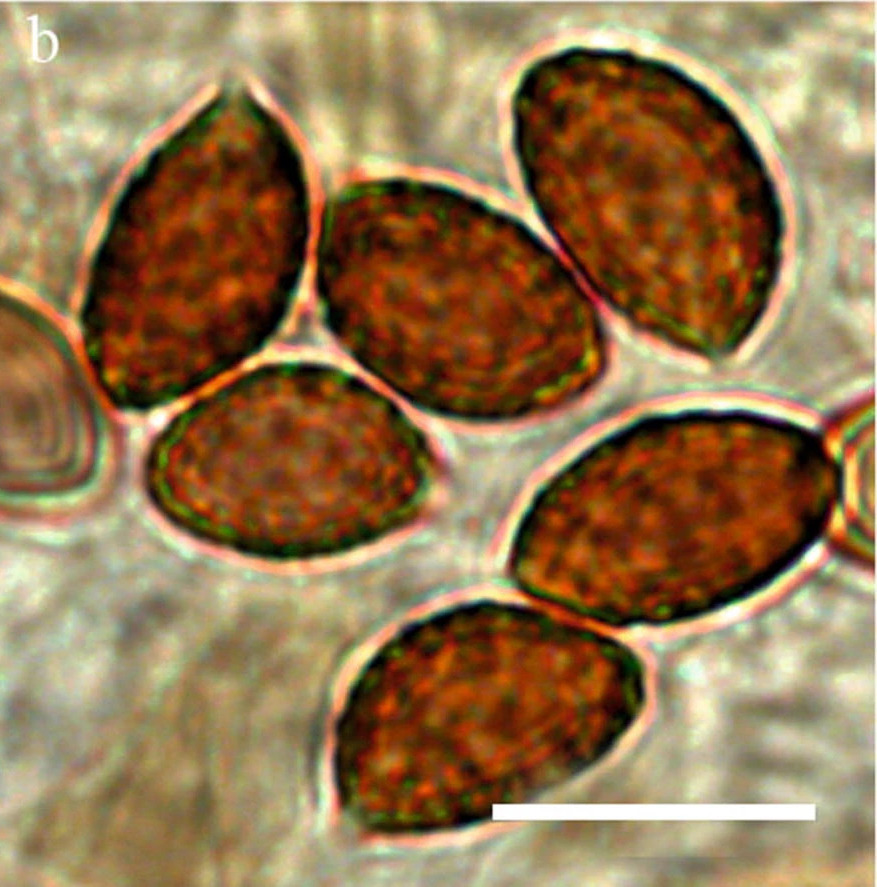
- Spores

Scientific classification
- Domain: Eukaryota
- Kingdom: Fungi
- Division: Basidiomycota
- Class: Agaricomycetes
- Order: Agaricales
- Family: Cortinariaceae
- Genus: Cortinarius
- Species: C. heatherae

Binomial name
- Cortinarius heatherae Overall (2020)

= Cortinarius heatherae =

Species of fungus

Cortinarius heatherae is a species of webcap. It was described in 2020 by Andy Overall from a specimen found at Heathrow Airport. He named the species in honour of his wife, Heather Overall. Along with five other British webcaps, C. heatherae was selected by Kew Gardens as a highlight of taxa described by the organisation's staff and affiliates in 2020.

== Taxonomy ==
Cortinarius heatherae was described in a 2020 research note in the journal Fungal Diversity by Andy Overall. The description was based on a collection made by Overall in 2018 at Heathrow Airport, England. The specific name honours Heather Overall, Andy Overall's wife. Phylogenetic analysis placed the species in Cortinarius sect. Bovini. It is closely related to C. subbrunneus, and is a sister species to both C. subbrunneus and C. subbrunneoideus.

C. britannicus was one of over 150 botanical and mycological taxa described by staff or affiliates of Kew Gardens in 2020. In a year-end round-up, Kew scientists selected ten highlights, one of which was six newly described British Cortinarius species: C. heatherae described from Heathrow Airport; C. ainsworthii from Brighton; C. britannicus from Caithness; C. scoticus and C. aurae from the Black Wood of Rannoch; and C. subsaniosus from Cumbria. In a press release, Kew identified Cortinarius species as "ecologically important in supporting the growth of plants, particularly trees such as oak, beech, birch and pine" and playing "a key role in the carbon cycling of woodlands and providing nitrogen to trees".

== Description ==
Cortinarius heatherae mushrooms have a cap measuring 3 to 5.7 centimetres (1.2 to 2.2 in) wide, at first convex, later plano-convex with a broad umbo. The surface is covered in silky whitish fibrils when the mushroom is young, though these are later more apparent only in the margin. It is reddish brown, later darkening or blackening in large spots, and hygrophanous. The gills are adnate (attached to the stem on their whole length), medium spaced, and fairly broad. At first, they are light brown with a paler edge, becoming rusty brown to dark brown at maturity. The stem measures 6.3 to 8.2 centimetres (2.5 to 3.2 in) long, and is 0.7 to 1.5 centimetres (0.3 to 0.6 in) thick. It is more or less club-shaped. At first, it is covered with greyish white silky fibrils, though it is later a pale greyish brown. The flesh is greyish brown and marbled hygrophanous. The universal veil is cream-coloured, forming scattered patterns on the surface of the stem. No record was made of odour.

=== Microscopic characteristics ===
Cortinarius heatherae has basidiospores that measure 9 to 11 by 5.5 to 7 micrometres (μm), averaging 10.0 by 6.2 μm. They mostly almond-shaped, strongly warty, and strongly dextrinoid, meaning they stain a deep reddish to reddish-brown when Melzer's reagent or Lugol's solution is applied. The basidia measure 33 to 46 by 7 to 11 μm and are somewhat club-shaped, with four sterigmata. The flesh in the gills is made up of smooth hyphae. The surface of the pileipellis is pale, consisting of parallel hyphae. They are 6 to 8 μm wide, smooth to encrusted with spot-like encrustations. Lower, the cells are colourless, measuring 17 to 50 by 11 to 19, and smooth.

=== Similar species ===
Cortinarius heatherae is typical of species in Cortinarius sect. Bovini, featuring medium-sized, brown mushrooms; caps that become dark spotted with age; the stem is club-shaped; and the spores are almond-shaped. The sister species C. subbrunneus and C. subbrunneoideus grow in coniferous forests, and also differ in microscopic features: the spores of C. subbrunneus are narrower and slightly larger, whereas the spores of C. subbrunneoideus are smaller and only somewhat to moderately dextrinoid.

== Ecology ==
Cortinarius heatherae is known from temperate mixed forests containing English oak, evergreen oak, and willows on calcareous soil. It is known only from Britain.
