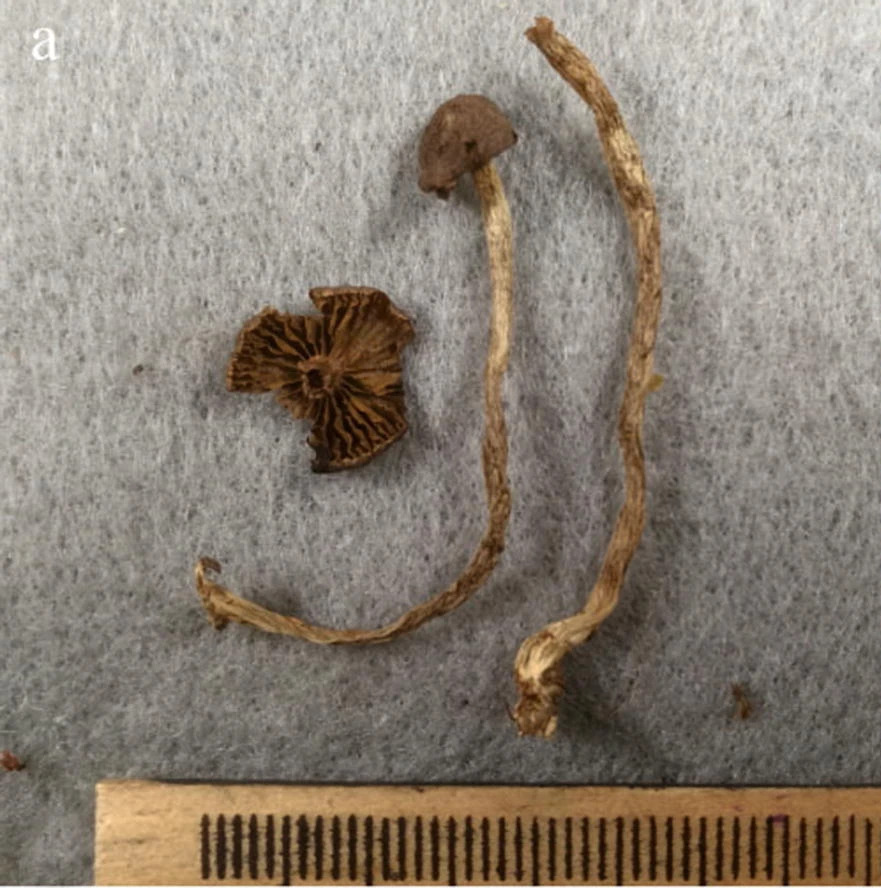
- Type specimen
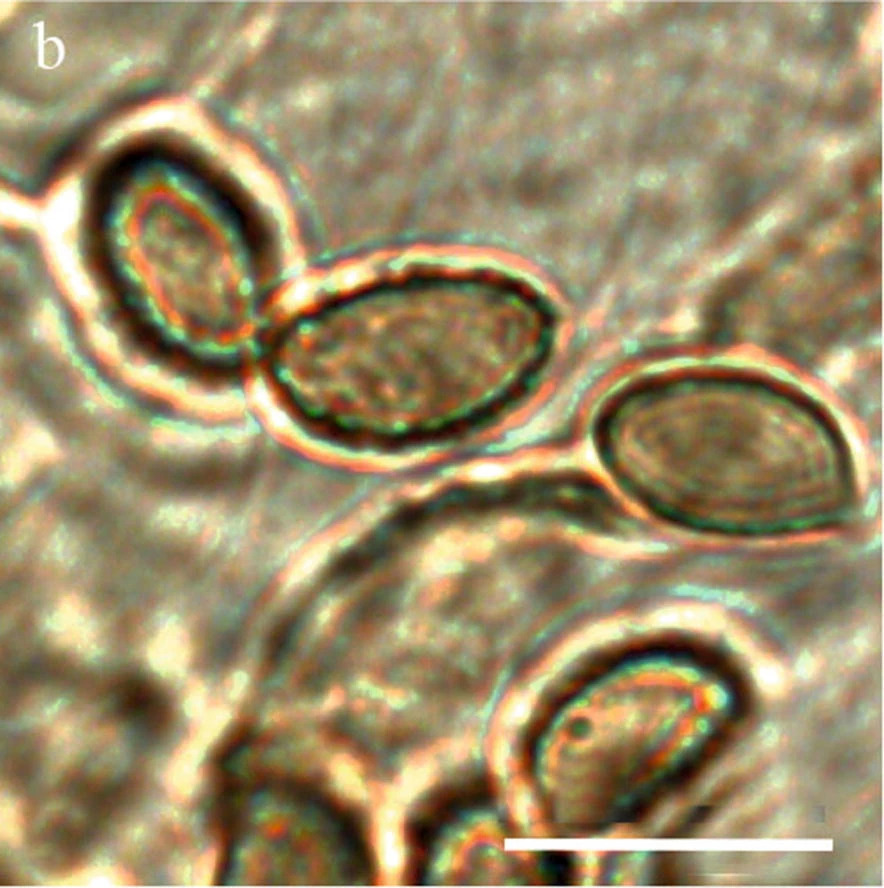
- Spores

Scientific classification
- Domain: Eukaryota
- Kingdom: Fungi
- Division: Basidiomycota
- Class: Agaricomycetes
- Order: Agaricales
- Family: Cortinariaceae
- Genus: Cortinarius
- Species: C. scoticus

Binomial name
- Cortinarius scoticus Niskanen & Liimat. (2020)

= Cortinarius scoticus =

Species of fungus

Cortinarius scoticus is a little brown mushroom known from central and northern Europe, where it grows in pine forests. It was described in 2020, and named for Scotland, where it was first found. Along with five other British webcaps, C. scoticus was selected by Kew Gardens as a highlight of taxa described by the organisation's staff and affiliates in 2020.

== Taxonomy ==
Cortinarius scoticus was described in a 2020 research note in the journal Fungal Diversity by Tuula Niskanen and Kare Liimatainen. The description was based on a collection made by Niskanen in 2015 in the Black Wood of Rannoch, Perthshire, Scotland, and the species was named after the holotype's country of origin. Phylogenetic analysis placed the species in Cortinarius sect. Obtusi. The species shares a number of identifying features with other members of the section, namely: the weak, iodoform-like, odour at the base of the stipe; the white and sparse universal veil; and small, brown fruiting bodies.

Cortinarius scoticus was one of over 150 botanical and mycological taxa described by staff or affiliates of Kew Gardens in 2020. In a year-end round-up, Kew scientists selected ten highlights, one of which was six newly described British Cortinarius species: C. scoticus and C. aurae from the Black Wood of Rannoch; C. britannicus described from Caithness; C. subsaniosus from Cumbria; C. ainsworthii from Brighton; and C. heatherae from Heathrow Airport. In a press release, Kew identified Cortinarius species as "ecologically important in supporting the growth of plants, particularly trees such as oak, beech, birch and pine" and playing "a key role in the carbon cycling of woodlands and providing nitrogen to trees".

== Description ==
Cortinarius scoticus mushrooms have caps that are 0.7 to 1.5 centimetres (0.3 to 0.6 in) wide. They are hemispherical, maturing to a low convex or almost flat. The caps are red brown to dark red brown, and hygrophanous. The gills are brown and medium spaced. The stem is 4 to 6 centimetres (2 to 2 in) long and 0.2 to 0.3 centimetres (0.08 to 0.1 in) thick. The stems are cylindrical. When young, they are covered with silky, white fibrils, though they mature to yellowish brown. The flesh is brown. At the base of the stem, it has a weak, iodoform-like, smell that is best observed when the mushroom is slightly dried. In the gills, however, the scent is indistinct. The stem has a sparse, white, universal veil.

=== Microscopic characteristics ===
Cortinarius scoticus has basidiospores measuring 7.5 to 8.8 by 4.5 to 5.5 micrometres (μm). The spores are ellipsoid to somewhat almond-shaped, and moderately warty. They are fairly dextrinoid, meaning that they stain reddish to reddish-brown when Melzer's reagent or Lugol's solution is applied. The basidia are 25 to 34 by 7 to 10 μm. They are club-shaped, with four sterigmata. The hyphae in the flesh of the gills are yellowish brown, fairly strongly encrusted with zebra-striped encrustations. The surface of the pileipellis is pale, consisting of more or less parallel hyphae, 5 μm wide, without encrustations. Lower cells in the pileipellis are 19 to 44 by 10 to 20 μm. Some of these hyphae are encrusted with zebra-like incrustations.

=== Similar species ===
In the field, C. scoticus looks like C. trossingenensis, but the latter has small (4.5 to 5.5 by 4 to 4.5 μm), subglobose (nearly or imperfectly globe-shaped) spores.

== Ecology ==
Cortinarius scoticus is found in mesic and damp pine-dominated forests. It is known from central and northern Europe.
