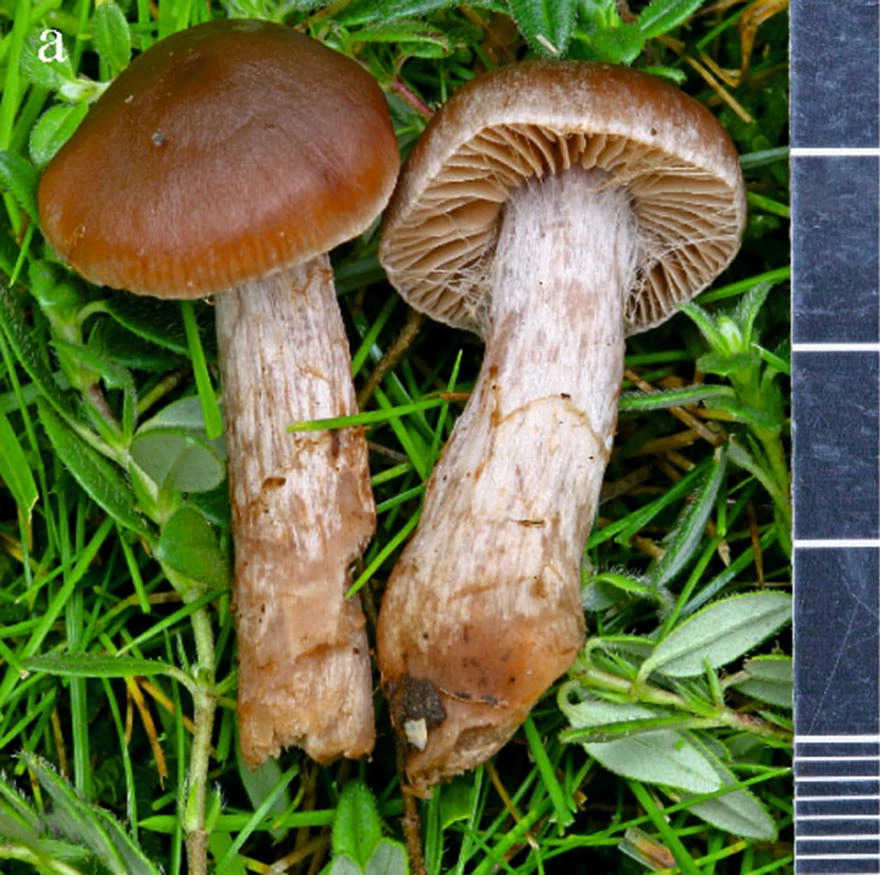
- Type specimen
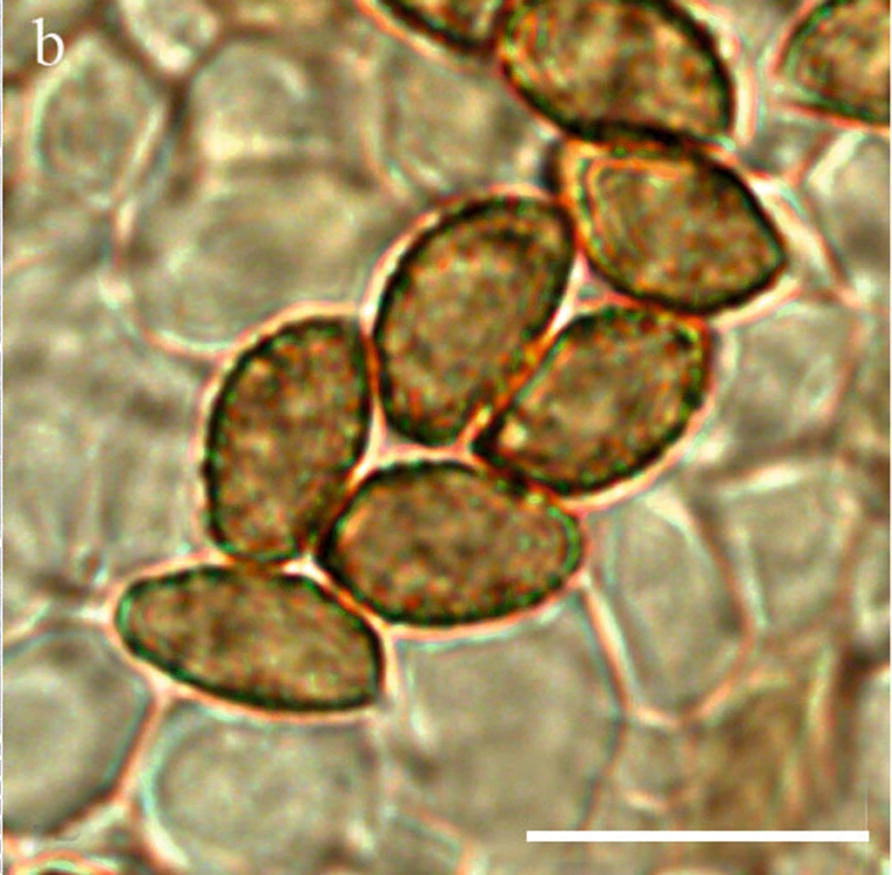
- Spores

Scientific classification
- Domain: Eukaryota
- Kingdom: Fungi
- Division: Basidiomycota
- Class: Agaricomycetes
- Order: Agaricales
- Family: Cortinariaceae
- Genus: Cortinarius
- Species: C. ainsworthii

Binomial name
- Cortinarius ainsworthii Liimat. & Niskanen (2020)

= Cortinarius ainsworthii =

Species of fungus

Cortinarius ainsworthii is a species of webcap. It is known from central and Northern Europe, where it grows in a variety of habitats. The species was first described in 2020, and was named in honour of the mycologist A. Martyn Ainsworth. Along with five other British webcaps, C. ainsworthii was selected by Kew Gardens as a highlight of taxa described by the organisation's staff and affiliates in 2020.

== Taxonomy ==
Cortinarius ainsworthii was described in a 2020 research note in the journal Fungal Diversity by Kare Liimatainen and Tuula Niskanen. The description was based on a collection made by A. Martyn Ainsworth in 2017 in Devil's Dyke, near Brighton, England. The specific name honours Ainsworth. Phylogenetic analysis placed the species in Cortinarius sect. Bovini.

Collections previously identified as C. rheubarbarinus match with C. ainsworthii, though the type specimen of C. rheubarbarinus does not. A published ITS sequence of the type specimen of C. hydrobivelus matches with C. ainsworthii, but Liimatainen and Niskanen's unpublished sequencing of the specimen does not. Instead, it matches C. armeniacus. Based on this analysis, as well as morphological and ecological factors, Liimatainen and Niskanen concluded that C. hydrobivelus was a synonym of C. armeniacus, leaving their species (now described as C. ainsworthii) lacking a valid name.

C. britannicus was one of over 150 botanical and mycological taxa described by staff or affiliates of Kew Gardens in 2020. In a year-end round-up, Kew scientists selected ten highlights, one of which was six newly described British Cortinarius species: C. ainsworthii described from Brighton; C. britannicus from Caithness; C. scoticus and C. aurae from the Black Wood of Rannoch; C. subsaniosus from Cumbria; and C. heatherae from Heathrow Airport. In a press release, Kew identified Cortinarius species as "ecologically important in supporting the growth of plants, particularly trees such as oak, beech, birch and pine" and playing "a key role in the carbon cycling of woodlands and providing nitrogen to trees".

== Description ==
Cortinarius ainsworthii produces mushrooms with caps that are 1.5 to 6.5 centimetres (0.6 to 3 in) wide. They are at first convex, later plano-convex, and brown. The cap's margin features whitish fibrils. The cap is hygrophanous, drying up in a zone at the centre to a pale ochraceous brown. The gills are medium-spaced, and adnexed (narrowly attached to the stalk) to emarginate (narrowly attached to the stem though shallower at the attachment). The gills are at first pale brown, later darkening. The edge of the gill, at least when young, is paler. The stem is 3 to 8 centimetres (1 to 3 in) long and cylindrical to somewhat club-shaped. At the apex, it is 0.6 to 1.1 centimetres (0.2 to 0.4 in) thick and, at the base, it is 0.8 to 1.3 centimetres (0.3 to 0.5 in) wide. The stem is initially covered in whitish silky fibrils, though becomes pale brownish with age, especially at the base. The flesh is marbled hygrophanous; in the cap it is brown, in stem paler. The universal veil is white, rather sparse or more abundant and forming some incomplete girdles on the stem. The gills have no distinct odour.

=== Microscopic characteristics ===
Cortinarius answorthii has basidiospores that measure 8 to 9.5 by 5 to 5.8 micrometres (μm), averaging 8.7 by 5.3 μm. The spores are almond-shaped, and are moderately to strongly warty. The spores are moderately dextrinoid, meaning that they stain reddish to reddish-brown when treated with Melzer's reagent or Lugol's solution. The club-shaped basidia measure 27 to 39 by 7 to 9 μm, and have four sterigmata. The hyphae in the flesh of the gills are golden brown, smooth with a few spot-like encrustations. The surface of the pileipellis is pale, consisting of parallel hyphae. These measure 5.5 to 8.5 μm in width, and are smooth with a few spot-like incrustations. Lower cells are pale brown, measuring 17 to 31 by 11 to 15.5 μm. They are smooth with a few spot-like encrustations.

=== Similar species ===
Cortinarius ainsworthi is a medium-sized species of C. sect. Bovini. It can be distinguished from closely related species by the combination of brown cap; almond-shaped, medium-sized spores (averaging 8.7 by 5.3 μm), and its habitat in deciduous forests on calcareous ground.

== Ecology ==
Cortinarius ainsworthii can be found in deciduous forests (perhaps associating with oaks, hazels, and beeches) on calcareous ground, also in open, grazed areas, presumably with rock roses. It is known from temperate to hemiboreal areas in central and northern Europe.
