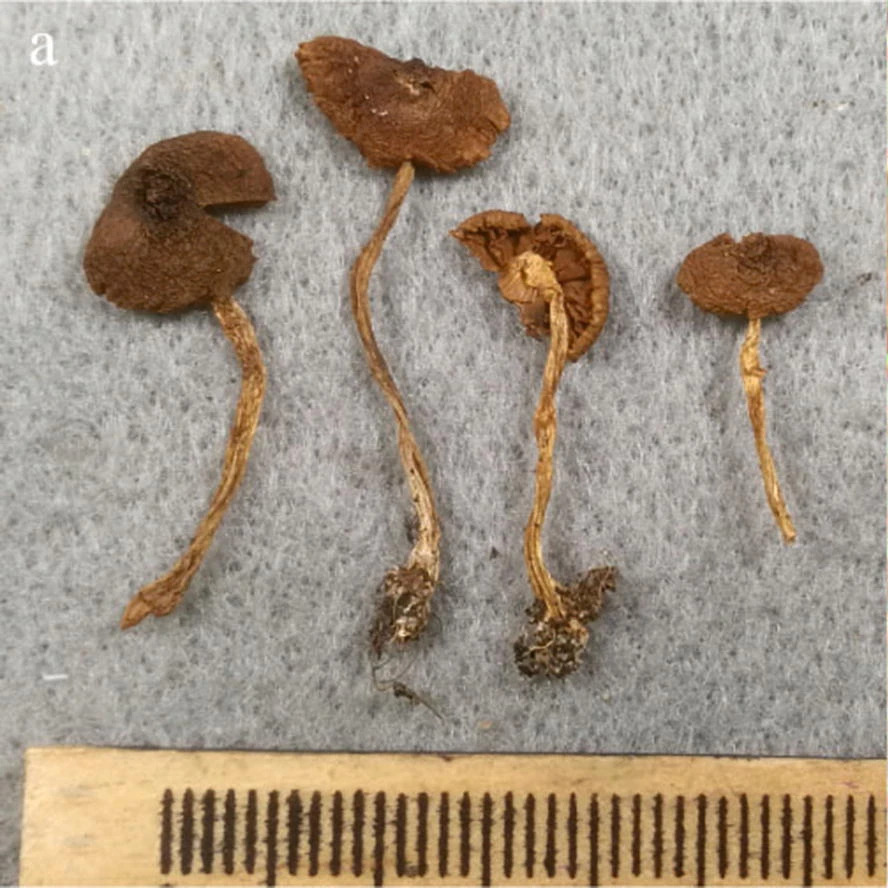
- Type specimen
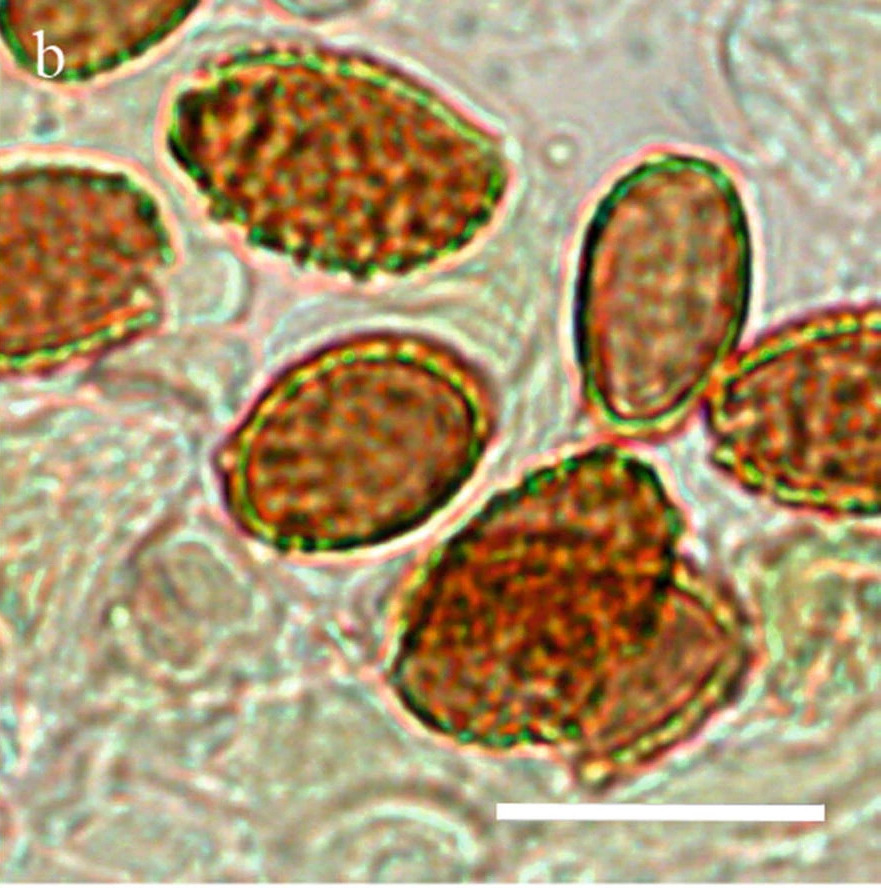
- Spores

Scientific classification
- Kingdom: Fungi
- Division: Basidiomycota
- Class: Agaricomycetes
- Order: Agaricales
- Family: Cortinariaceae
- Genus: Cortinarius
- Species: C. subsaniosus

Binomial name
- Cortinarius subsaniosus Liimat. & Niskanen (2020)

= Cortinarius subsaniosus =

Species of fungus

Cortinarius subsaniosus is a species of webcap mushroom known from north and central Europe, where it grows on sandy soil in association with willows. It produces small yellowish brown mushrooms. The species was described in 2020 by Kare Liimatainen and Tuula Niskanen. Its name refers to its affinity to C. saniosus, to which it is closely related. Along with five other British webcaps, C. subsaniosus was selected by Kew Gardens as a highlight of taxa described by the organisation's staff and affiliates in 2020.

== Taxonomy ==
Cortinarius subsaniosus was described in a 2020 research note in the journal Fungal Diversity by Kare Liimatainen and Tuula Niskanen. The description was based on a collection made by S. E. Evans in 1999 at Sandscale Haws, a nature reserve near Barrow-in-Furness, Cumbria, England. The specific name refers to the affinity the mushrooms have to C. saniosus. Phylogentic analysis places the species in sect. Saniosi of the genus Cortinarius, along with C. saniosus, C. aureovelatus, C. chrysomallus, and C. aureomarginatus. It has been described as part of the Cortinarius sansiosus species complex in Cortinarius subgenus Telamonia.

Cortinarius subsaniosus was one of over 150 botanical and mycological taxa described by staff or affiliates of Kew Gardens in 2020. In a year-end round-up, Kew scientists selected ten highlights, one of which was six newly described British Cortinarius species: C. subsaniosus described from Cumbria; C. britannicus from Caithness; C. scoticus and C. aurae from the Black Wood of Rannoch; C. ainsworthii from Brighton; and C. heatherae from Heathrow Airport. In a press release, Kew identified Cortinarius species as "ecologically important in supporting the growth of plants, particularly trees such as oak, beech, birch and pine" and playing "a key role in the carbon cycling of woodlands and providing nitrogen to trees".

== Description ==
Cortinarius subsaniosus has a cap that is 0.7 to 1.5 centimetres (0.3 to 0.6 in) wide, at first cone-shaped to somewhat convex, later convex to planoconvex (flat on one side, convex on the other) with a pointed umbo. The caps are yellowish brown, often dark brown at the centre, and are hygrophanous. The gills are brown and medium spaced. The stem is 2 to 4 centimetres (0.8 to 2 in) long, 0.15 to 0.3 centimetres (0.06 to 0.1 in) thick at the apex. They are cylindrical, and yellowish brown. The flesh is generally yellowish brown, though dark brown at the base of the stem. There is a yellow universal veil forming distinct complete and incomplete girdle-like structures on the stem. There is no distinct odour.

=== Microscopic characteristics ===
The ellipsoid to almond-shaped basidiospores are 9.5 to 11 by 6 to 7 micrometres (μm), averaging 10.2 by 6.1 μm. The spores are very warty, especially at their apices. The spores are moderately dextrinoid, meaning that they stain a reddish brown when tested with Melzer's reagent or Lugol's solution. The club-shaped basidia are 25 to 35 by 9 to 11 μm, sporting four sterigmata. The hyphae in the flesh of the gills are golden and are mainly smooth with a few spot-like encrustations. The pileipellis is rusty brown. It consists of more or less parallel hyphae that are 5 to 8 μm wide, densely encrusted with zebra-striped incrustations.

=== Similar species ===
Cortinarius subsaniosus is reminiscent of C. saniosus, though the latter has somewhat smaller spores, measuring 8.5 to 10 by 5 to 6.5 μm.

== Ecology ==
Cortinarius subsaniosus associates with trees, including at least willows (Salix), but perhaps others. Collections have been made in the United Kingdom, Denmark, Estonia, Norway, Sweden, and Finland. It appears to be rare inland.
