= Cortinarius viscoviridis =

Scientific classification
- Kingdom: Fungi
- Division: Basidiomycota
- Class: Agaricomycetes
- Order: Agaricales
- Family: Cortinariaceae
- Genus: Cortinarius
- Species: C. viscoviridis

Binomial name
- Cortinarius viscoviridis E.Horak

Species of fungus

Cortinarius viscoviridis is a basidiomycete fungus of the genus Cortinarius native to New Zealand, where it grows under Nothofagus and Leptospermum scoparium.
