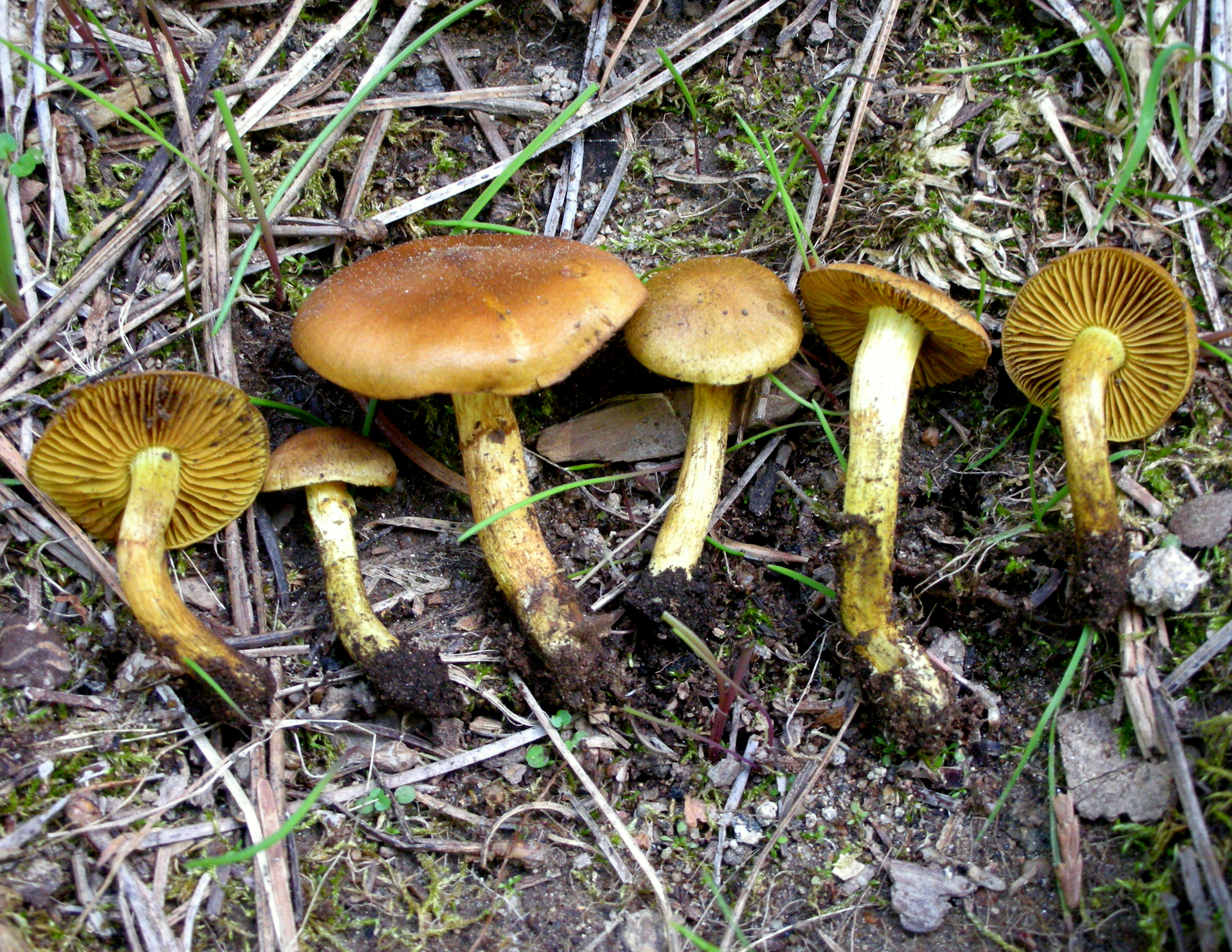

Scientific classification
- Domain: Eukaryota
- Kingdom: Fungi
- Division: Basidiomycota
- Class: Agaricomycetes
- Order: Agaricales
- Family: Cortinariaceae
- Genus: Cortinarius
- Species: C. thiersii

Binomial name
- Cortinarius thiersii Ammirati & A.H.Sm. (1977)

= Cortinarius thiersii =

Species of fungus

Cortinarius thiersii is a basidiomycete fungus of the genus Cortinarius native to North America.

== See also ==
- List of Cortinarius species
