= Cortinarius bovinatus =

Scientific classification
- Domain: Eukaryota
- Kingdom: Fungi
- Division: Basidiomycota
- Class: Agaricomycetes
- Order: Agaricales
- Family: Cortinariaceae
- Genus: Cortinarius
- Species: C. bovinatus

Binomial name
- Cortinarius bovinatus Kytöv., Liimat., Niskanen & H.Lindstr. (2013)

Species of mushroom-forming fungus

Cortinarius bovinatus is an agaric fungus in the family Cortinariaceae. Described as new to science in 2013, it is found in calcareous coniferous woodlands of northern Europe.

== Taxonomy ==
Cortinarius bovinatus was described as a new species in 2013 by Ilkka Kytövöuri, Kare Liimatainen, Tuula Niskanen, and Håkan Lindström following a combined analysis of morphology and DNA sequences (rDNA ITS and rpb2 regions). It falls within section Bovini, a group of similar brown Cortinarius taxa associated with fir and spruce forests. The specific epithet bovinatus alludes to its close resemblance to Cortinarius bovinus. The holotype was collected on 22 August 2007 in a mixed spruce–birch woodland on calcareous soil near Runteli, Tornio, Finland.

== Description ==
The cap (pileus) measures 3.5–8 cm across, initially hemispherical before flattening, often with a shallow central bump (umbo). Its surface is weakly fibrillose (covered in fine fibres) and reddish‐brown to greyish‐brown, becoming yellowish‐brown on drying (hygrophanous). The closely spaced lamellae (gills) are emarginate (notched near the stipe) and turn from pale grey‑brown to dark reddish‑brown with age; the edge remains slightly paler. The stipe (stem) is 6–14 cm tall, clavate (club‑shaped) and initially covered in whitish fibrils, darkening on handling.

A thin veil leaves a temporary sheath or girdle on the stipe. The flesh is evenly brown, darkening at the stipe base, and emits a faint raphanoid (radish‑like) odour. Under the microscope, the almond‑to‑ellipsoid spores measure 8.4–10.4 by 5.7–6.6 μm (average 9.3–10.0 by 5.9–6.3 μm; Q = length/width 1.44–1.67) and are moderately dextrinoid (turning reddish‑brown in Melzer's reagent).

== Habitat and distribution ==
Cortinarius bovinatus fruits in late August to late September in mesic to dry calcareous forests dominated by Picea (spruce) or Pinus (pine). It is known only from Sweden and Finland, where it remains uncommon, and is typically found on base‑rich soils often near limestone outcrops. In the 2019 Finnish red list, it was classified as "data deficient".

== See also ==
- List of Cortinarius species
