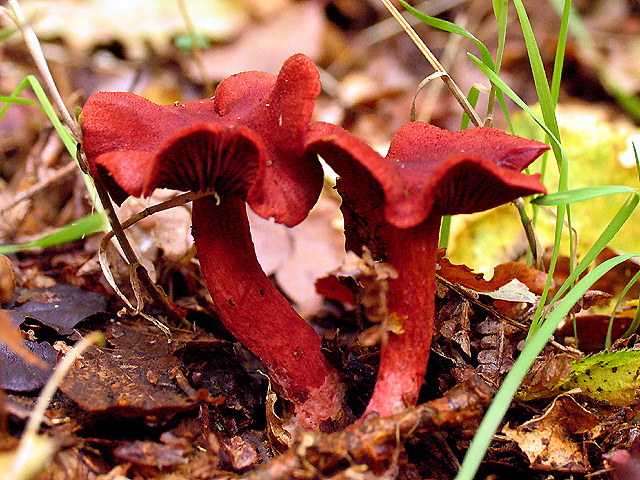

Scientific classification
- Kingdom: Fungi
- Division: Basidiomycota
- Class: Agaricomycetes
- Order: Agaricales
- Family: Cortinariaceae
- Genus: Cortinarius
- Species: C. puniceus

Binomial name
- Cortinarius puniceus P.D.Orton (1958)

= Cortinarius puniceus =

Species of fungus

Cortinarius puniceus is a species of fungus in the genus Cortinarius. It is closely related to Cortinarius sanguineus, which grows under conifers.

== See also ==
- List of Cortinarius species
