= Cortinarius cacaocolor =

Scientific classification
- Domain: Eukaryota
- Kingdom: Fungi
- Division: Basidiomycota
- Class: Agaricomycetes
- Order: Agaricales
- Family: Cortinariaceae
- Genus: Cortinarius
- Species: C. cacaocolor

Binomial name
- Cortinarius cacaocolor A.H. Smith

Species of fungus

Cortinarius cacaocolor is an inedible species of fungus in the genus Cortinarius. It is native to North America.
