= Cortinarius microarcheri =

Scientific classification
- Kingdom: Fungi
- Division: Basidiomycota
- Class: Agaricomycetes
- Order: Agaricales
- Family: Cortinariaceae
- Genus: Cortinarius
- Species: C. microarcheri

Binomial name
- Cortinarius microarcheri Cleland

Species of fungus

Cortinarius microarcheri is a basidiomycete fungus of the genus Cortinarius native to South and Western Australia, where it grows under Eucalyptus.
