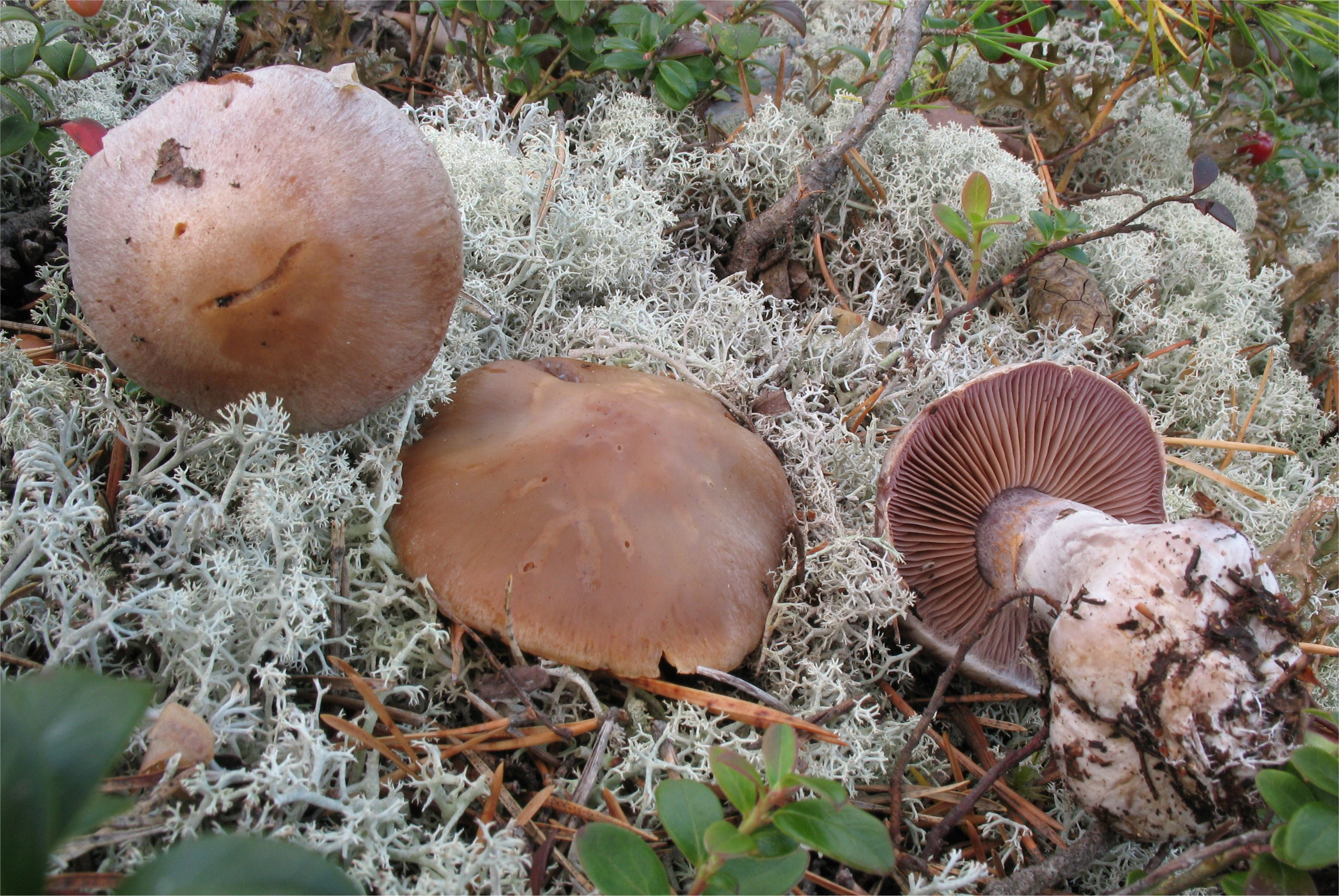
- In Torrböle, Ångermanland, Sweden

Scientific classification
- Domain: Eukaryota
- Kingdom: Fungi
- Division: Basidiomycota
- Class: Agaricomycetes
- Order: Agaricales
- Family: Cortinariaceae
- Genus: Cortinarius
- Species: C. quarciticus

Binomial name
- Cortinarius quarciticus H.Lindstr. (1994)

= Cortinarius quarciticus =

Species of fungus

Cortinarius quarciticus is an agaric fungus of the genus Cortinarius found in Europe. It was described as new to science in 1994.

== See also ==
- List of Cortinarius species
