= Cortinarius verecundus =

Scientific classification
- Domain: Eukaryota
- Kingdom: Fungi
- Division: Basidiomycota
- Class: Agaricomycetes
- Order: Agaricales
- Family: Cortinariaceae
- Genus: Cortinarius
- Species: C. verecundus

Binomial name
- Cortinarius verecundus E. Horak 1990

Species of fungus

Cortinarius verecundus is a basidiomycete fungus of the genus Cortinarius native to New Caledonia, where it grows under Nothofagus.

== See also ==
- List of Cortinarius species
