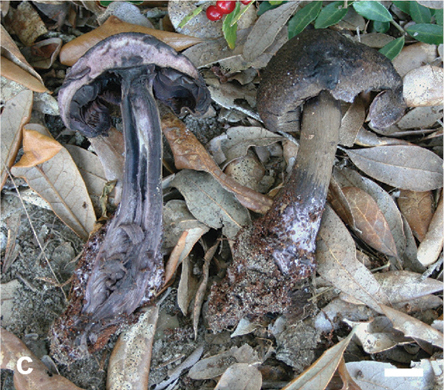

Scientific classification
- Kingdom: Fungi
- Division: Basidiomycota
- Class: Agaricomycetes
- Order: Agaricales
- Family: Cortinariaceae
- Genus: Cortinarius
- Species: C. atrotomentosus

Binomial name
- Cortinarius atrotomentosus Harrower

= Cortinarius atrotomentosus =

Species of fungus

Cortinarius atrotomentosus is a recently discovered basidiomycete within the family Cortinariaceae. Formally described in 2015 by Emma Harrower and her colleagues in the Apalachicola National Forest in Florida, it is known for its distinct dark purple coloration and ectomycorrhizal association to the southern live oak (Quercus virginiana).

== Taxonomy and phylogeny ==
=== Discovery ===
Cortinarius atrotomentosus was first officially described in 2015 by Emma Harrower and her colleagues in a publication on five new species of fungi in genus Cortinarius. Currently, there are no current synonyms or common names for these fungi due to its recent discovery. The Latin name atrotomentosus was derived from the roots "Atro" meaning "black" and "tomentose" meaning "covered with densely matted wooly hair" in reference to the dark coloration of the fruiting bodies.

The initial collection of this fungus happened on December 4, 2010, under the collector number TFB 13848 from the Apalachicola National Forest in Crawfordville, Florida. The specimen was then dried and cataloged as holotype (TENN 065527) in the University of Tennessee Herbarium until later investigation by Emma Harrower and her colleagues.

=== Classification ===
According to taxonomy, Cortinarius atrotomentosus belongs to kingdom Fungi, phylum Basidiomycota due to its spore production on clublike structures called basidia. Further classification puts these fungi in class Agaricomycetes, a large group of mushroom producing fungi characterized by cap like fruiting body with gills. This reasoning also places C. atrotomentosus in order Agaricales, the gilled mushrooms. Additional description of the mycorrhizal connections and presence of cortinae, a partial veil structure, places this species in genus Cortinarius.

=== Phylogenetic studies ===
Molecular phylogenetic studies on genus Cortinarius allowed for identification of Cortinarius atrotomentosus by distinguishing it from Cortinarius violaceus, a lookalike relative with a dark purple appearance and ectomycorrhizal connections. Methods using DNA extraction, PCR amplification, and ITS, 28S, and RPB2 region sequencing were used to examine the relationship between species within Cortinarius in Harrower et al. (2015). Distinct DNA sequences at position 71 (ITS1) and 606 (ITS2) were present after sequencing. Results of a maximum likelihood phylogenetic tree revealed C. palatinus as the closest relative.

Maximum likelihood phylogenetic tree showing the placement of Cortinarius atrotomentosus within the genus Cortinarius.

== Morphology ==
=== Macroscopic ===
Pileus (cap) measure 26–91 mm wide, dry, tomentose to fine scaly in texture, dark violet pigmentation (17F3) in young fruiting bodies and brown with age (7F3). Lamella (gills) adnexed, intermediately spaced, dark violet, thin and ventricose. Stipe (stem) measure 75–131 mm in long, 8-18mm thick at apex, 17–26 mm thick at base, ventricose, smooth, olive brown (4E6) in young fruiting bodies and brownish gray (5D2) with age. Context (flesh) range from grayish purple (13E2) to reddish brown (10D4). Mycelium range from light purple (16B4) to grayish magenta (14D3).

Cortinarius atrotomentosus has mild smell and taste.

=== Microscopic ===
Basidia measure 20-30 x 10-12 µm with a four spored structure. Basidospores measure (9) 10.5-13 (-14.0) µm x (6-) 7-8 µm, mean measurement 10.5 – 12 µm x 6-8 µm, ellipsoid to amygdaloid shaped, spore quotient mean measurement 1.50-1.53, verrucose appearance (warty), plage visible on surface under scanning electron microscope, sampled across seventy spores in three specimens. Produces rusty brown spore print. Cystidia (sterile cell) examination shows Cheilocystidia (on the edge of gills) present, spindle (fusiform) to flask (lageniform) shaped, 50-70 (–80) µm x 15-25 µm. Pleurocystidia (on surface of gills) present, spindle (fusiform) to flask, 43–65 (–70) x 15–20 µm. No caulocystidia (on stalk) present. Pileipellis (cap surface) is trichoderm (has upright facing hyphae), multiseptated hyphae, 6-20 µm wide x 185-370 µm tall. Terminal ends blunt, lanceolate (long and tapering), and aciculate (needle like). Clamp connections are present.

=== Comparison ===
Comparison of morphological characteristics of Cortinarius atrotomentosus to its relatives, Cortinarius palatinus and Cortinarius violaceus can be difficult as species within genus Cortinarius can share coloration, texture, and gill similarities. Therefore, macroscopic and microscopic traits can be used to distinguish the species.

Trait	C. atrotomentosus	C. violaceus	C. palatinus
Pileus	26–91 mm wide, dry, tomentose to fine scaly in texture, dark violet pigmentation (17F3) when young and brown with age.	30–50 mm wide, dry, squamulose to tomentose, dark violet when young and brown with age (color code not specified).	30–50 mm wide, dry, dark purple pigmentation (15C5–8, 15D5–8, 15E5–8, 16C5–8, 16D5–8, 16E5–8), squamulose lying flat towards outer edges and upright in center.
Gills	Adnexed, intermediately spaced, dark violet, thin and ventricose.	Adnexed to adnate, intermediate spacing, dark purple. Shape not specified.	Adnexed, closely spaced, same pigmentation as pileus, uneven edges.
Stipe	75–131 mm in long, 8-18mm thick at apex, 17–26 mm thick at base, ventricose, smooth, olive brown (4E6) in young fruiting bodies and brownish gray (5D2) with age.	60–160 mm long, 20 mm thick, uniform width, slightly swollen base fibrillose, purple when young to black or brown with age (color code not specified).	80–120 mm long, 10–14 mm thick, uniform width, slightly swollen base, fibrillose, ranging from violet in upper half to pale violet in lower half (15C5–8, 15D5–8, 15E5–8, 16C5–8, 16D5–8, 16E5–8).
Spore Print	Rusty Brown	Rusty Brown	Rusty Brown
Basidia	20-30 x 10-12 µm, four spored structures.	40-60 x 13-16 microns, four spored structures.	(20–) 30–40 × 10–15 µm, two to four spored structures
Basidiospores	10.5-13 (-14.0) µm x (6-) 7-8 µm, ellipsoid to amygdaloid shaped, verrucose, plage visible on surface.	11.5–14.5 (–18) x 7–9 µm, ellipsoid to amygdaloid, verrucose, plage visible on surface.	11–15 µm × 7–9.5 µm, amygdaloid shaped, verrucose, plage visible on surface
Cystidia	Abundant cheilocystidia measured 50-70 (–80) µm x 15-25 µm and pleurocystidia measured 43–65 (–70) x 15–20 µm present. Caulocystidia are absent.	Pleurocystidia and Cheilocystidia present up to 80 x 25 µm. Caulocystidia present measured 47-80 x 15-25 microns.	Reduced cheilocystidia measured (35–) 60–95 (–100) µm × (11–) 13–25 (–30) µm, and abundant pleurocystidia measured (40–) 50–80 (–105) µm × (10–) 15–25 (–40) µm present. Caulocystidia are absent.
Pileipellis	trichoderm	trichoderm	trichoderm
Pileipellis Hyphae	6-20 µm wide by 185-370 µm tall, multiseptated, terminal ends blunt, lanceolate and aciculate.	6-22 µm wide, gelatinized hyphae sometimes present 2-11 µm wide. Hyphae septation and shape are unspecified.	Up to 20 µm wide, unknown height, multiseptated, terminal ends blunt, aciculate
Clamp Connections	Present.	Present.	Present.

Information is primarily collected from Harrower et al. (2015), additional sourced are cited within table.

== Ecology ==
=== Trophic mode ===
Cortinarius atrotomentosus has been found to have ectomycorrhizal connections to tree hosts. A characteristic of genus Cortinarius. Unlike saprotrophic fungi that get their energy from dead organic matter, ectomycorrhizal fungi will form a mutually beneficial symbiotic relationship with a plant host to receive sugars that will be used as energy. Typically, this process happens as hyphae form a mantle around plant roots, eventually penetrating the epidermis to form a branched structure called a Hartig net. Through this internal hyphal structure, photosynthesized sugars needed for fungi metabolic processes can be exchanged for necessary plant nutrients absorbed by fungi.

=== Hosts ===
All documented ectomycorrhizal relationships with Cortinarius atrotomentosus have been associated with the Southern Live Oak (Quercus virginiana). Q. virginiana is a well-known semi evergreen tree growing along the coastal plain of the southeastern United States. With preference for low-lying areas, Q. virginiana thrives alongside creeks, rivers, lakes, and periodically flooded land but can also tolerate upland sites, agriculture land, or pine forests with reduced wildfires. Because C. atrotomentosus has exclusively been observed as a symbiont to Q. virginiana, this oak is functions as its only currently documented host.

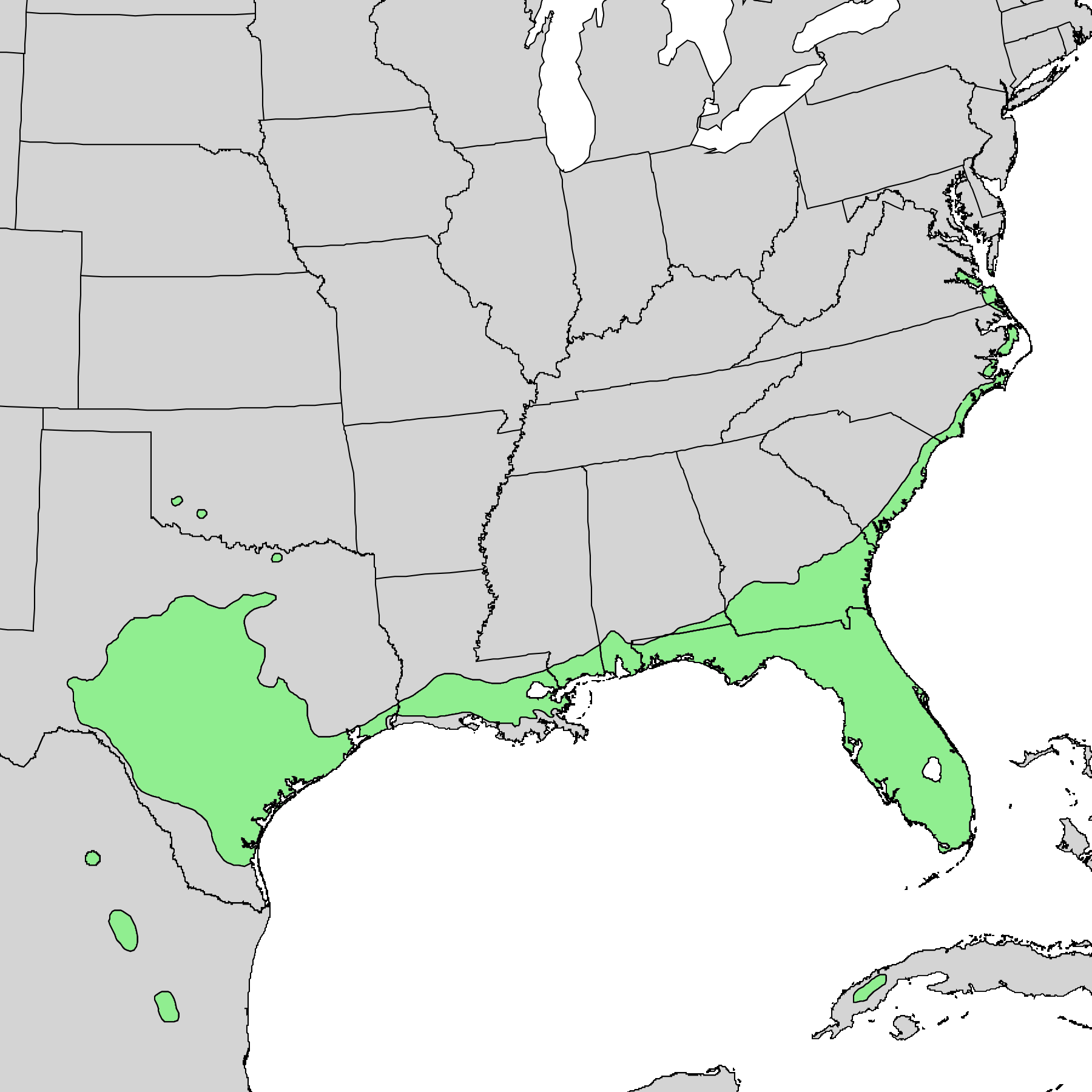
Native distribution of Q. virginiana in southeastern United States.

=== Microhabitat ===
The symbiotic nature of Cortinarius atrotomentosus with Quercus virginiana can play a role in understanding the habitat this fungus requires. Typically, live oaks are highly adaptable and will grow in soil zones 7B through 10B, in moist acidic sand, loam, or clay. According to the USDA Plant Hardiness Zone map, specific to Florida, this means the tree can withstand temperatures down to 15 degrees Fahrenheit. C. atrotomentosus known ECM correlation to Q. virginiana subtropical habitat indicates that the geographic distribution of this fungi as exclusive to the southeastern United States.

== Overall biology and relevance for humans ==
=== Ecological relevance ===
Due to Cortinarius atrotomentosus association with Quercus virginiana as an ectomycorrhizal fungus, significant contributions are made to the forest ecosystem by supporting plant growth, promoting diversity, preventing soil erosion, and detoxifying pollutants. Specific to Q. virginiana, C. atrotomentosus improves tree survival rates by making necessary plant nutrients like nitrogen, carbon, and phosphorus available. During times of drought stress, ECM fungi have also been known to improve water uptake and retention. As the plant increases in biomass, roots will extend outward with hyphal networks, forming a stable soil structure that is more resistant to soil erosion. Soil quality will also improve in the presence of ECM fungi through the ability to reduce heavy metals through immobilization and storage, preventing potential damage to trees. The physical oak tree structure additionally provides a habitat for many botanical organisms such as ferns, mosses, lichens, orchids, and various animals species of insects, spiders, and lizards. Acorns produced from Q. virginiana serve as an essential food source for various bird species (blue jays, woodpeckers, crows) and mammal species (deer, hogs, squirrels, and black bears) due to the low tannin content. Species of which significantly contribute to the efficiently, diversity, and health of ecosystems in the southeastern area of the United States. Because of ectomycorrhizal relationship built between species, C. atrotomentosus directly contributes to the survival and health of Q. virginiana.

=== Human importance ===
Species within genus Cortinarius often contains a nephrotoxin (orellanine) that causes kidney failure. Because individual species are hard to distinguish from each other, high risk of misidentification and known toxicity have prevented any culinary or medicinal interest for the public. Historically, the fungi in genus Corinarius have been used to as a natural dye source to produce red and orange colors on wool. No documentation has been made regarding C. atrotomentosus used to as a natural dye.

Indirectly, the fungi ECM relationship improvements to the survival of Quercus virginiana supports shade and windbreak to buildings, other trees, and landscapes, specifically during harsh weather events. Benefits can also be found from reduced soil erosion that causes infrastructure failure.

== Biochemistry and cellular biology ==
Biological analysis at the cellular level has revealed typical features associated with dikaryotic Basidiomycota fungus. Multiseptated hyphae is present alongside clamp connections are present to maintain the dikaryotic state of Cortinarius atrotomentosus. Hyphae 6–20 µm wide and 185–370 µm high arranged in an upright position makes up the outer layer of the cap. Abundant cystidia, cheilocystidia and pleurocystidia, specifically present. These structures turned brown with application of KOH. Relative discovery of C. atrotomentosus has resulted in limited description of the cellular biology and biochemistry of the species.

== Existing images ==
Fruiting Body of C. atrotomentosus.

Scanning Electron Micrograph of C. atrotomentosus Basidiospores.

C. atrotomentosus Basidiospores in Light Micrograph.
