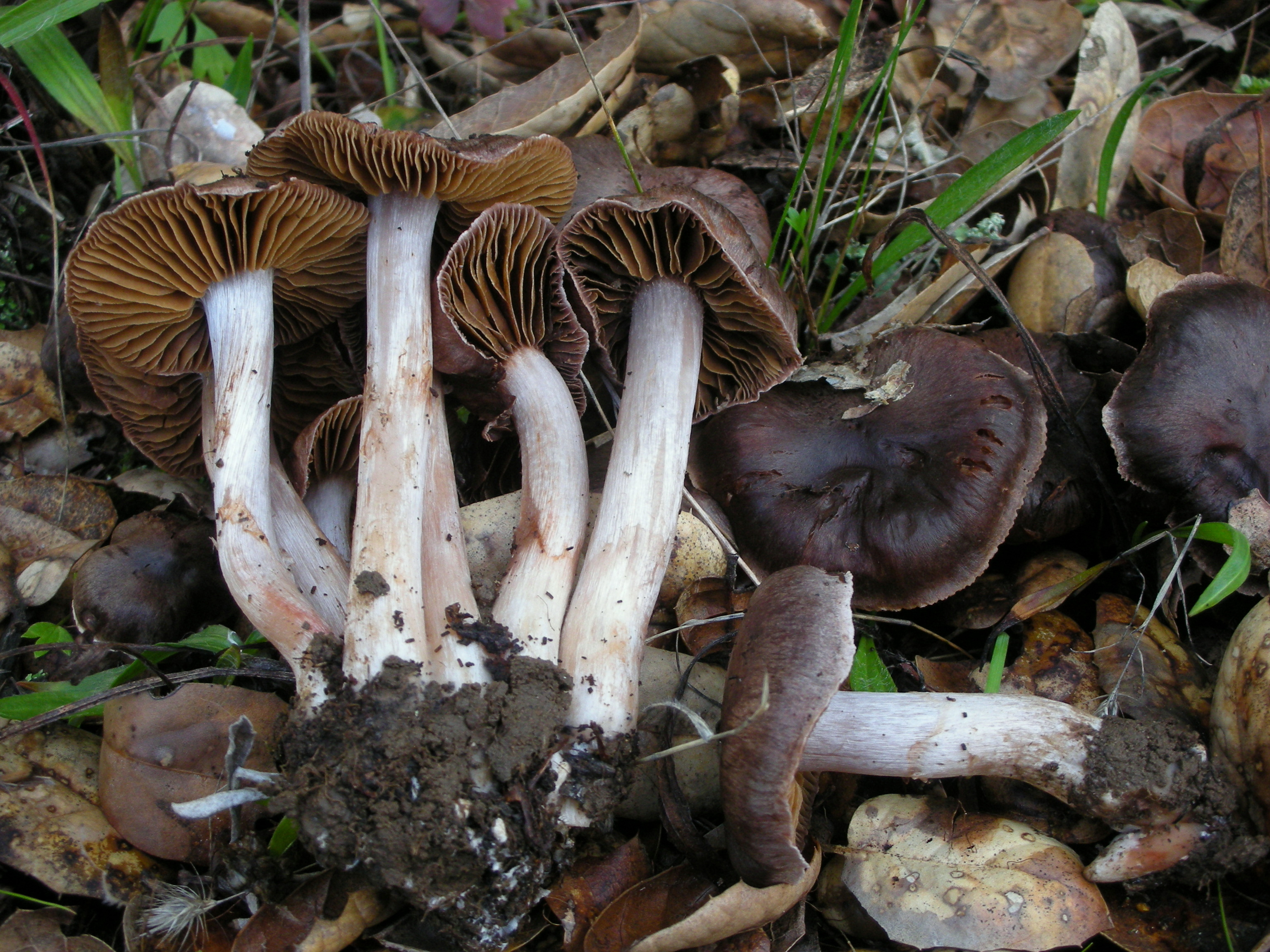

Scientific classification
- Domain: Eukaryota
- Kingdom: Fungi
- Division: Basidiomycota
- Class: Agaricomycetes
- Order: Agaricales
- Family: Cortinariaceae
- Genus: Cortinarius
- Species: C. ohlone

Binomial name
- Cortinarius ohlone Bojantchev (2013)

= Cortinarius ohlone =

Species of fungus

Cortinarius ohlone is a basidiomycete mushroom of the genus Cortinarius. Found in California, it was described as new to science in 2013 by Dimitar Bojantchev. The specific epithet refers to the Ohlone Native American people of California, who formerly inhabited the oak woods where the type collection was made.

The brownish cap is up to 8 centimetres (3 1/4 in) wide, and the gills are tannish. The stem is up to 10 cm (4 in) long and 2 cm (3/4 in) thick. The spore print is rusty brown. The flesh of the cap is brown, while that of the stem is whitish. It is similar to a number of other members of Cortinarius subgenus Telamonia.

From December to January, the species can be found on the ground under oak from Butte County to southern California.

== See also ==
- List of Cortinarius species
