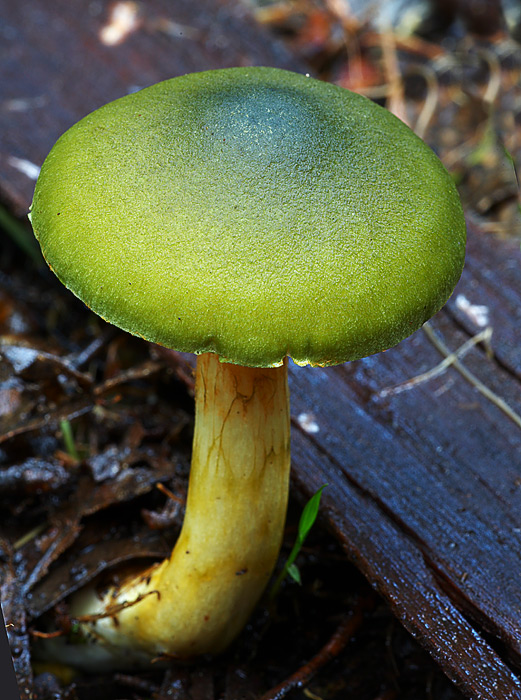

Scientific classification
- Kingdom: Fungi
- Division: Basidiomycota
- Class: Agaricomycetes
- Order: Agaricales
- Family: Cortinariaceae
- Genus: Cortinarius
- Species: C. austrovenetus

Binomial name
- Cortinarius austrovenetus Cleland (1928)

Synonyms
- Dermocybe austroveneta (Cleland) M.M.Moser & E.Horak (1975)

= Cortinarius austrovenetus =

Species of fungus

Cortinarius austrovenetus
- Mycological characteristics
- Gills on hymenium
- Cap is convex
- Hymenium is adnate
- Stipe has a cortina
- Spore print is brown
- Ecology is mycorrhizal
- Edibility is unknown

Cortinarius austrovenetus, alternately known as Dermocybe austroveneta and commonly known as the green skin-head but also known as green dermocybe is an inedible brightly coloured green gilled fungus that naturally occurs in south eastern Australia.

== Taxonomy ==
Initially described as Cortinarius austrovenetus by Australian naturalist John Burton Cleland in 1928, this mushroom along with many other members of the group was separated from the huge genus Cortinarius, and placed in the newer genus Dermocybe, commonly called skin-heads, derived from the meaning of their scientific names. However, this genus is often treated as a subgenus of Cortinarius only.

In 2007, Bruno Gasparini suggested that C. austrovenetus is the same species as another Cortinarius in subgenus Dermocybe, C. walkerae. If this is true, C. austrovenetus is a later synonym and the name C. walkerae would take precedence.

== Description ==
The fruit bodies of Cortinarius austrovenetus are smooth with a convex or flat cap that can be up to 8 centimetres (3 in) across.

The mushroom is easily recognized by its emerald green cap skin, yellow gills, and yellow-orange stipe. The pigment has been isolated and described as austrovenetin.

They have yellowy brown; adnate and moderately close gills underneath the cap. The stem can be up to 8 cm long and 1.5 cm in diameter. It is dry, smooth and yellow to yellowish ochre, paler in the upper half.

Like most members of the family Cortinariaceae this mushroom has a thin web-like veil (the cortina) protecting the gills in the early stages of growth. Remnants of this veil may be seen (often quite fleetingly) on the mature stipe.

== Distribution and habitat ==
Occurring particularly in Tasmania, Victoria, New South Wales, Western Australia, as well as South Australia, typically in eucalypt forests or woodlands. It is common to see a number of mushrooms growing near one another.

== Edibility ==
The edibility of this mushroom is unknown, and it should be avoided, as some of its close relatives contain lethal toxins.
