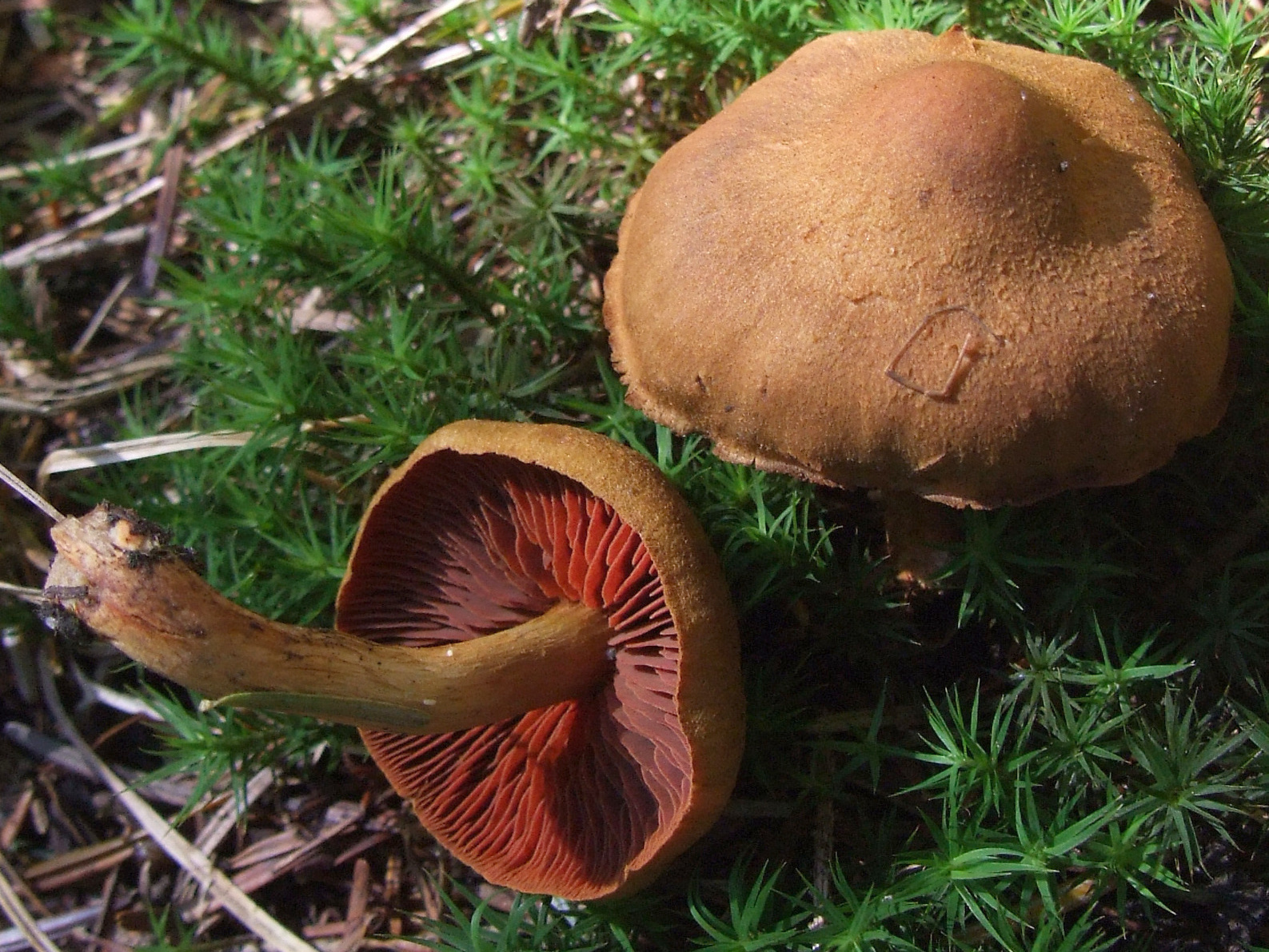
- Dermocybe semisanguinea

Scientific classification
- Kingdom: Fungi
- Division: Basidiomycota
- Class: Agaricomycetes
- Order: Agaricales
- Family: Cortinariaceae
- Genus: Dermocybe

= Dermocybe =

Genus of fungi

The fungi of the Dermocybe group, commonly known as skin-heads, form a group within the huge genus Cortinarius. They are generally considered to be a subgenus though some authorities consider them to form a genus in their own right.

They can be distinguished from other Cortinarius species by:

1. their brilliant colours, especially of the gills,
2. their non-hygrophanous dry cap, and
3. their dry cylindrical (non-bulbous) stem.

An example with a vivid green colour is Dermocybe austroveneta. Another example is D. semisanguinea (pictured), which from above is an ordinary brown colour, but which shows a striking blood-red sheen when the underside of the cap is viewed. Lethal webcaps, some of world's most poisonous mushrooms belong to the group.

The Austrian Professor Meinhard Moser (1924–2002), whose book is referenced, was one of the authorities who promote Dermocybe to the status of a genus.
