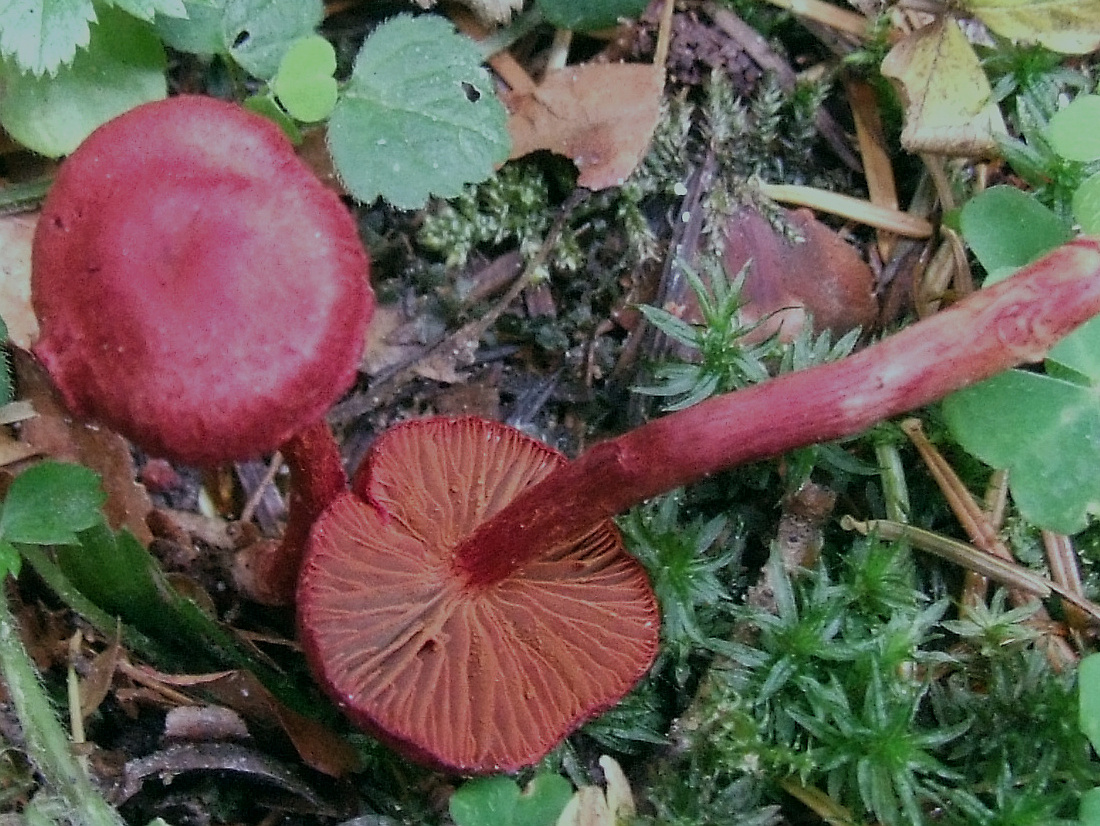

Scientific classification
- Domain: Eukaryota
- Kingdom: Fungi
- Division: Basidiomycota
- Class: Agaricomycetes
- Order: Agaricales
- Family: Cortinariaceae
- Genus: Cortinarius
- Species: C. sanguineus

Binomial name
- Cortinarius sanguineus (Wulfen) Gray (1821)

Synonyms
- Dermocybe sanguinea (Wulfen) Wünsche (1781)

= Cortinarius sanguineus =

Species of fungus

Cortinarius sanguineus Mycological characteristics
- Gills on hymenium
- Cap is convex
- Hymenium is adnate
- Stipe has a cortina
- Spore print is brown
- Ecology is mycorrhizal
- Edibility is unknown

Cortinarius sanguineus, commonly known as the blood red webcap or blood red cortinarius, is a species of fungus in the genus Cortinarius.

== Taxonomy ==
Austrian naturalist Franz Xaver von Wulfen described the species as Agaricus sanguineus in 1781, reporting that it appeared in the fir tree forests around Klagenfurt and Ebenthal and in October. He noted that it was very pretty but inedible. The specific epithet is the Latin word sanguineus, meaning "bloody". Samuel Frederick Gray established Cortinarius as a genus in 1821, recording the species as Cortinaria sanguinea "the bloody curtain-stool".

Friedrich Otto Wünsche described it as Dermocybe sanguinea in 1877. Most mycologists retain Dermocybe as merely a subgenus of Cortinarius as genetically all the species lie within the latter genus.

It is closely related to Cortinarius puniceus, which grows under oak and beech from England and France.

== Description ==
The dark blood-red cap is convex then flattening, 2–5 centimetres (3/4–2 in) wide, and covered in silky fibres. The stipe is coloured like the cap, cylindrical, 4–10 cm long, and 3–8 mm thick. The veil (cortina) and its remnants are red. The purple-red flesh has a fair to pleasant smell.

The gills are adnate, initially blood-red and turning brown as the spores mature. The spore print is rust-coloured. The oval spores measure 7 to 9 μm by 4 to 6 μm and are rough.

== Habitat ==
Cortinarius sanguineus grows in conifer woodlands in autumn.

== Uses ==
It is considered inedible, of unknown edibility, or edible.

Its pigment can be used as a dye for wool, rendering it shades of pink, purple or red. The major pigments in C. sanguineus are emodin, dermocybin and dermorubin.

== See also ==
- List of Cortinarius species
