= Fungal Diversity =

- Discipline: Mycology
- Language: English
- Edited by: Zhuliang Yang

Publication details
- History: 1998–present
- Publisher: BioAcademic Press
- Frequency: Irregular
- Impact factor: 20.3 (2022)

Standard abbreviations
- ISO 4: Fungal Divers.

Indexing
- ISSN: 1560-2745 (print); 1878-9129 (web)

Links
- Journal homepage; Online archive 1998-2009; Online archive 2010-2025

Fungal Diversity is an international journal which publishes papers spanning all facets of the field of mycology. It is a peer-reviewed scientific journal that covers the biodiversity, and systematic and molecular phylogeny of the fungi, including lichens. The coverage encompasses biodiversity, and systematic and molecular phylogeny. The content includes novel research articles and review articles, all of which are peer-reviewed. Fungal Diversity is the official journal of Kunming Institute of Botany of the Chinese Academy of Sciences, which is based in China.

== Publication Bias ==
From the 133 research articles published between January 2015 and April 2020, 62.4% (83) had at least one member of the editorial board within the authors and 51.1% (68) carried the name of the same researcher (Kevin D. Hyde) as an author.

Within the top 10 publishing authors in the journal (more than 22 articles published in the period above) only two are not members of the editorial board.

The journal self-citation is very high. On average per article 17.33 citations refer to another Fungal Diversity article, this number can be as high as 156 in an article published in 2017.

These actions help to inflate the impact factor of the journal without being caught by the scrutinizing agencies.
