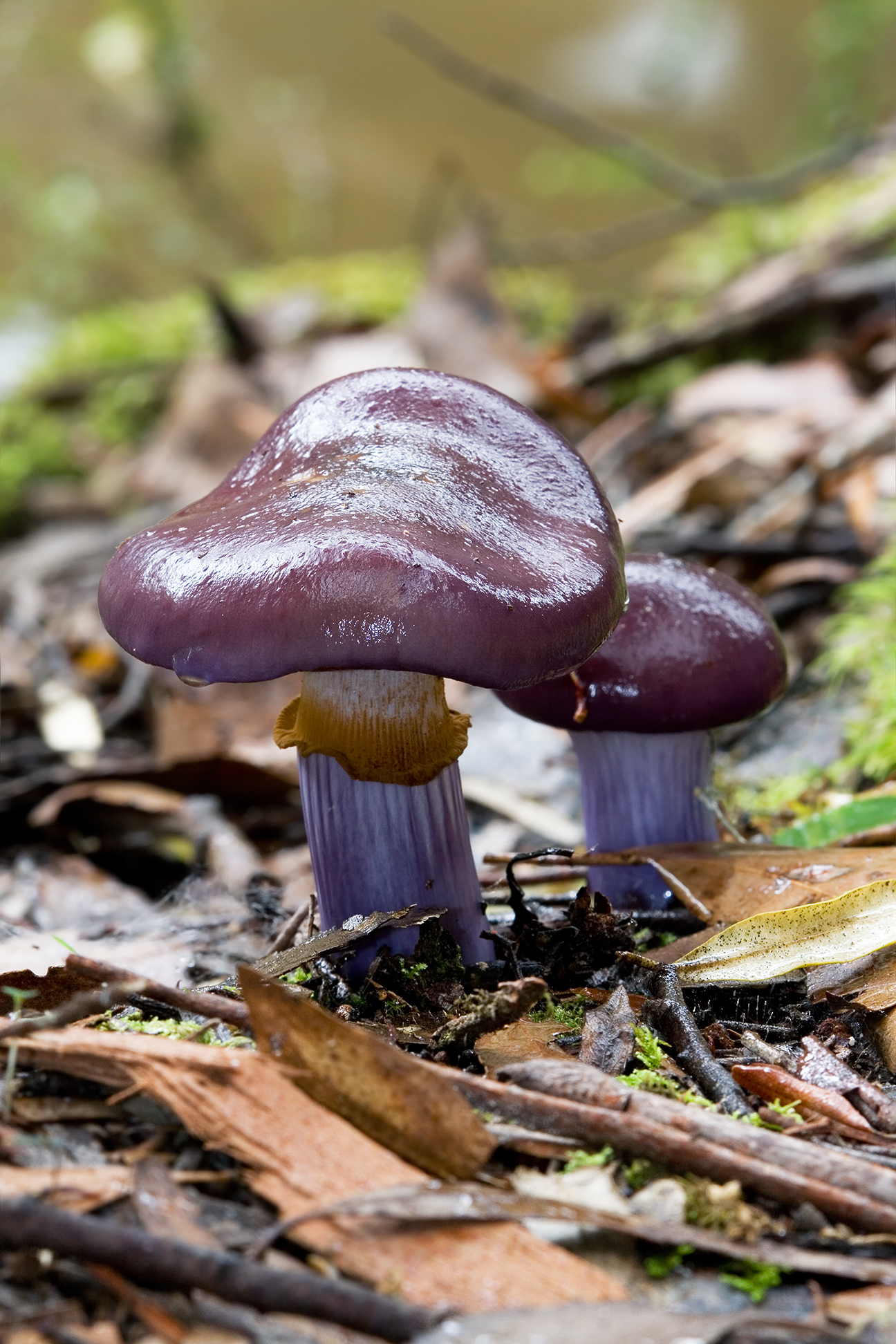
- Cortinarius archeri

Scientific classification
- Kingdom: Fungi
- Division: Basidiomycota
- Class: Agaricomycetes
- Order: Agaricales
- Family: Cortinariaceae
- Genus: Cortinarius (Pers.) Gray (1821)

Type species
- Cortinarius violaceus (L.) Gray (1821)

Diversity
- ca. 2700 species

= Cortinarius =

Genus of mushrooms

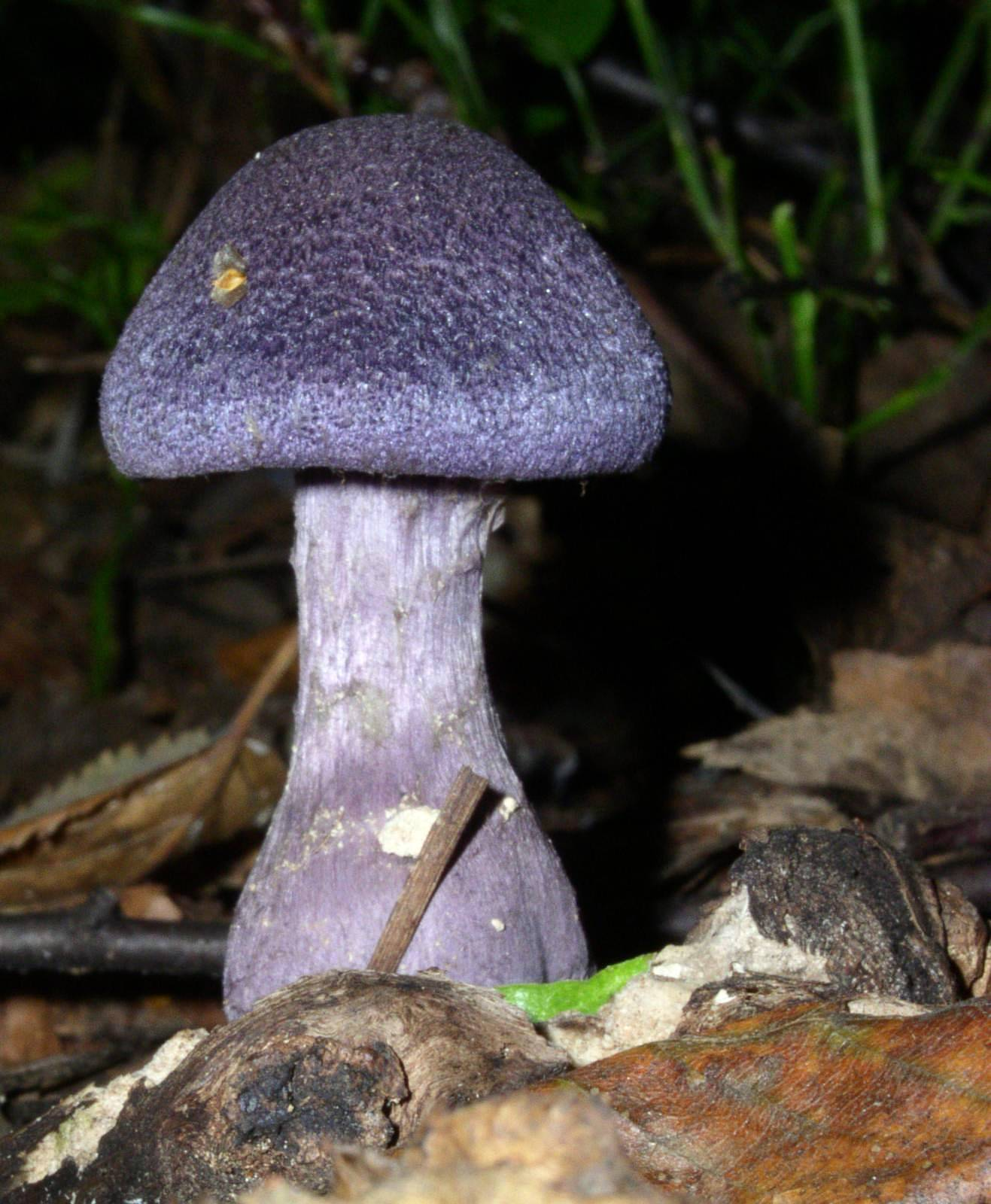
C. violaceus

Cortinarius is a globally distributed genus of fungus in the family Cortinariaceae. Its members are commonly known by the names cortinar and webcap. It is suspected to be the largest genus of agarics, containing over 2,700 widespread species.

Young specimens have a cortina (veil) between the cap and the stem, hence the name. Most of the fibres of the cortina are ephemeral and leave no more than limited remnants on the stem or cap edge. All species have a rusty brown spore print. Several species (such as C. orellanus) are highly toxic and many species are difficult to distinguish, making their consumption inadvisable.

== Taxonomy ==
Molecular studies of members of the genus Rozites, including its most famous member R. caperata, have shown them nested within Cortinarius and have been sunk into this genus. This genus was erected on the basis of a double veil, yet its members do not form a discrete lineage and lie nested within Cortinarius. Hence the genus is no longer recognised.

Some consider the subgenus Dermocybe to have generic status. Although it forms a single lineage, the consensus has been to sink it into the larger genus.

It is suspected to be the largest genus of agarics, containing over 2,700 widespread species.

In reference to the veil, the genus name means 'curtained' from Latin cōrtīna.

=== Selected species ===
- Cortinarius austrovenetus - also known as Dermocybe austroveneta or green skin-head is an Australian fungus typical of the brightly coloured Dermocybe subgenus.
- Cortinarius caperatus, the "gypsy mushroom", is an edible mushroom found in northern regions of Europe and North America.
- Cortinarius orellanus and C. rubellus are two of the deadly webcaps found in Europe and North America.

== Description ==
The veil protects the gills in younger specimens and usually disappears leaving little to no trace of itself as the mushroom grows. The spores are rusty brown to brownish-red in color.

It is usually possible to identify a mushroom as being a member of the genus, but extremely difficult to positively identify the species as many of the species are nearly identical. All mushrooms in this genus form mycorrhizae with a broad range of vascular-plant hosts.

== Toxicity ==
Several Cortinarius species are poisonous, mainly because they cause acute tubulointerstitial nephritis. Some are even lethal, such as C. rubellus and C. orellanus. Many Cortinarius varieties can be mistaken for other edible mushrooms (such as the blewit) and should therefore be researched before consumption.

The toxin in Cortinarius species, orellanine, is easy to detect because it is fluorescent. It has been found in at least 34 Cortinariaceae.

== Uses ==
Some species—notably the species C. praestans and C. caperatus—are edible and appreciated in North American and European cuisine.

Many mushrooms in the genus, for example C. sanguineus and other species in section Dermocybe, are colourful and are often used for dyeing.

== Infrageneric classification ==
The genus Cortinarius comprises several similar subgeneric classifications. The most distinctive of these are the subgenera Dermocybe, Leprocybe, Myxacium, Camphorati, and Cortinarius.

What follows is a list of several infrageneric classifications and the morphological differences between them.

Cortinarius subgenus Dermocybe: Characterized by agaricoid, stipitocarpic, small-medium sized basidiocarps with distinct yellow, olive, red, or orange colors. Stipe is dry. Pileus is dry and sometimes hygrophanous (although not always), felty to glutinous, fibrillose, and clavate to almost cylindrical in shape. Spores are subglobose to ellipsoid. Development is stipitocarpic.

Cortinarius subgenus Leprocybe: Characterized by agaricoid or sequestrate, small-medium sized basidiocarps (rarely large). Pileus is dry. Stipe is dry. Red, yellow, or olivaceous/green colors. Some parts of the basidiomata are fluorescent.

Cortinarius subgenus Camphorati: Characterized by agaricoid, stipitocarpic, medium-large sized basidiocarps. blue/purple, white to pale yellow colors. Pileus is dry. Stipe is dry. Pileipellis slightly duplex. Odour strong and often unpleasant (sometimes described as "cheesy"). Cheilocystidia present. Hypoderm not well developed.

Cortinarius subgenus Myxacium: Characterized by agaricoid or sequestrate, small-medium sized basidiocarps. White, brown, or purplish colors. Pileus is viscid to glutinous. Stipe is glutinous to dry and cylindrical in shape. Amygdaloid to citriform basidiospores measuring up to 20 micrometers (0.00079 in) in size.

Cortinarius subgenus Telamonia: Characterized by stipitocarpic, agaricoid, small-medium sized basidiocarps. Pileus is dry. Stipe is dry. Brown, white, grey, and/or purplish colors. Pileipellis is duplex. Varying degrees of hypodermic development.

Cortinarius subgenus Cortinarius: Characterized by stipitocarpic, agaricoid, medium-large sized basidiocarps. Pileus is dry, tomentose to scaly, and non-hygrophanous. Stipe is dry. KOH reaction red on any part of the basidiomata. Dark purple/violet to blackish in color. Pleurocystidia and cheilocystidia are both present. Pileipellis lacks a developed hypoderm.

Cortinarius subgenus Infracti: Characterized by stipitocarpic, agaricoid, medium-large sized basidiocarps. Pileus is viscid to glutinous, non-hygrophanous, fibrillose, hemispherical to broadly convex (bordering on plane), with a low and broad umbo. Lamellae crowded, adnate, adnexed to emarginate, and brown to grey in color (sometimes with faint purple hues). Odor on lamellae indistinct. Stipe cylindrical to clavate, white to olivaceous (grey or purple hues sometimes present), dry. Velum universale present, yellowish to brown (sometimes white when young), sparse, and fibrillose. Context in stipe is white to grey, hygrophanous, and marbled. Taste is bitter. NaOH reaction yellow to orange. Spores subglobose to broadly ellipsoid, measuring 7–9.5 by 5–7 micrometers (0.00028 in–0.00037 in × 0.00020 in–0.00028 in). Cystidia are not present. Pileipellis duplex with poorly developed hypoderm. Development type is stipitocarpic.

Cortinarius subgenus Illumini: Characterized by stipitocarpic, agaricoid, medium sized basidiocarps. Pileus is hygrophanous. Stipe is dry. Spores are subglobose. Pileipellis is duplex.

Cortinarius subgenus Iodolentes: Characterized by agaricoid to sequestrate, medium sized basidiocarps. Pileus is dry, hygrophanous, conical to hemispherical when young, low conical to low convex to plane with age, with an acute umbo, varying degrees of striations on cap margin, yellow-brown to red-brown to dark brown, context is brown. Lamallae medium to distantly spaced, adnate to adnexed to emarginate, yellow-brown to brown (usually with a white edge). Stipe dry, white when young to pale/yellow-brown with age, cylindrical, sometimes rooting, fibrillose, context usually a paler brown than in pileus. Velum universale present; white, usually sparse (sometimes forms girdles). Iodoform-like odor at stipe base. Spores measure 6.5–10.5 by 4.5–6.5 micrometers (0.00026 in–0.00041 in × 0.00018 in–0.00026 in), ovoid to amygdaloid to ellipsoid (ovoid to subglobose in C. fragrantior). Cheilocystidia present in some of the basidiomata; clavoid to balloon-shaped. Pileipellis is duplex. Hypoderm is well developed. Development type is stipitocarpic.

Cortinarius subgenus Orellani: Characterized by stipitocarpic, agaricoid, medium sized basidiocarps. Pileus is dry. Stipe is dry. Yellow to orange-brown to reddish in color. Pileipellis is duplex. Hypoderm is well developed.

Cortinarius subgenus Paramyxacium: Characterized by agaricoid to sequestrate, usually medium-large sized basidiocarps. Pileus is viscid/glutinous to dry, usually with scales present, sometimes wrinkly, fibrillose. Distinct annulus common in agaricoid species of this subgenus; sometimes forming thick scales in some species. Spores measure 8–16 by 5.5–9.5 micrometers (0.00031 in–0.00063 in × 0.00022 in–0.00037 in)–×– micrometers, ovoid, amygdaloid to citriform, sometimes ellipsoid to very short and broadly ellipsoid.
