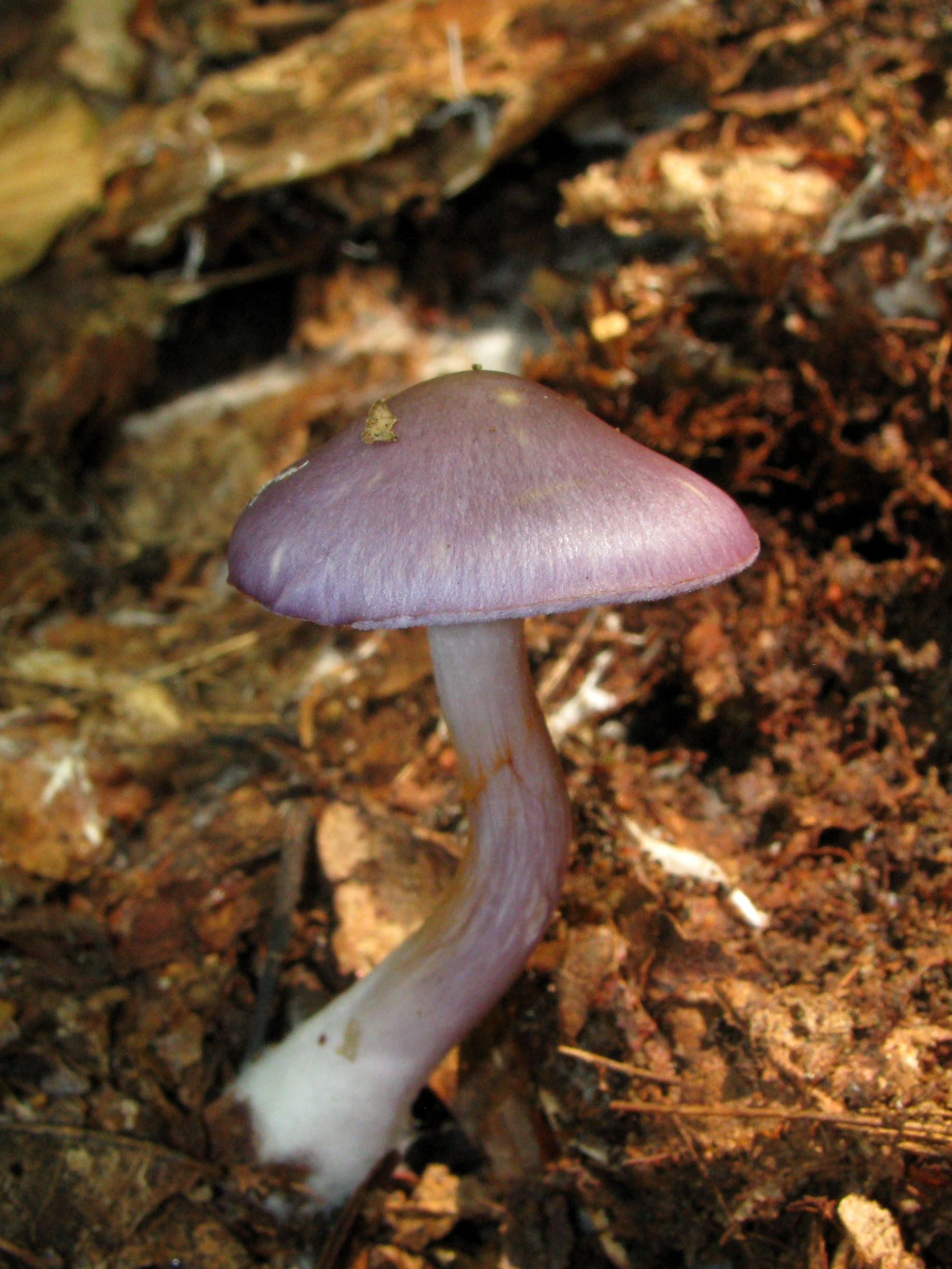

Scientific classification
- Kingdom: Fungi
- Division: Basidiomycota
- Class: Agaricomycetes
- Order: Agaricales
- Family: Cortinariaceae
- Genus: Cortinarius
- Species: C. iodes

Binomial name
- Cortinarius iodes Berk. & M.A.Curtis (1853)

= Cortinarius iodes =

Species of fungus

Cortinarius iodes
- Mycological characteristics
- Gills on hymenium
- Cap is convex
- Hymenium is adnate
- Stipe is bare
- Spore print is purple
- Ecology is mycorrhizal
- Edibility is unknown

Cortinarius iodes, commonly known as the spotted cort or the viscid violet cort, is a species of agaric fungus in the family Cortinariaceae. The fruit bodies have small, slimy caps which are up to 6 cm (2 1/4 in) in diameter and purple, developing yellowish spots and streaks in maturity. The gill color changes from violet to rusty or grayish brown as the inedible mushroom matures. There are several similar species, such as C. iodeoides, which can be distinguished by its bitter-tasting cap cuticle.

C. iodes grows on the ground in a mycorrhizal association with deciduous trees in the Americas and northern Asia.

== Taxonomy ==
The species was first described scientifically by Miles Joseph Berkeley and Moses Ashley Curtis in 1853. The type collection was made by American botanist Henry William Ravenel in South Carolina. Joseph Ammirati and Howard Bigelow considered Cortinarius heliotropicus, described by Charles Horton Peck 1914, to be the same species as C. iodes after examining the holotype specimens of both. According to the nomenclatural databases MycoBank and Index Fungorum, however, Cortinarius iodes does not have any synonyms. If they are indeed the same species, the name C. iodes has priority. C. iodes is classified in the subgenus Myxacium, along with other Cortinarius species that have a slimy cap and stem.

The specific epithet iodes means "violet-like". It is commonly known as the "spotted cort" or the "viscid violet cort".

== Description ==
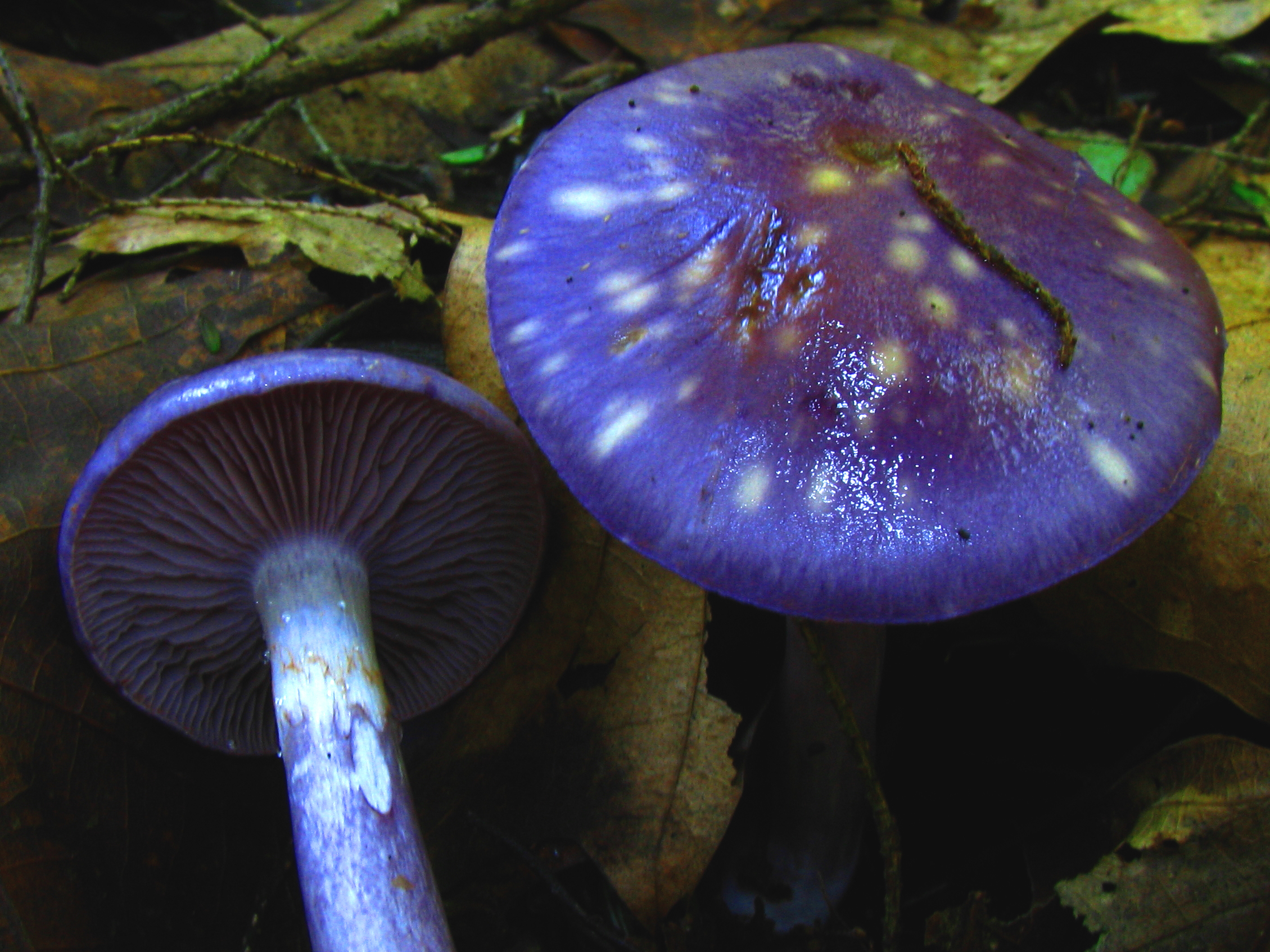
Mature caps develop characteristic yellowish spots. A wispy, rusty brown annular zone is visible on the upper stem.

The cap is initially bell-shaped before becoming broadly convex and then flat in maturity (sometimes retaining a broad umbo), and attains a diameter of 2–6 cm (3/4–2 1/4 in). The cap surface is slimy (in wet weather) and smooth, and has a lilac or purplish color. The flesh is white, firm, and thin. The color fades in maturity, and the cap develops irregular yellowish spots, or becomes yellowish in the center. Gills are attached to the stem and packed together closely. They are lilac to violet when young, but become rusty brown to grayish cinnamon when the spores mature. The stem measures 4–7 cm (1 1/2–2 3/4 in) long by 0.5–1.5 cm (1/4–1/2 in) thick, and is nearly equal in width throughout other than a somewhat bulbous base. It is solid (i.e., not hollow), slimy, smooth, and has violet or purplish colors that are usually lighter than the cap; sometimes, the stem base is more or less white. The cobweb-like, pale violet partial veil leaves a zone of thin, purple or rusty fibers on the upper stem. The mushroom has no distinctive taste or odor. The mushroom is not recommended for consumption.

Cortinarius iodes produces a rusty-brown spore print. The spores are elliptical, with a finely roughened surface, measuring 8–10 by 5–6.5 μm. The basidia (spore-bearing cells) are four-spored, club-shaped, and measure 28–39.5 by 9.3–14 μm. Both cheilocystidia and pleurocystidia are absent from the hymenium; the gill edge is populated by basidia and their undeveloped equivalents, basidioles. The cap cuticle comprises a distinctive layer of 3–8 μm-wide hyphae that form a layer usually 110–125 μm thick; this layer is less distinct or thinner in old or poorly preserved specimens. Clamp connections are present in hyphae throughout the fruit body.

=== Similar species ===
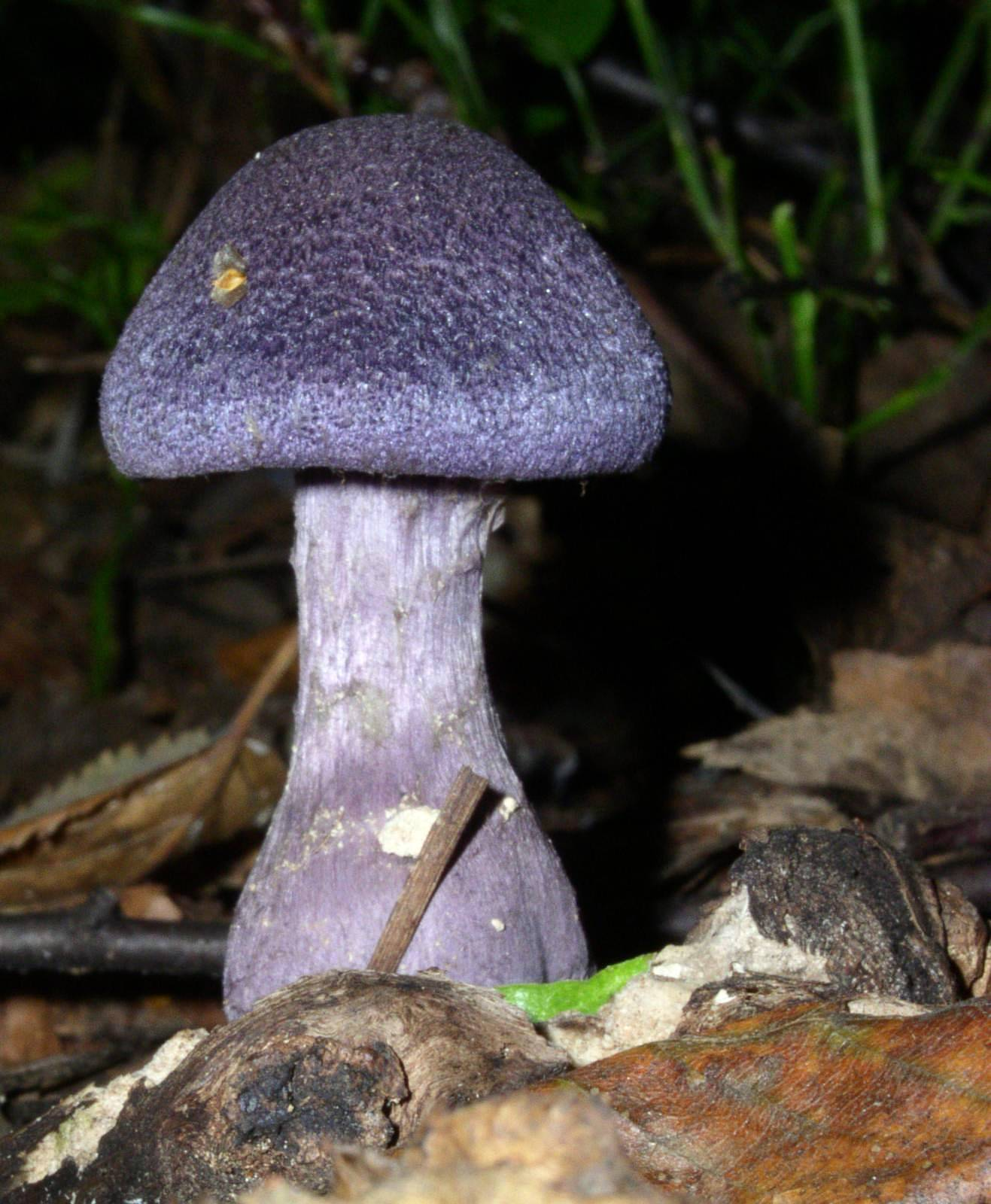
Cortinarius violaceus

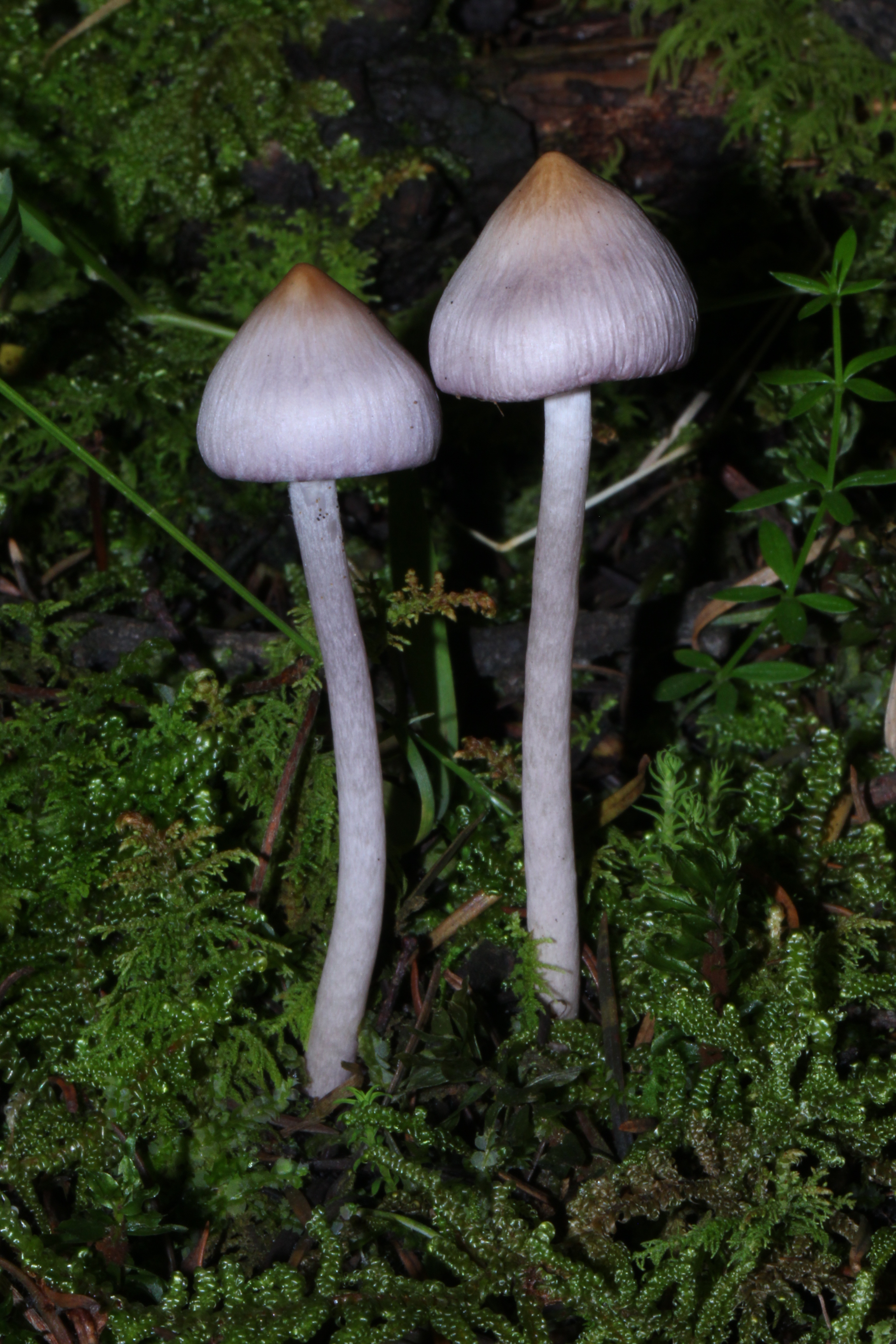
Inocybe lilacina

Cortinarius iodes is a fairly distinctive species and its combination of characteristics make it readily identifiable. Several other Cortinarius species have evolved a slimy coating that probably help protects the fruit bodies from predation by insects and other invertebrates. Other field techniques can be used to help identify dry fruit bodies that have lost their slime coat: by checking for leaf and twig debris adhering to the surface, or, by kissing the cap and stem to exploit the lips' enhanced sensitivity to stickiness. C. iodeoides is virtually identical in appearance to C. iodes, but can be distinguished from the latter by its bitter-tasting cap cuticle and smaller, narrower spores measuring 7.7–9.3 by 4.6–5.4 μm. The "violet cort" (C. violaceus) has a dry, scaly, dark purple cap and stem. The "pungent cort" (C. traganus) has a dry, light purple cap and stem and a bad odor. Two other widespread Cortinarius species with violet coloring and a slimy cap, C. salor and C. croceocaeruleus, can be distinguished from C. iodes by the absence of yellowish spotting. A North American species C. oregonensis has a paler lilac cap with a central region that is yellowish or brownish, and smaller spores that measure 7–8 by 4–5 μm. Inocybe lilacina has a dry, silky cap that features a prominent umbo.

== Habitat and distribution ==
Cortinarius iodes forms mycorrhizal associations with deciduous trees, particularly oaks. The fruit bodies of C. iodes sometimes grow singly, but more often scattered or in groups under hardwood trees, in humus and litterfall. Typical habitats include bog edges, swampy areas, and hummocks. Fruiting usually occurs from July to November. In North America, it is common in eastern regions, and rare in the Pacific Northwest. Its distribution extends from eastern Canada south into Central America and northern regions of South America. It also occurs in northern Asia. It has more recently been found in Serbia, Europe.

== See also ==
- List of Cortinarius species
