= Cortinarius jenolanensis =

Scientific classification
- Domain: Eukaryota
- Kingdom: Fungi
- Division: Basidiomycota
- Class: Agaricomycetes
- Order: Agaricales
- Family: Cortinariaceae
- Genus: Cortinarius
- Species: C. jenolanensis

Binomial name
- Cortinarius jenolanensis A.E.Wood (2009)

Species of fungus

Cortinarius jenolanensis is a fungus native to Australia. It was described in 2009 by Alec Wood, from a specimen collected at the Jenolan Caves on 30 April 1988. It has also been recorded from Tidbinbilla Nature Reserve in the Australian Capital Territory.

It is not closely related to the group of dark purple webcaps (subgenus Cortinarius) that contains Cortinarius kioloensis and Cortinarius violaceus.

The fruit body has a 4 cm (1 1/2 in) wide dark violet cap that is initially dome-shaped and becomes flattish as it matures. The cap surface is dry and smooth. The thin crowded wide dark purple gills are adnate to decurrent, and become more rusty brown as the spores mature. The stipe is 5–6 cm (2–2 1/4 in) high and 0.5–0.8 cm (1/4–1/4 in) wide. It is the same colour as the cap with a paler base. The remnants of the veil are sparse. The oval spores are 8.4 to 10.2 long by 5.7 to 6.9 μm wide. They have few warts, unlike those of C. kioloensis and relatives.

== See also ==
- List of Cortinarius species
