= Cortinarius subcalyptrosporus =

Scientific classification
- Domain: Eukaryota
- Kingdom: Fungi
- Division: Basidiomycota
- Class: Agaricomycetes
- Order: Agaricales
- Family: Cortinariaceae
- Genus: Cortinarius
- Species: C. subcalyptrosporus

Binomial name
- Cortinarius subcalyptrosporus Moser

Species of fungus

Cortinarius subcalyptrosporus is a fungus native to Borneo, where it was originally collected by E.J.H. Corner on the slopes of Mount Kinabalu in 1964 and described by Meinhard Michael Moser in 1986. Specimens from New Zealand classified as this species are Cortinarius kioloensis. It is poorly known.

The mushroom is wholly dark purple with slightly paler flesh, and closely resembles Cortinarius violaceus.

== See also ==
- List of Cortinarius species
