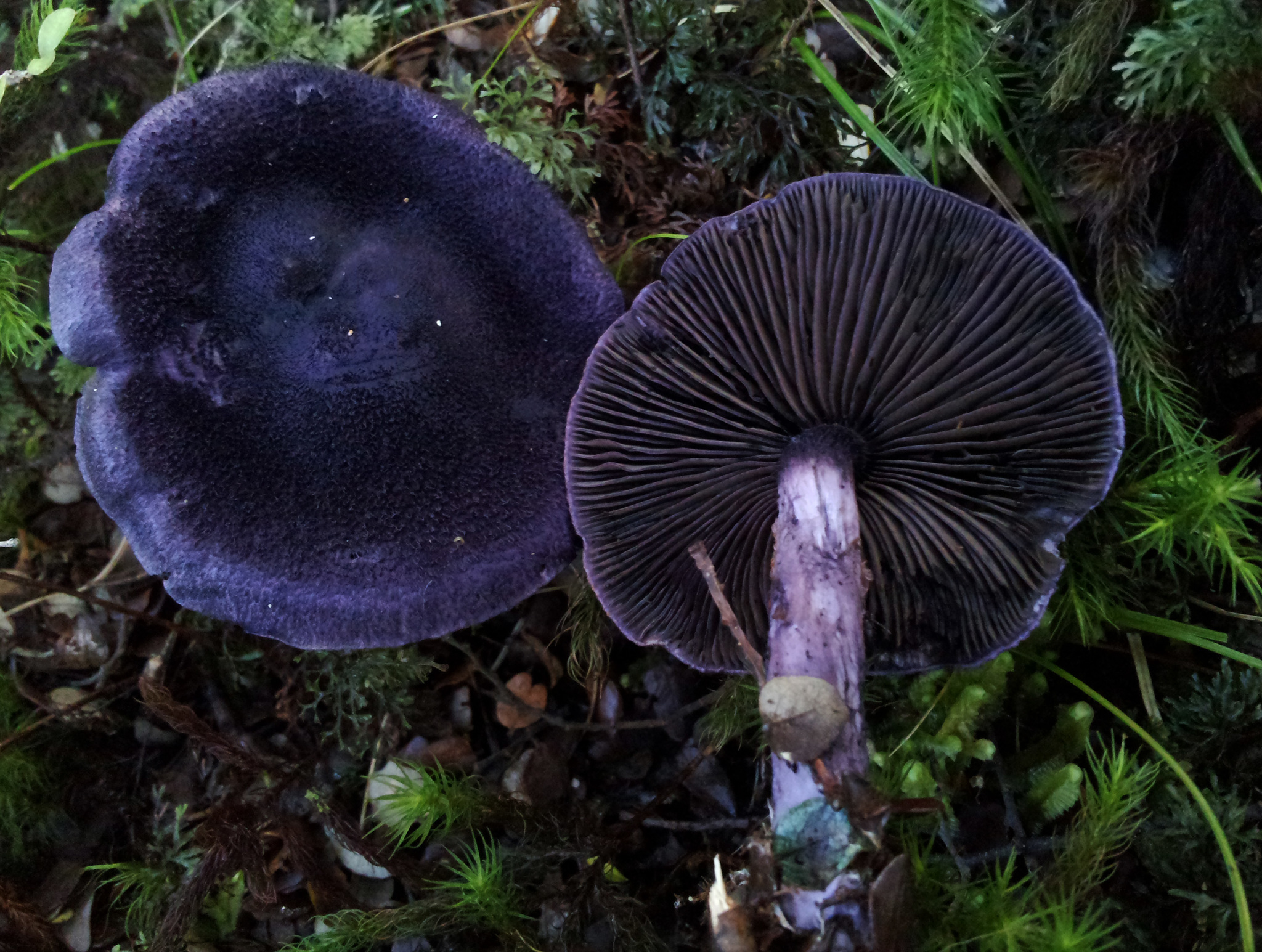

Scientific classification
- Kingdom: Fungi
- Division: Basidiomycota
- Class: Agaricomycetes
- Order: Agaricales
- Family: Cortinariaceae
- Genus: Cortinarius
- Species: C. atrolazulinus

Binomial name
- Cortinarius atrolazulinus Moser, 1986

= Cortinarius atrolazulinus =

Species of fungus

Cortinarius atrolazulinus is a fungus native to New Zealand.

It is not closely related to the group of dark purple webcaps (subgenus Cortinarius) that contains Cortinarius carneipallidus and Cortinarius violaceus.

The type specimen was found in Lake Rotoiti in 1969.

== See also ==
- List of Cortinarius species
