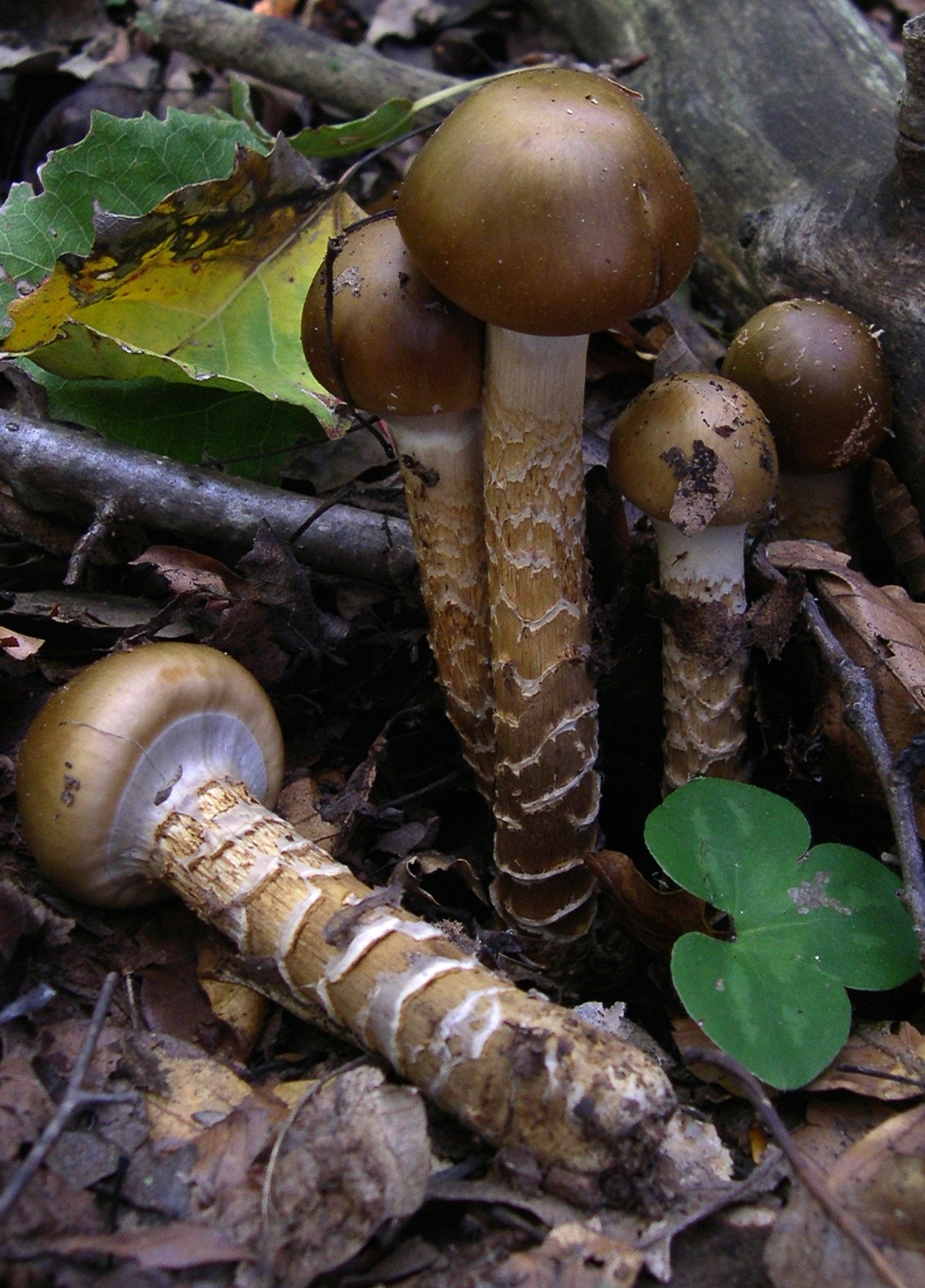

Scientific classification
- Kingdom: Fungi
- Division: Basidiomycota
- Class: Agaricomycetes
- Order: Agaricales
- Family: Cortinariaceae
- Genus: Cortinarius
- Species: C. trivialis

Binomial name
- Cortinarius trivialis J.E. Lange, 1940

= Cortinarius trivialis =

Species of fungus

Cortinarius trivialis Mycological characteristics
- Gills on hymenium
- Cap is convex or flat
- Hymenium is adnexed
- Stipe has a cortina
- Spore print is reddish-brown
- Ecology is mycorrhizal
- Edibility is poisonous

Cortinarius trivialis is a species of inedible fungus in the genus Cortinarius.

The mushroom cap is 3–12 cm (1.2–4.7 in) wide, grayish blue then yellow-brown, convex to flat, perhaps with a mild umbo. The gills are adnate or adnexed, grayish blue turning brown as the spores mature. The stalk is 5–15 cm (2–6 in) tall and 1–2 cm wide, equal or tapered, white to yellow, with whitish partial veil on the upper stalk (becoming brown with the spores).

It was reported as edible as recently as 1991, but European field guides consider it poisonous. For many species of Cortinarius edibility is unknown, but is not safe for experimentation as some species of Cortinarius are deadly poisonous. Similar species include and Cortinarius cliduchus and C. collinitus.
