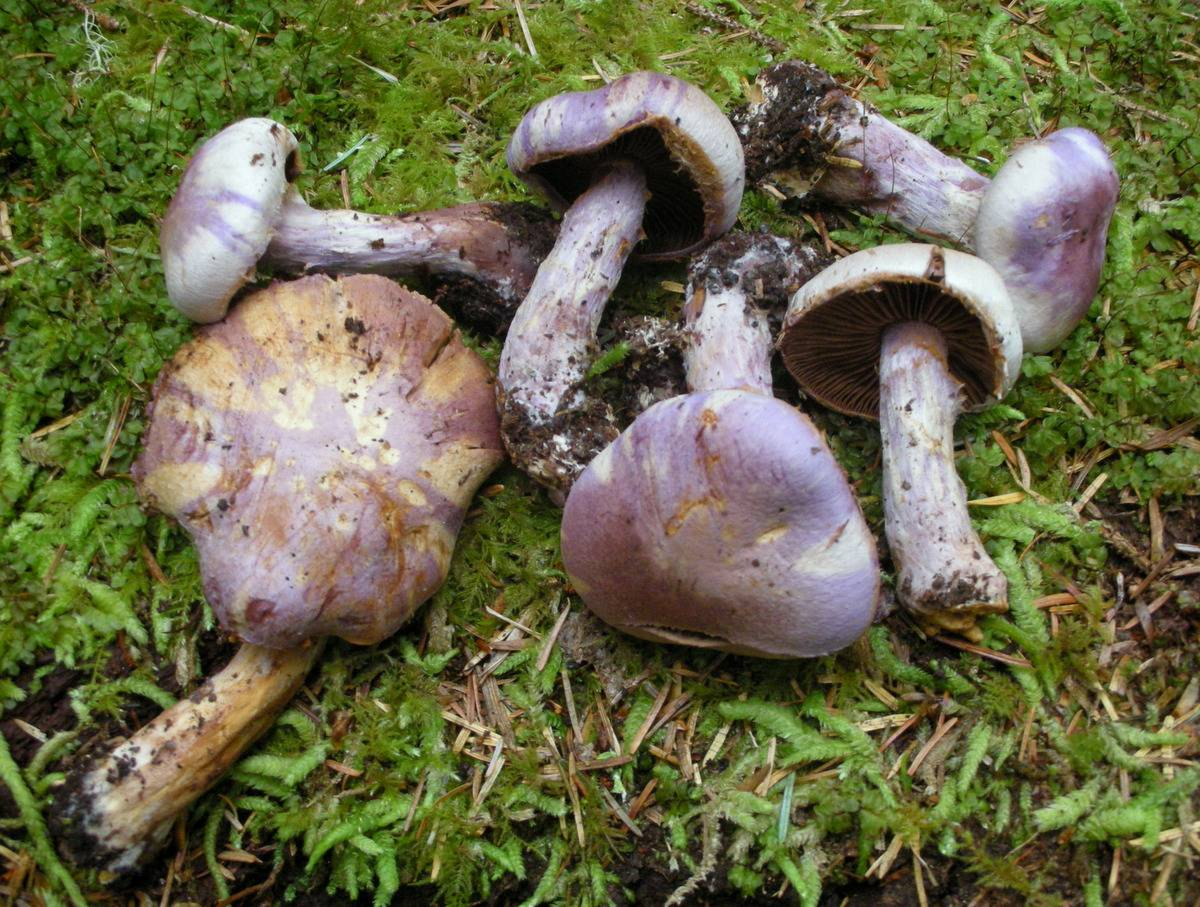

Scientific classification
- Kingdom: Fungi
- Division: Basidiomycota
- Class: Agaricomycetes
- Order: Agaricales
- Family: Cortinariaceae
- Genus: Cortinarius
- Species: C. traganus

Binomial name
- Cortinarius traganus Fr. (Fr.) (1838)

Synonyms
- Agaricus traganus Fr. (1818); Inoloma traganum (Fr.) Wünsche (1877); Phlegmacium traganum (Fr.) M.M.Moser (1953)

= Cortinarius traganus =

Species of fungus

Cortinarius traganus Mycological characteristics
- Gills on hymenium
- Cap is convex
- Hymenium is adnate
- Stipe is bare
- Ecology is mycorrhizal
- Edibility is inedible

Cortinarius traganus, also known as the gassy webcap, lilac conifer cortinarius, or lilac webcap, is a species of basidiomycete fungus in the genus Cortinarius. The mushroom is characterized by its lilac color, rusty-brown gills and spores, and rusty-brown flesh in the stem. It resembles a number of species, some of which are poisonous.

== Taxonomy ==
The species was originally named Agaricus traganus by Elias Magnus Fries in 1818. It is commonly known as the "gassy webcap" the "lilac conifer Cortinarius", or the "pungent Cort".

Fries' protologue (1818) was very brief, but it mentions the main characteristics of the species now considered to be C. traganus: fruity-smelling basidiomata, pileus pale lilac, stipe purplish-white and bulbous, flesh yellow. Fries also referred to an illustration by Schaefer (1774), which then became the lectotype of the species. But the illustration of C. traganus was mixed, with most of the figures fitting the concept of C. traganus, but with some illustrations indicating characteristics of other species. Therefore, Liimatainen and colleagues designated a collection by Lindström from September 13, 1988, from a dry, sandy pine forest in Myran, Sweden, as the epitype due to the ambiguity of the material.

Some authorities consider the American variant to be a distinct species, Cortinarius pyriodorus, reserving the name C. traganus for the European version.

== Description ==
The cap is 4–13 centimetres (1 1/2–5 in) in diameter, initially spherical to convex, with the margin rolled inward, then flattened, sometimes with large, broad, central umbo. The margin often cracks star-like, particularly in dry weather. The mushroom is a pale azure violet to pale lilac color, soon bleaching and fading to tan brown or rusty brown. The cap is dry, silkily shiny or tomentose at the margin with membranaceous bronze fragments of the veil, the white fragments of which often adhere to the surface like scabs. Later the surface becomes cracked into small scales. The gills are sub-crowded, quite thick, broadly adnate, and often slightly emarginate (notched). They are 7–15 mm (1/4–5/8 in) broad, slightly dirty violet when young but usually brown, with only faintly violet tint, later brown, dusted saffron ochre, and with lighter crenulate edge. The stem is 5–12 cm (2–4 3/4 in) long and 1–4 cm (3/8–1 5/8 in) thick, tough and thick, bulbously at the base, and spongily stuffed inside. It is vivid violet for a long time in the upper part above the cortina, paler below, and covered with a tough, whitish, boot-like veil, which usually leaves upright zones on the stem. The cortina is violet. The flesh is saffron yellowish-brown to yellowish-brown from the beginning except at the tip of the stem where it is dirty violaceous, or, unpleasantly, goats, so much so that it may induce vomiting in more sensitive individuals. It has a strong, bitter taste, particularly when young. It has a somewhat fruity smell.

The basidia (the spore-bearing cells) are 30–35 by 6.5–7.5 μm. The spore deposit is rusty brown. The spores are ellipsoid, covered with fine warts or dots, and measure 8–9 by 5–5.5 μm.

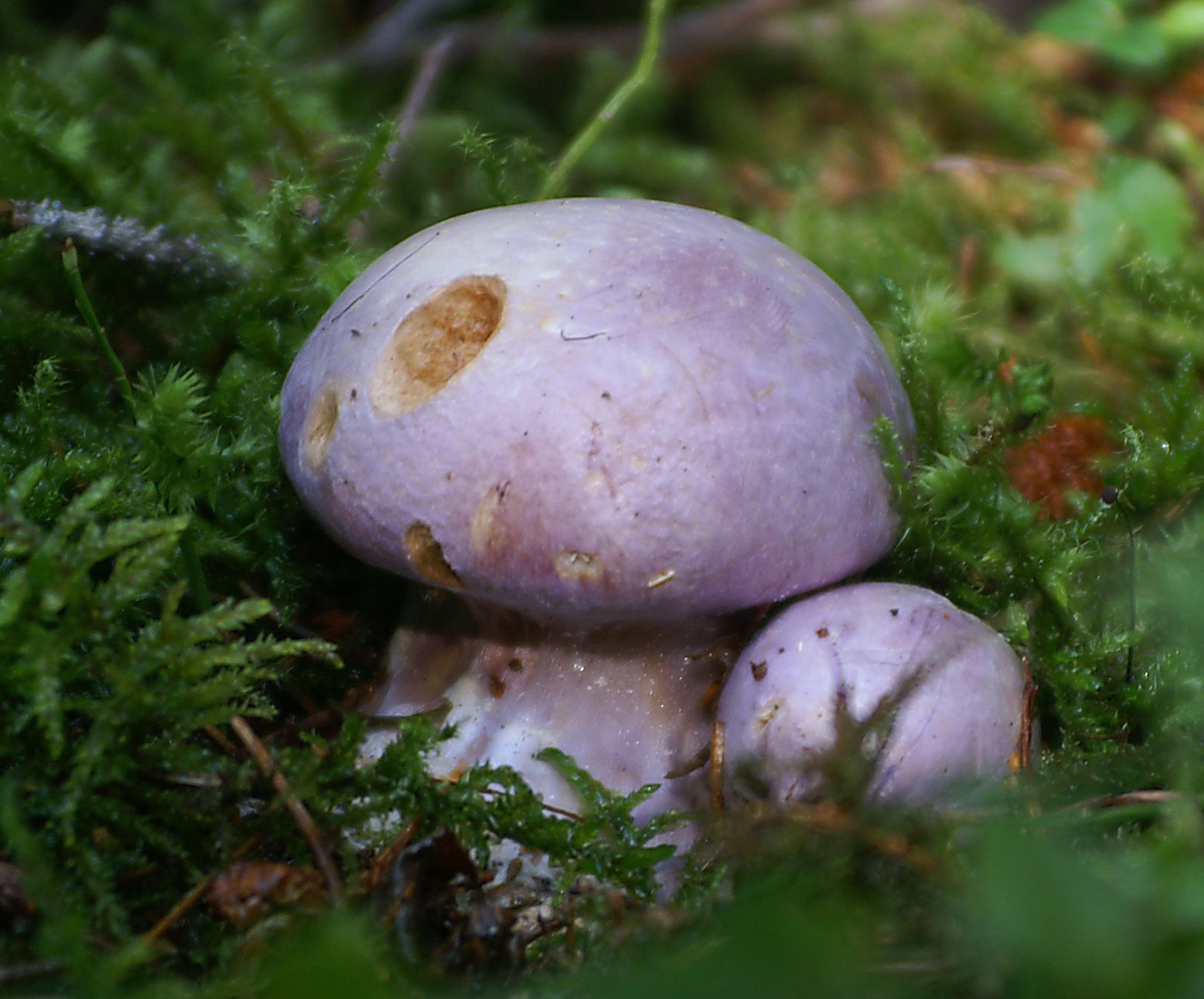
Young specimens

=== Similar species ===
There are numerous lavender-hued species in the genus, including the pale C. alboviolaceus and the rare C. odoritraganus.

Cortinarius camphoratus is violet but has pale violet gills which soon turn rusty, and a longer stem with paling flesh at the base. Its spores are also longer, warty, and measure 8.5–11 by 5–6 μm. It has a pungent smell similar to rotting potatoes. C. muricinus has a cap which is either permanently violet or becoming rust-colored from the disc outward. The gills are initially blue, dirty cinnamon when old, and the stem violet lilac, with lighter fragments of the veil later turning rust-colored. Its spores measure 13–15 by 7–8 μm.

=== Edibility ===
The mushroom has been variously reported as "mildly poisonous", or indigestible. It should not be consumed due to its similarity to deadly poisonous species.

== Distribution and habitat ==
Cortinarius traganus is found in coniferous forests worldwide. It seems to prefer poorer soils, both siliceous and non-calcareous. It is widespread throughout the temperate zone of the Northern Hemisphere. It is fairly common in North America, generally appearing from August to September, or somewhat later on the West Coast.

== See also ==
- List of Cortinarius species
