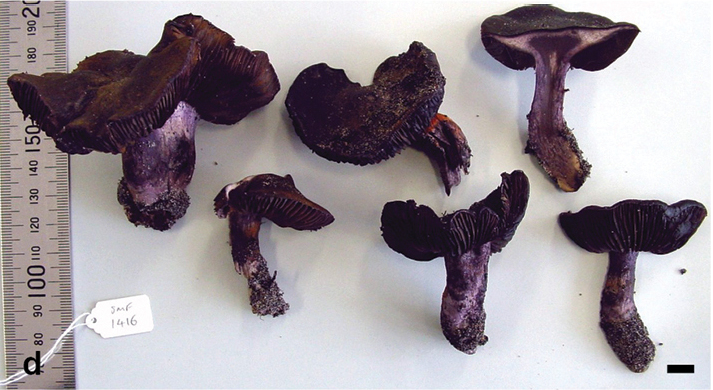

Scientific classification
- Domain: Eukaryota
- Kingdom: Fungi
- Division: Basidiomycota
- Class: Agaricomycetes
- Order: Agaricales
- Family: Cortinariaceae
- Genus: Cortinarius
- Species: C. hallowellensis

Binomial name
- Cortinarius hallowellensis A.E. Wood (2009)

= Cortinarius hallowellensis =

Species of fungus

Cortinarius hallowellensis is a fungus native to Western Australia and Tasmania. It was described in 2009 by Alec Wood, and is related to the northern hemisphere species Cortinarius violaceus. The main species in the North America group, Cortinarius monticola, has also been identified, but has not been found in Australia. Despite this relative isolation, there is genetic interchange between the North American species and the Australian species.

== See also ==
- List of Cortinarius species
