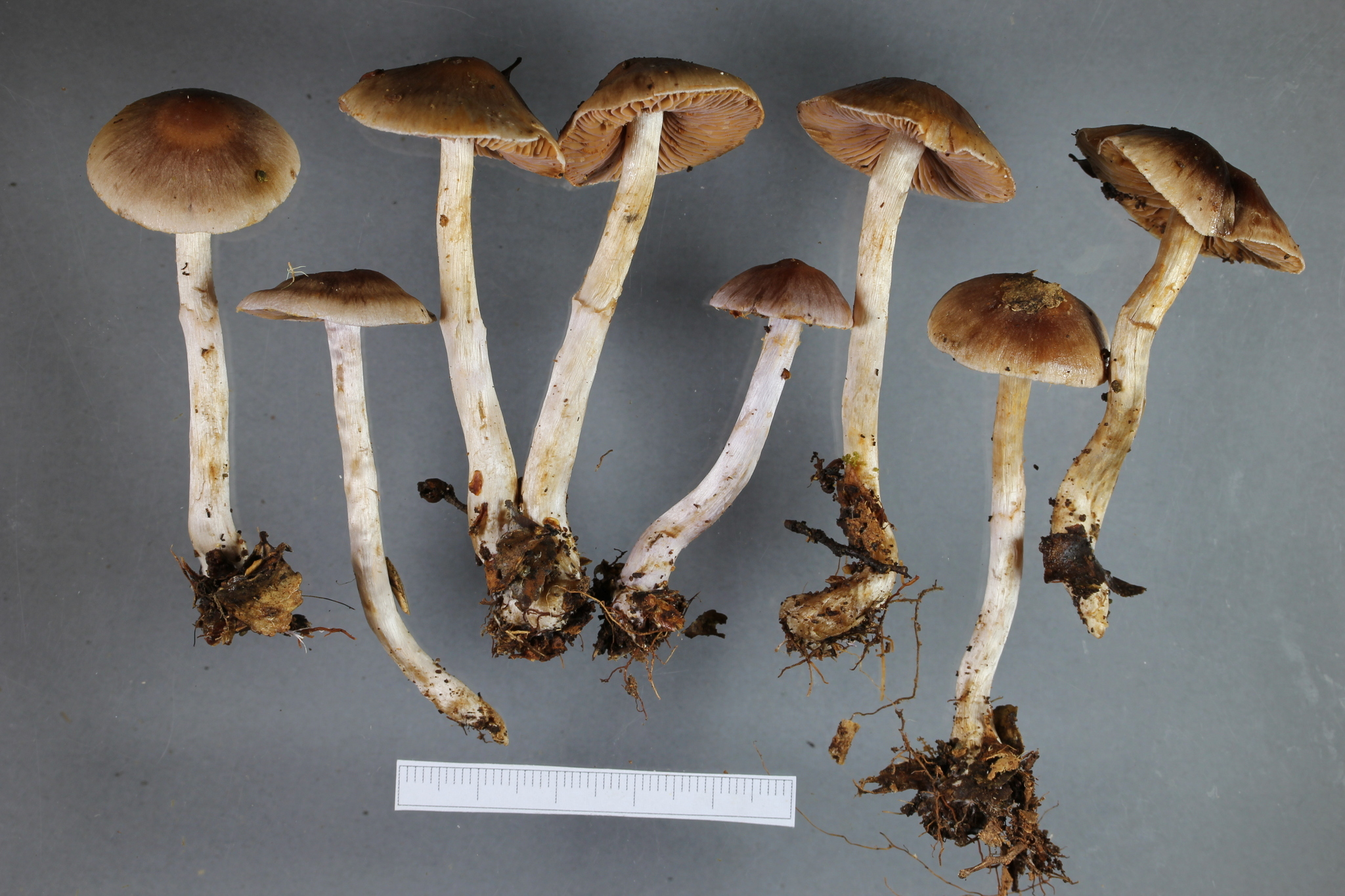

Scientific classification
- Domain: Eukaryota
- Kingdom: Fungi
- Division: Basidiomycota
- Class: Agaricomycetes
- Order: Agaricales
- Family: Cortinariaceae
- Genus: Cortinarius
- Species: C. dysodes

Binomial name
- Cortinarius dysodes Soop

= Cortinarius dysodes =

Species of fungus

Cortinarius dysodes is a species of agaricoid fungus in the genus Cortinarius. It is endemic to Aotearoa New Zealand.

== Taxonomy ==
The species was described in 2001 by mycologist Karl Soop. The holotype specimen (PDD70499) was collected by Soop in Craigieburn, Canterbury, New Zealand in April 1999.

== Description ==
This species produces agaricoid fruit bodies that are often clumped (fasciculate). The pileus is up to 60 mm in diameter, dry, hygrophanous, brown with a purple tinge and yellowing with age, and a conspicuous white rim. The lamellae are violet to reddish lilac. The stipe ranges from cylindrical to slightly club-shaped, white (appearing dirty white towards the base) and with whitish bands. The veil and cortina are described as sparse and white with a violet tinge. The flesh is pale grey-brown, and when young has a violet tinge, often becoming marbled violaceous with age. A distinctive feature of this species is that the odour is very strong and unpleasant, according to Soop to be more or less "gas-like (cooking-gas or acetylene) or of rotting vegetables; taste similar". Tissues of the fruit bodies have no notable reactions with sodium hydroxide.

Cortinarius dysodes is in Cortinarius section Camphorati along with C. tasmacamphoratus, C. camphoratus and C. putorius, a relationship supported by ITS/LSU phylogenetic analysis.

== Habitat and distribution ==
Cortinarius dysodes occurs in forests and is found in both the North and South Island of New Zealand. It is an ectomycorrhizal fungus, associated with Nothofagus species.

== Etymology ==
The specific epithet dysodes derives from the Greek dysodes meaning pestilential. This refers to the disgusting smell of the fruit bodies, even when young and fresh.

== See also ==
- List of Cortinarius species
