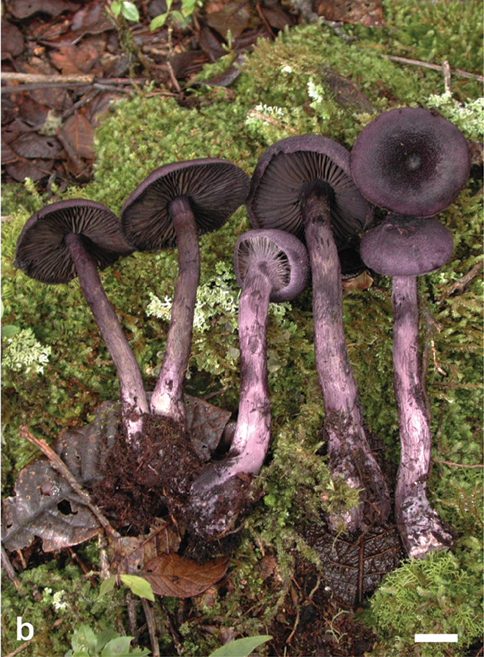

Scientific classification
- Domain: Eukaryota
- Kingdom: Fungi
- Division: Basidiomycota
- Class: Agaricomycetes
- Order: Agaricales
- Family: Cortinariaceae
- Genus: Cortinarius
- Species: C. palatinus

Binomial name
- Cortinarius palatinus Harrower (2015)

= Cortinarius palatinus =

Species of fungus

Cortinarius palatinus is a fungus native to Costa Rica. It was described in 2015 by Emma Harrower and colleagues, and is closely related to the northern hemisphere species Cortinarius violaceus.

== See also ==
- List of Cortinarius species
