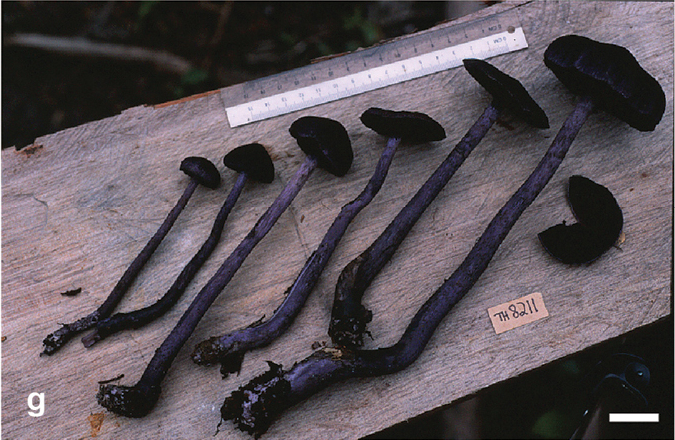

Scientific classification
- Domain: Eukaryota
- Kingdom: Fungi
- Division: Basidiomycota
- Class: Agaricomycetes
- Order: Agaricales
- Family: Cortinariaceae
- Genus: Cortinarius
- Species: C. altissimus

Binomial name
- Cortinarius altissimus Harrower & T.W. Henkel (2015)

= Cortinarius altissimus =

Species of fungus

Cortinarius altissimus is a fungus native to Guyana. It was described in 2015 by Emma Harrower and colleagues, and is closely related to the northern hemisphere species Cortinarius violaceus.

== See also ==
- List of Cortinarius species
