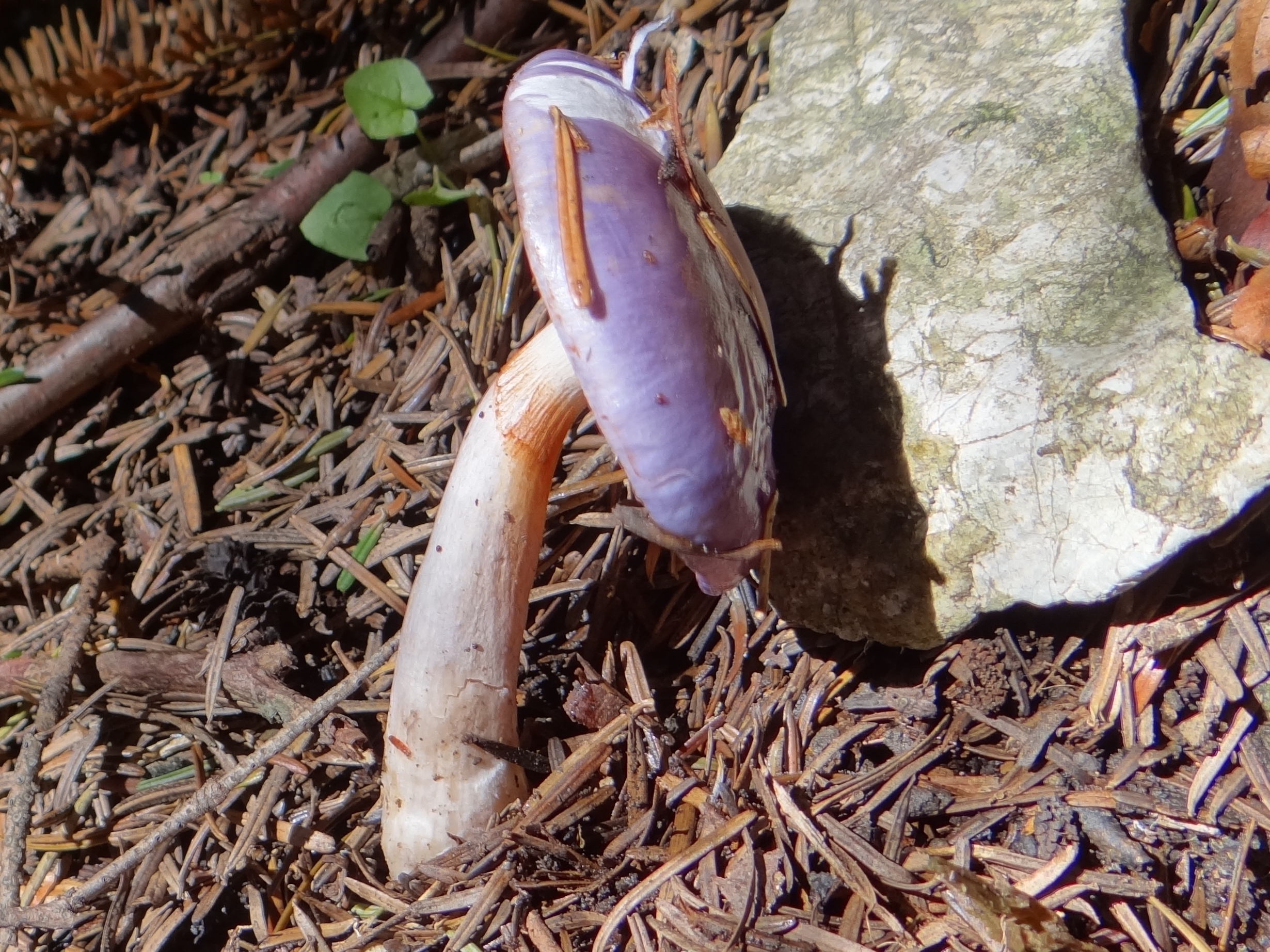

Scientific classification
- Kingdom: Fungi
- Division: Basidiomycota
- Class: Agaricomycetes
- Order: Agaricales
- Family: Cortinariaceae
- Genus: Cortinarius
- Subgenus: Cortinarius subg. Myxacium
- Species: C. salor

Binomial name
- Cortinarius salor Fr. 1838

= Cortinarius salor =

Species of fungus

Cortinarius salor is a basidiomycete fungus of the genus Cortinarius native to Europe and Asia, spreading as far east as Japan and New Guinea. It is also found in conifer forests of the North American Pacific Northwest.

The mushroom is blue-lilac when young, fading to yellow or tan with age. Similar species include C. anomalus and C. muscigenus.

== See also ==
- List of Cortinarius species
