= Inocybe lilacina =

Scientific classification
- Kingdom: Fungi
- Division: Basidiomycota
- Class: Agaricomycetes
- Order: Agaricales
- Family: Inocybaceae
- Genus: Inocybe
- Species: I. lilacina

Binomial name
- Inocybe lilacina (Peck) Kauffman (1918)

Synonyms
- Agaricus geophyllus var. lilacinus Peck (1873); Inocybe geophylla var. lilacina (Peck) Gillet (1878)

Species of fungus

Inocybe lilacina is an agaric (gilled fungus) in the family Inocybaceae. Basidiocarps (fruit bodies) have silky, lilac to purplish pilei and stipes (caps and stems). The species has a predominantly eastern North American distribution.

== Taxonomy ==
The species was originally described in 1873 as Agaricus geophyllus var. lilacinus by American mycologist Charles Horton Peck, who collected it in Bethlehem, New York. It was raised to the level of species by Calvin Henry Kauffman in 1918, though some mycologists continued to regard it as no more than a variety or colour form of the white-capped Inocybe geophylla.

Recent molecular research, based on cladistic analysis of DNA sequences, has confirmed that I. lilacina is a species quite separate from I. geophylla. Moreover, I. lilacina is part of a species complex comprising six or more similar taxa with lilac or purplish caps.

== Distribution and habitat ==
Inocybe lilacina is widely distributed in eastern North America where it forms an ectomycorrhizal association with both broadleaf trees and conifers. Based on a sequence from an Estonian soil sample, it may also occur in northern Europe.

== Similar species ==
Inocybe pallidicremea, formerly referred to I. lilacina. is a widespread and common conifer associate in northern North America. Other North American look-alikes include I. sublilacina, and I. ionocephala. Additional lilac-capped species occur in Europe and Australia.
