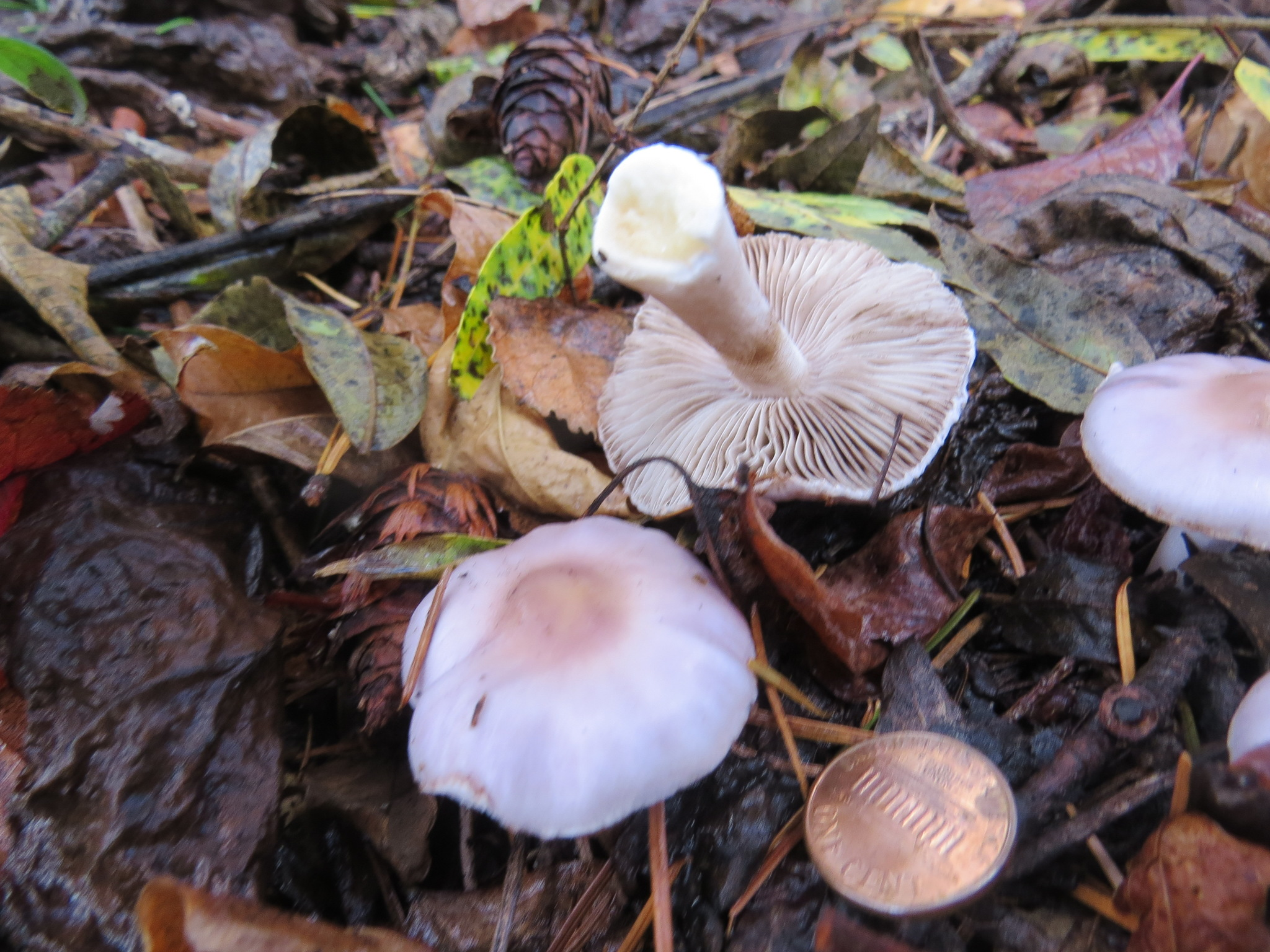

Scientific classification
- Kingdom: Fungi
- Division: Basidiomycota
- Class: Agaricomycetes
- Order: Agaricales
- Family: Inocybaceae
- Genus: Inocybe
- Species: I. pallidicremea

Binomial name
- Inocybe pallidicremea Grund & D.E. Stuntz

= Inocybe pallidicremea =

Species of fungus

Inocybe pallidicremea Mycological characteristics
- Gills on hymenium
- Cap is conical or umbonate
- Hymenium is adnate or sinuate
- Stipe has a cortina
- Spore print is brown
- Ecology is mycorrhizal
- Edibility is poisonous

Inocybe pallidicremea, commonly known as the lilac fiberhead, is a species of mushroom in the family Inocybaceae.

== Taxonomy ==
Inocybe pallidicremea was long classified as I. geophylla var. lilacina or I. lilacina, but studies have revealed this species to be distinct. Inocybe lilacina is found in eastern North America, unlike I. pallidicremea, which is found in western North America.

== Description ==
The lilac-colored cap is 10-4 centimeters in diameter. It can be smooth or silky fibrillose. It starts out conical, becoming convex or umbonate. The stipe is 2-6 centimeters long and 0.3-0.6 centimeters wide. Inocybe pallidicremea has a cortina, which sometimes leaves a ring zone around the stipe. The gills can be adnate or sinuate, and start out gray. The gills become brown as the mushroom matures. The spore print is brown.

== Habitat and ecology ==
Inocybe pallidicremea is a mycorrhizal fungus that forms a symbiotic relationship with conifer trees. It fruits from late summer until early winter.
