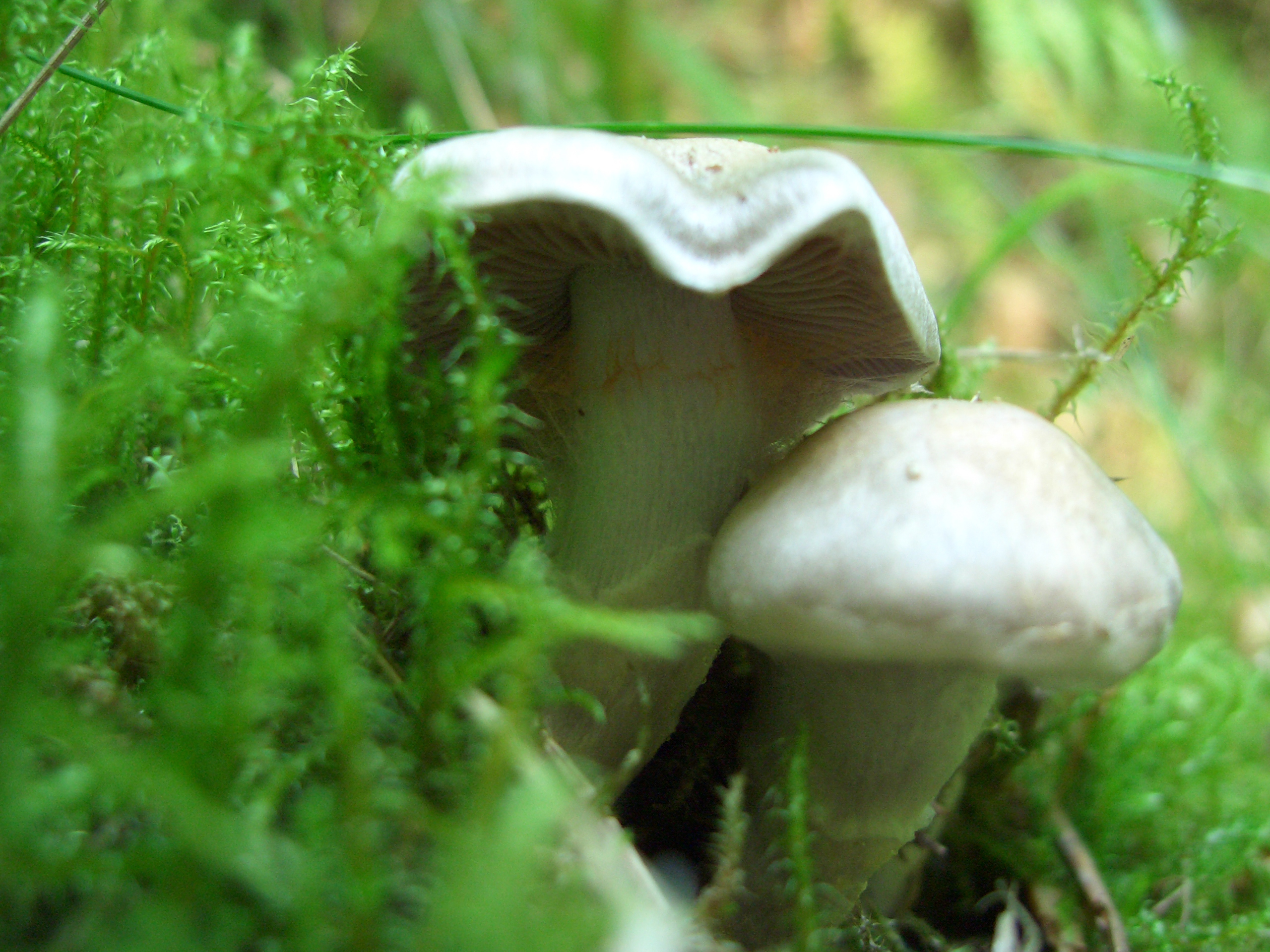

Scientific classification
- Kingdom: Fungi
- Division: Basidiomycota
- Class: Agaricomycetes
- Order: Agaricales
- Family: Cortinariaceae
- Genus: Cortinarius
- Species: C. alboviolaceus

Binomial name
- Cortinarius alboviolaceus (Pers.) Fr. (1838)

Synonyms
- Agaricus glaucopus Pers. (1801); Inoloma alboviolaceum (Pers.) Wünsche (1877)

= Cortinarius alboviolaceus =

Species of fungus

Cortinarius alboviolaceus, commonly known as the silvery-violet webcap, is a basidiomycete mushroom of the genus Cortinarius native to Europe and North America.

== Description ==
The mushroom is lilac, later yellowing and often becoming whitish/grayish. Its cap is 3–8 cm wide, conical to umbonate, dry, silky, with whitish to pale lilac flesh. The gills are adnate or adnexed, grayish lilac becoming brown as the spores mature and lend their color. The stalk is 4–8 cm tall and .5–1.5 wide, larger at the base, sometimes with white veil tissue. The odour and taste are indistinct.

=== Similar species ===
Similar species include the essentially identical C. griseoviolaceus, as well as Inocybe lilacina. C. camphoratus is similar, but with a foul odour. C. malachius has a grayish cap and, when dry, a scaly surface.

== Potential edibility ==
Its edibility is considered unknown by some guides but it is not recommended due to its similarity to deadly poisonous species. At least one guide considers it edible, but not recommended. Conflicting accounts indicate that it may itself be poisonous.
