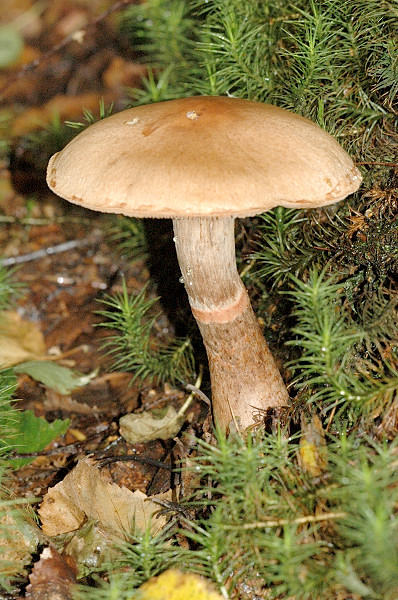

Scientific classification
- Domain: Eukaryota
- Kingdom: Fungi
- Division: Basidiomycota
- Class: Agaricomycetes
- Order: Agaricales
- Family: Cortinariaceae
- Genus: Cortinarius
- Species: C. caninus

Binomial name
- Cortinarius caninus Fr., 1821

= Cortinarius caninus =

Species of fungus

Cortinarius caninus is a basidiomycota mushroom in the family of Cortinariaceae.

== General ==
The Cortinarius are a superior mushroom, due to their cortina (a type of very fine veil). This is the most prolific genus of fungus, and numbers in the thousands.

== Description ==
Cortinarius caninus has a creamy brown cap measuring up to 9 cm in diameter. The foot is fibrous and bulbous and measures from 5–11 cm in height, with a diameter of 0.8 to 1.4 cm. It sprouts in autumn in forests, especially conifer.

The species is inedible.

== Gallery ==
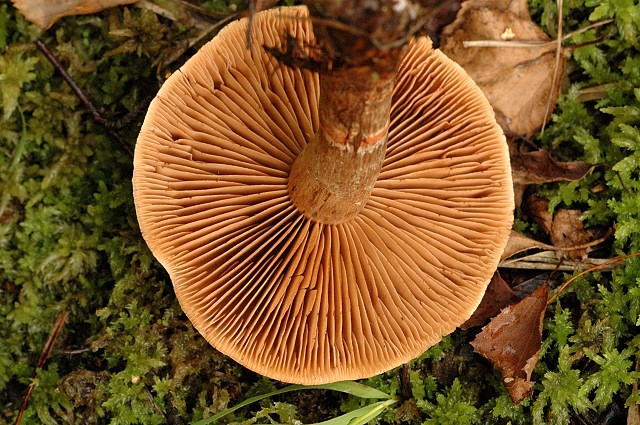

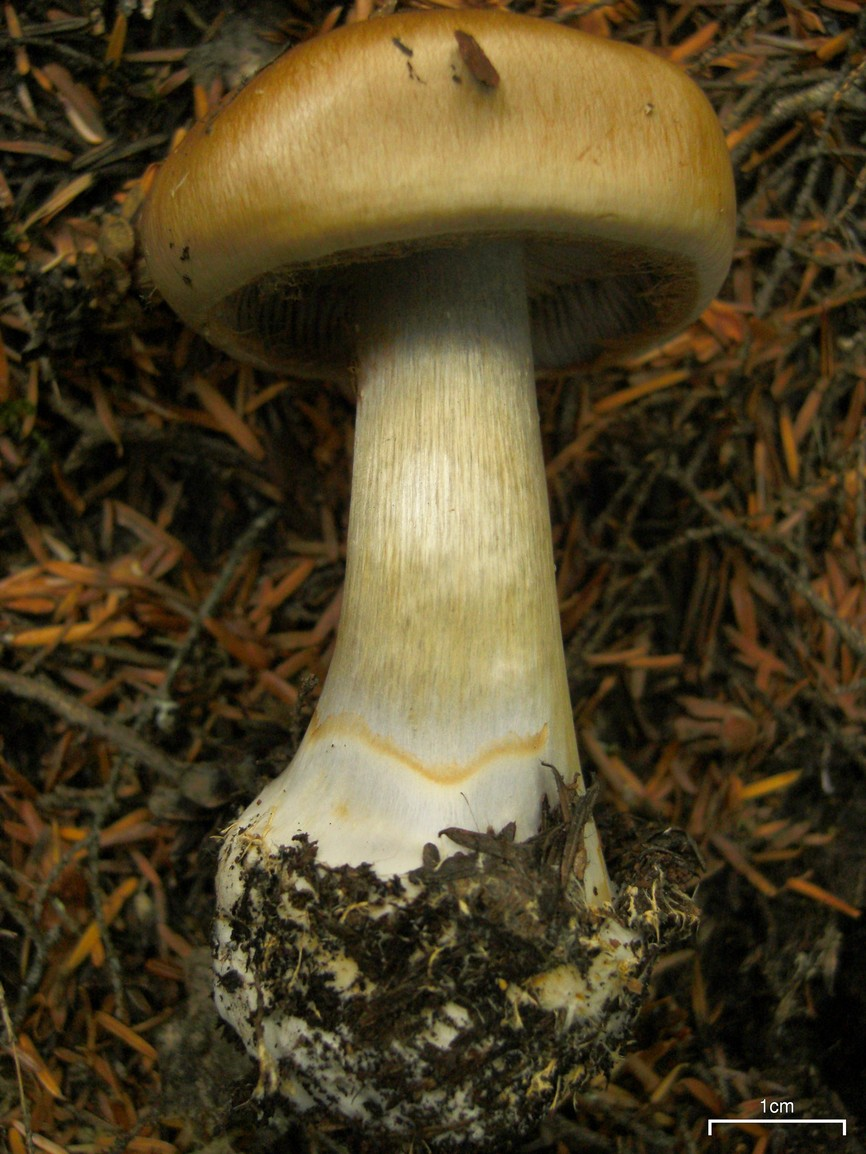
