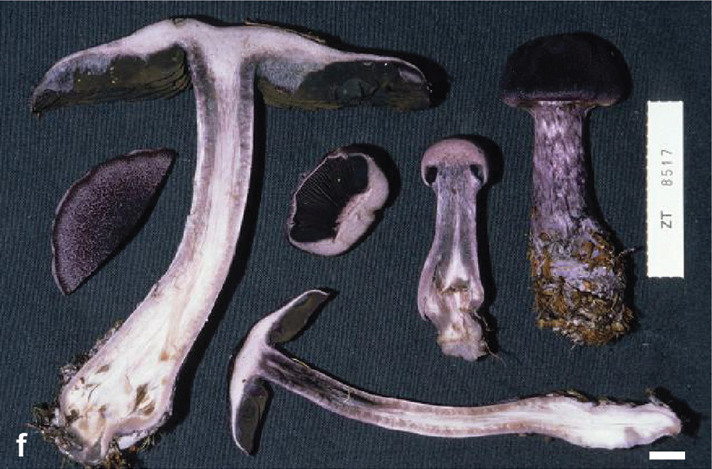

Scientific classification
- Domain: Eukaryota
- Kingdom: Fungi
- Division: Basidiomycota
- Class: Agaricomycetes
- Order: Agaricales
- Family: Cortinariaceae
- Genus: Cortinarius
- Species: C. carneipallidus

Binomial name
- Cortinarius carneipallidus Harrower & E. Horak (2015)

= Cortinarius carneipallidus =

Species of fungus

Cortinarius carneipallidus is a fungus native to New Zealand. It was described in 2015 by Emma Harrower and Egon Horak, and is related to the northern hemisphere species Cortinarius violaceus.

== See also ==
- List of Cortinarius species
