= Cortinarius atroviolaceus =

Scientific classification
- Domain: Eukaryota
- Kingdom: Fungi
- Division: Basidiomycota
- Class: Agaricomycetes
- Order: Agaricales
- Family: Cortinariaceae
- Genus: Cortinarius
- Species: C. atroviolaceus

Binomial name
- Cortinarius atroviolaceus Moser

Species of fungus

Cortinarius atroviolaceus is a fungus native to Borneo, where it was originally collected by E.J.H. Corner on the slopes of Mount Kinabalu in 1964 and described by Meinhard Michael Moser in 1986. Specimens from New Zealand classified as this species are probably a different species. It is poorly known.

The mushroom is wholly dark purple with slightly paler flesh, and resembles Cortinarius violaceus though is smaller.

== See also ==
- List of Cortinarius species
