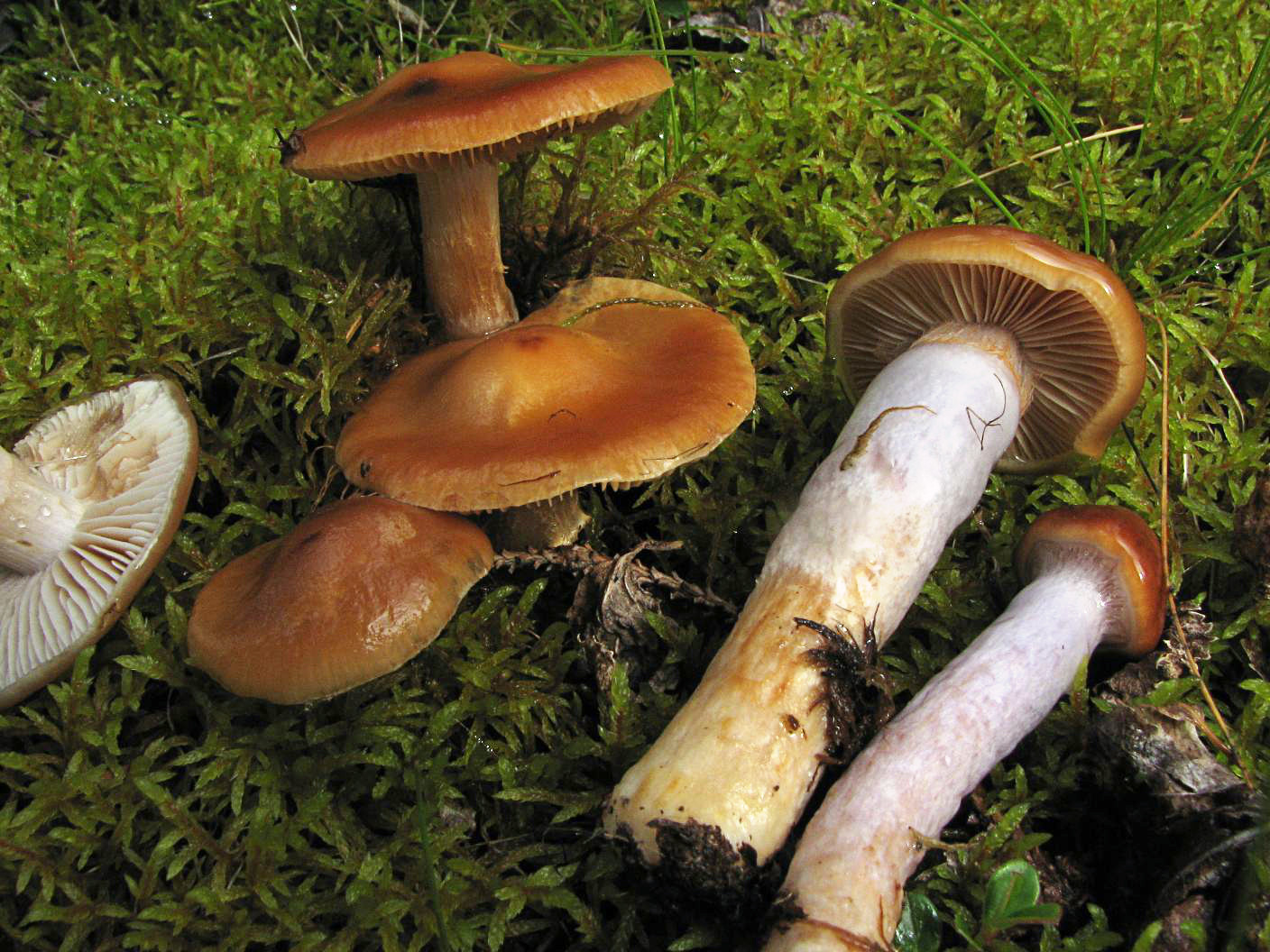

Scientific classification
- Domain: Eukaryota
- Kingdom: Fungi
- Division: Basidiomycota
- Class: Agaricomycetes
- Order: Agaricales
- Family: Cortinariaceae
- Genus: Cortinarius
- Species: C. collinitus

Binomial name
- Cortinarius collinitus (Pers.) Fr. (1838)

= Cortinarius collinitus =

Species of fungus

Cortinarius collinitus Mycological characteristics
- Gills on hymenium
- Cap is convex or flat
- Hymenium is adnexed
- Stipe has a cortina
- Spore print is reddish-brown
- Ecology is mycorrhizal
- Edibility is inedible

Cortinarius collinitus, commonly known as the belted slimy cortinarius, is a species of fungus in the family Cortinariaceae.

== Description ==
The cap is 3–10 centimetres (1 1/4–4 in) in diameter, convex to flat in shape, with a sticky, gelatinous surface (in moist conditions). The gills are adnexed, close, and pallid or pale violet in color. The stipe is typically 5–15 cm long, 0.5–2 cm thick, solid and equal. It has transverse scaly-looking bands. The spore print is rusty-brown, like that of most Cortiniarius species.

The species is considered inedible, partly due to the complex of related species not yet having been tested.

== Habitat and distribution ==
It grows singly or in groups with hardwoods and conifers.

== See also ==
- List of Cortinarius species
