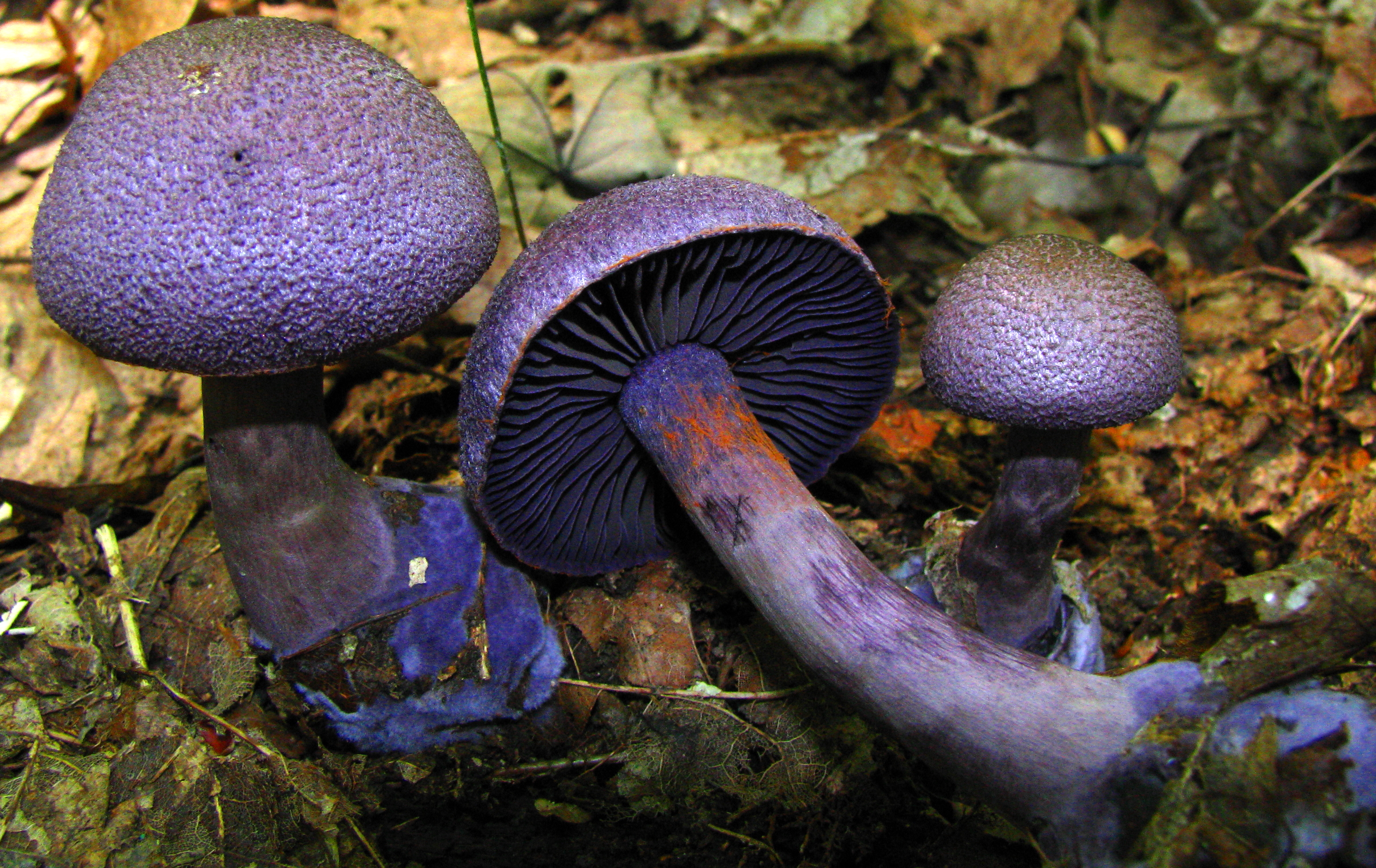

Scientific classification
- Kingdom: Fungi
- Division: Basidiomycota
- Class: Agaricomycetes
- Order: Agaricales
- Family: Cortinariaceae
- Genus: Cortinarius
- Subgenus: Cortinarius subg. Cortinarius
- Species: C. violaceus

Binomial name
- Cortinarius violaceus (L.) Gray (1821)

Synonyms
- List: Agaricus violaceus L. (1753); Amanita araneosa var. violaceus (L.) Lam. (1783); Inoloma violaceum (L.) Wünsche (1877); Gomphos violaceus (L.) Kuntze (1898)

= Cortinarius violaceus =

Species of fungus native to the Northern Hemisphere

Cortinarius violaceus
- Mycological characteristics
- Gills on hymenium
- Cap is convex
- Hymenium is adnate
- Stipe is bare
- Spore print is reddish-brown
- Ecology is mycorrhizal
- Edibility is not recommended

Cortinarius violaceus, commonly known as the violet webcap or violet cort, is a fungus in the webcap genus, Cortinarius, for which it serves as the type species. It was first described by Carl Linnaeus in 1753 and has undergone several name changes. It is readily distinguished from other species in the genus by its dark colouration and distinct cystidia. There are some populations that seem to prefer deciduous trees and others that prefer pines, but no genetic divergence between the two has been found. When identified as taxonomically separate from the deciduous-preferring populations, the pine-preferring populations have been referred to either as a separate species, C. hercynicus, or as a subspecies, C. violaceus ssp. hercynicus. Other populations once identified as C. violaceus or close to that species have now been described as new and separate species, such as C. palatinus, C. neotropicus, C. altissimus, C. kioloensis and C. hallowellensis.

The fruit bodies are dark purple mushrooms with caps up to 15 cm (6 in) across, sporting gills underneath. The stalk measures 6 to 12 centimetres (2 1/3 to 4 2/3 in) by 1 to 2 cm (3/8 to 3/4 in), sometimes with a thicker base. The dark flesh has a smell reminiscent of cedar wood. Forming symbiotic (ectomycorrhizal) relationships with the roots of various plant species, C. violaceus is found predominantly in conifer forests in North America and deciduous forests in Europe. It is sometimes described as edible, but resembles some toxic species.

== Taxonomy ==
Agaricus violaceus was one of the few fungal species named by Carl Linnaeus in his 1753 work Species Plantarum. The specific epithet violaceus refers to the deep violet colour of its cap. In English, it is commonly known as the violet webcap, or violet cort. French naturalist Jean-Baptiste Lamarck viewed it as a variety (violaceus) of a variable species he described as Amanita araneosa in 1783, and Christiaan Hendrik Persoon placed it in the Section Cortinaria of Agaricus in his 1801 work Synopsis Methodica Fungorum. Cortinarius was established as a genus by English botanist Samuel Frederick Gray in the first volume of his 1821 work A Natural Arrangement of British Plants, where the species was recorded as Cortinaria violacea, "the violet curtain-stool".

The starting date of fungal taxonomy had been set as 1 January 1821, to coincide with the date of the works of the "father of mycology", the Swedish naturalist Elias Magnus Fries, which meant the name Cortinarius violaceus required sanction by Fries (indicated in the name by a colon) to be considered valid. Thus, the species was written as Cortinarius violaceus (L.: Fr.) Gray. However, a 1987 revision of the International Code of Botanical Nomenclature set the starting date at 1 May 1753, the date of publication of Linnaeus's Species Plantarum. Hence, the name no longer requires the ratification of Fries's authority, and is thus written as Cortinarius violaceus (L.) Gray.

German botanist Friedrich Otto Wünsche described the species as Inoloma violaceum in 1877. In 1891, his countryman Otto Kuntze published Revisio Generum Plantarum, his response to what he perceived as poor methodology in existing nomenclatural practice. He called the violet webcap Gomphos violaceus in 1898. However, Kuntze's revisionary programme was not accepted by the majority of biologists.

Cortinarius violaceus was designated as the type species for the genus Cortinarius by Frederic Clements and Cornelius Lott Shear in their 1931 work The Genera of Fungi. Mycologist David Arora considers this odd, due to the mushroom's unusual colour and cystidia. Because of this designation, if C. violaceus were to be split from the rest of the current genus, then, according to the rules of the International Code of Botanical Nomenclature, it would retain the name Cortinarius, while the other species would have to be reclassified. The species was one of only two placed in the Cortinarius subgenus Cortinarius by the Austrian mycologist Meinhard Moser. Molecular investigation of webcaps worldwide has increased this number to at least twelve.

A 2015 genetic study by evolutionary biologist Emma Harrower and colleagues of C. violaceus and its closest relatives suggests that the group (section Cortinarius) originated in Australasia and began diverging from a common ancestor around twelve million years ago in the Miocene, with C. violaceus itself diverging from its closest relative around 3.9 million years ago. The fact that these species diverged relatively recently indicates that some form of dispersal must have taken place across large bodies of water. The original plant hosts were flowering plants (angiosperms), and C. violaceus—or its direct ancestor—developed a symbiotic relationship with pines, as well as multiple flowering plants; this may have facilitated its expansion across the Northern Hemisphere.

Some mycologists classify C. violaceus as two distinct species—Cortinarius violaceus and Cortinarius hercynicus, with hercynicus relating to the Hercynian Forest region of southern Germany. These species are differentiated morphologically by the latter population's rounder spores. Persoon had described C. hercynicus as a separate species in 1794, though Fries regarded it as conspecific with C. violaceus. Moser separated them once again as species in 1967, and Norwegian biologist Tor Erik Brandrud classified C. hercynicus as a subspecies of C. violaceus in 1983. However, Harrower and colleagues, on limited molecular testing, found no genetic or ecological difference between the two taxa.

Some fungal populations around the world that have been classified as C. violaceus have been found to belong to separate lineages and hence reclassified as new species within section Cortinarius. Two separate lineages discovered in populations from Costa Rica have been renamed Cortinarius palatinus and C. neotropicus, one from Guyana—described as sp. aff. violaceus—has become C. altissimus, and another from Western Australia and Tasmania described as both C. violaceus and sp. aff. violaceus has become C. hallowellensis. Yet another from Eastern Australia has been named C. kioloensis. The poorly known species Cortinarius subcalyptrosporus and Cortinarius atroviolaceus from Borneo are almost indistinguishable from C. violaceus outside of hard-to-observe spore detail—the former has smaller spores with a detached perisporium (outer layer) and the latter has smaller spores and fruiting bodies. Another population, known from Borneo, New Guinea and New Zealand, was ascribed to C. violaceus by Moser. It was noted as very similar to the original species concept of C. violaceus, and awaits description as a new species after a phylogenetic study revealed it to represent a distinct taxon.

== Description ==
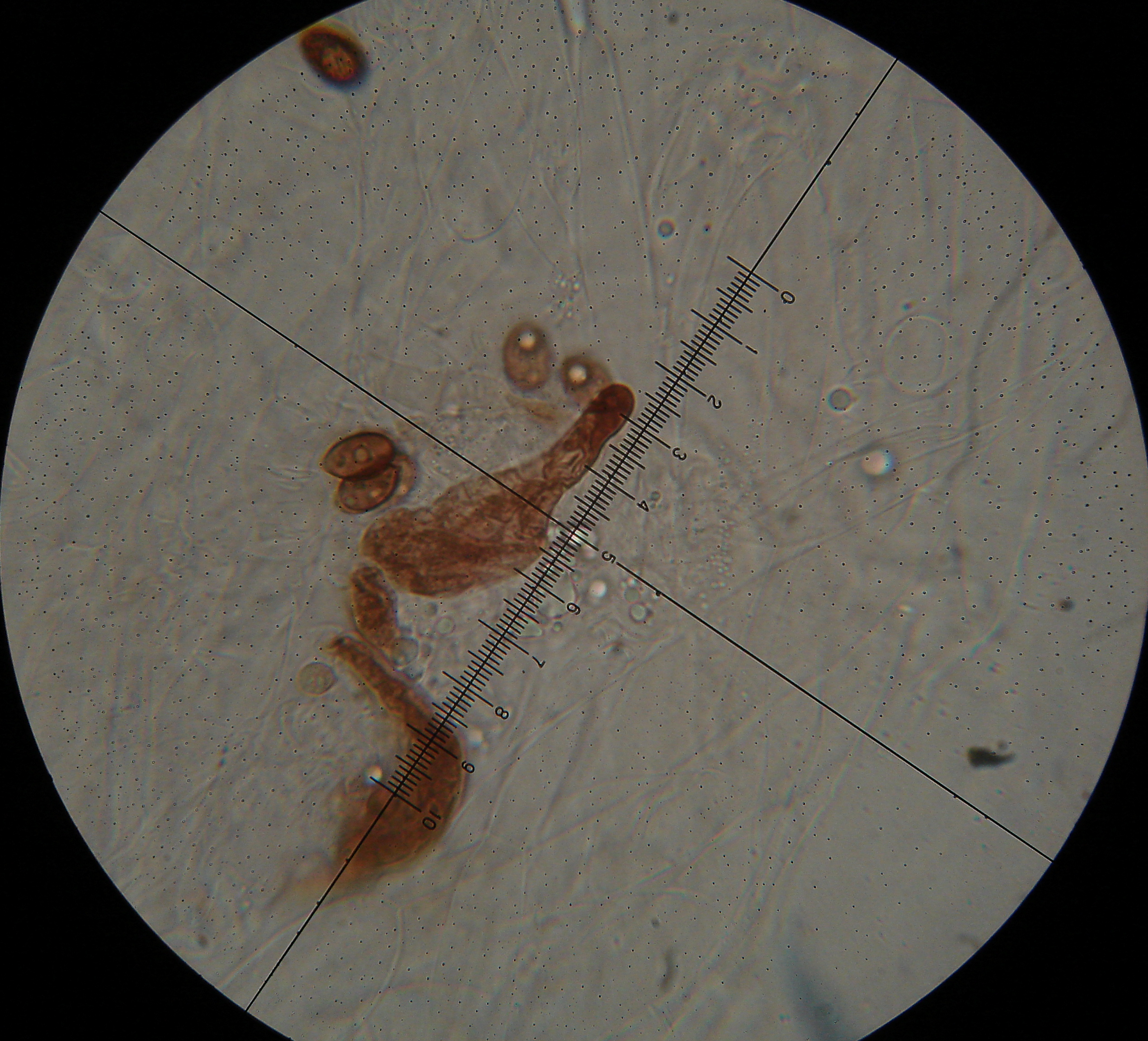
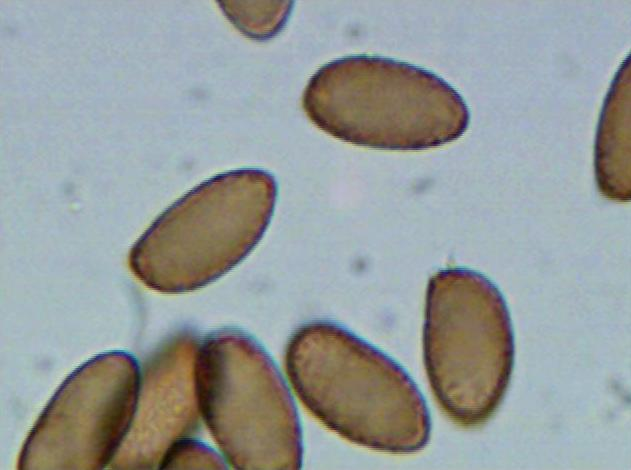
Cortinarius violaceus cheilocystidia and spores stained in KOH (top) and spores (bottom)

Cortinarius violaceus has a convex (becoming broadly convex, umbonate or flat) cap of 3.5–15 centimetres (1 3/8–6 in) in diameter with an incurved margin. It is dark violet to blue-black in colour, and is covered in fine, downy scales. This layer on the cap is known as the pileipellis, which is either classified as a trichoderm—parallel hyphae running perpendicular to the surface and forming a layer 6–22 μm wide—or rarely an ixocutis, a layer of gelatinized hyphae 2–11 μm wide. The cap surface, unlike that of many other Cortinarius species, is neither sticky nor slimy, though it is occasionally greasy. The stipe, or stalk, is 6 to 18 cm (2 1/3 to 7 in) tall, and 1 to 2 cm (3/8 to 3/4 in) thick. Due to its swollen, bulbous nature, the base of the stipe can sometimes be as wide as 4 cm (1 1/2 in). The stipe is a similar colour to the cap, and covered in wool-like fibrils; purple mycelium can be present at the base. Younger specimens feature a veil, but this vanishes quickly. The flesh is violet, but darker below the pileipellis and in the stipe. The flesh has a mild taste, indistinctly reminiscent of cedar wood, with a slight, pleasant smell, also reminiscent of cedar wood. The gills are dark violet, changing to a purplish-brown with age. They have an adnate connection to the stipe, and can be very dark in older specimens. The mushroom stains red when in contact with potassium hydroxide (KOH). Fruit bodies identified as C. v. hercynicus are less robust than those of the nominate subspecies.

The spore print is rust-coloured, while the spores themselves measure 12 to 15 μm by 7 to 8.5 μm. They are rough, from elliptical to almond-shaped, and covered in medium-sized warts. The spores are wider in C. v. hercynicus. The species is the only one in the genus to have cystidia on both the faces and the edges of the gills. A large number of cystidia are present, and, individually, they measure between 60 and 100 μm by between 12 and 25 μm. They are flask-shaped, with somewhat purple contents.

=== Similar species ===
Although there are many Cortinarius species with some degree of violet colour, C. violaceus and its close relatives are easily distinguished by their much darker purple colour. Cortinarius iodes of the southeastern United States has a slimy purple cap and paler violet stipe. The other species in the section Cortinarius are dark purple and superficially similar, but can be differentiated based on host and geography as they do not occur in the same locations as C. violaceus. Certain Leptonia species in northwestern North America, including L. carnea and L. nigroviolacea, have a similar color, but are easily differentiated due to their pink spore print.

C. cotoneus, Entoloma bloxamii, and E. parvum are also similar.

== Distribution and habitat ==
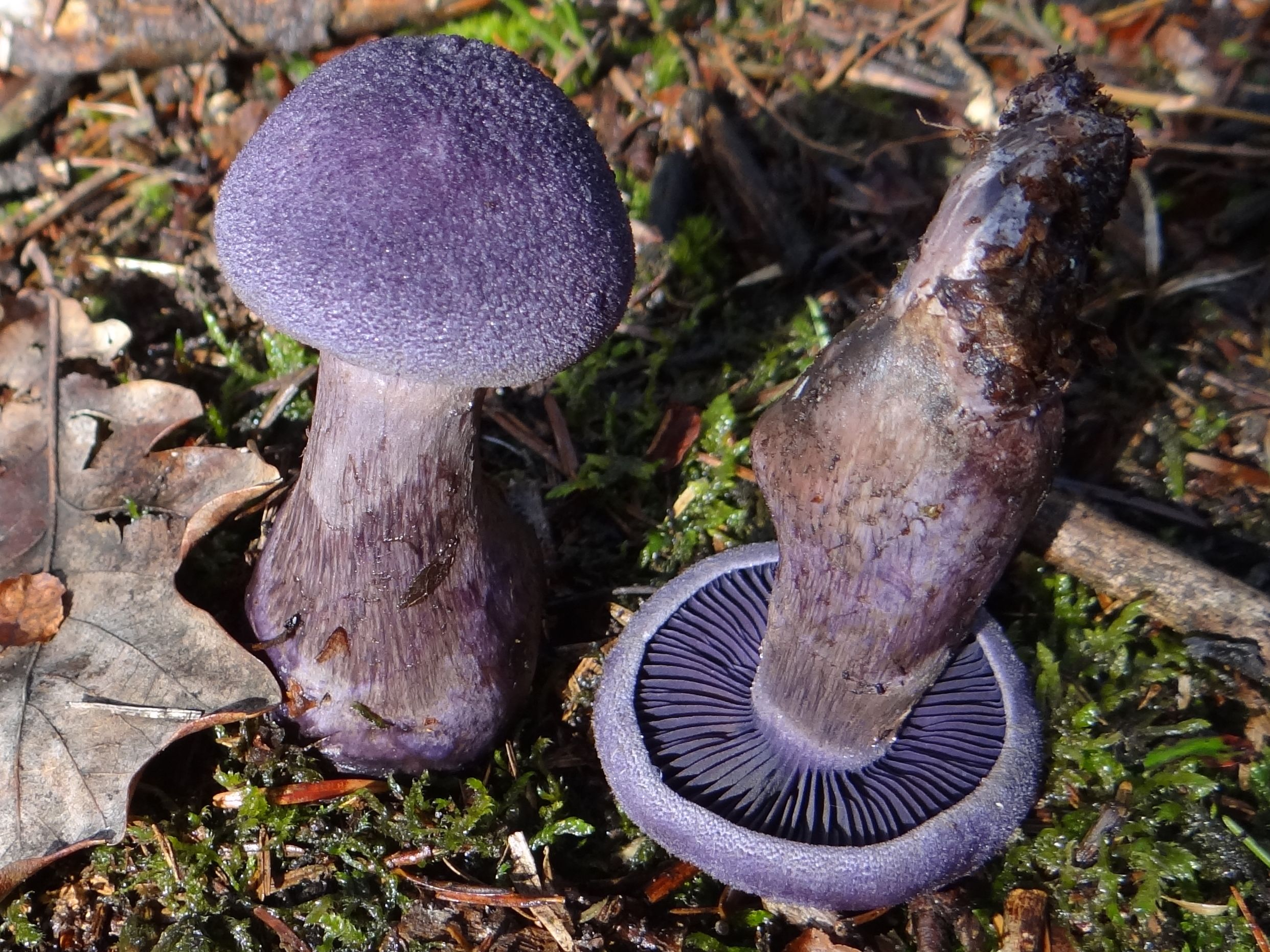
Younger specimens, highlighting scaled cap

Cortinarius violaceus is found across North America, Europe and Asia. Although widespread, it is not common anywhere in Europe, and it is listed as endangered in the British Isles. Cortinarius violaceus is a rare component of subarctic areas of western Greenland.

In Europe, it grows in deciduous woodland during autumn, especially among oak, birch and beech, but is also found on occasion with conifers. It is also occasionally known from treeless heathland, where it is associated with bracken. The species favours acidic soil. Cortinarius violaceus forms mycorrhizal associations with several species of tree. In this symbiotic relationship, the fungus gains carbon from the plant and supplies it with beneficial minerals. In Nordic countries, its hosts include white birch (Betula pubescens), silver birch (B. pendula), European aspen (Populus tremula) and rarely European beech (Fagus sylvatica). No records of association with oak (Quercus) are known from this region. Brandrud reported that what he described as spp. hercynicus grew with Picea abies, generally in more alkaline soils and along with mosses of the genera Hylocomium and Pleurozium, and, in moister areas, big shaggy-moss (Rhytidiadelphus triquetrus), as well as the buttercup-family shrub Hepatica nobilis. The species grows with Betula pubescens in Greenland, and is also associated with hazelnut (Corylus avellana) in Central and Southern Europe.

In North America, C. violaceus favours conifers, and, though rare over much of the continent, is relatively common in certain areas, including Mount Rainier National Park and Olympic National Park. It is more common in old growth forest in the Pacific Northwest, though has sprung up in regrowth areas populated with fir, pine, aspen and alder in the Great Lakes region. Fruit bodies occur singly or in small groups, often near rotting wood, and can grow in fairy rings. Closely related species that look like C. violaceus can be found in Central and South America, Australia, New Zealand, Papua New Guinea, and Malaysia.

== Edibility and biochemistry ==
Cortinarius violaceus are sometimes considered inedible, and sometimes considered edible, but not choice. Instead, the primary appeal of the species to mushroom hunters, according to Arora, is its beauty. Its similarity to some other (inedible or toxic) webcaps renders it risky to eat. The taste after cooking is reportedly bitter.

The colour of C. violaceus hasn't been recorded for conversion into a dye, unlike that of some other Cortinarius species, such as C. sanguineus and C. semisanguineus. The colour is caused by an elusive pigment that has been difficult to isolate; its identity was not known until 1998. This is an iron(III) complex of (R)-3′,4′-dihydroxy-β-phenylalanine [(R)-β-dopa]. It dissolves in water, turning the liquid dark purple before fading to blackish-grey. C. violaceus fruiting bodies contain around 100 times more iron than those of most other fungi. Cortinarius violaceus extract demonstrates an inhibitory activity against cysteine protease.

== See also ==
- List of Cortinarius species
