= Friedrich Otto Wünsche =

German mycologist (1839–1905)

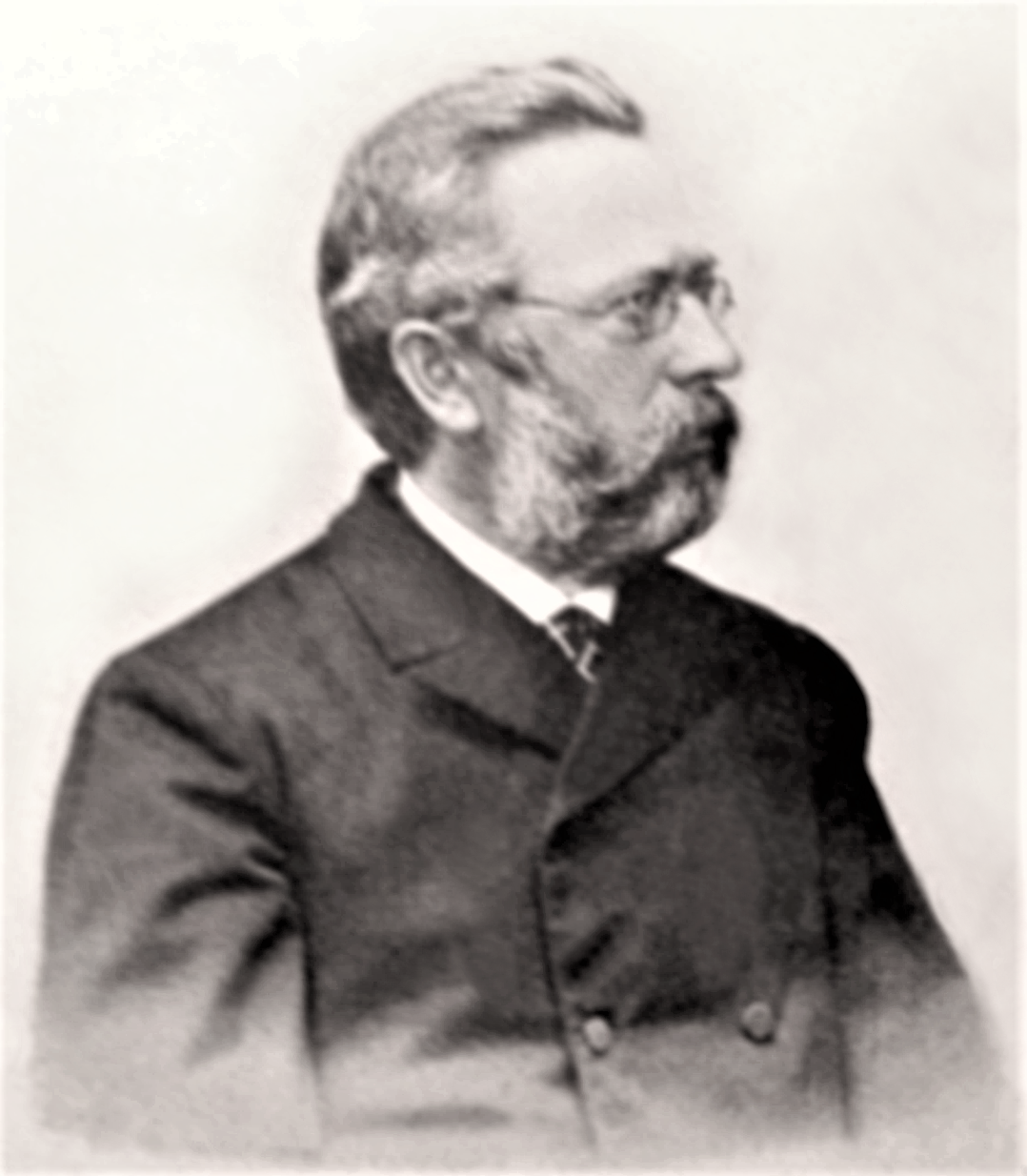
Friedrich Otto Wünsche in 1912

Friedrich Otto Wünsche (1839–1905) was a German mycologist. A teacher by profession, he authored influential field guides including the widely used Die Pflanzen Deutschlands ("The plants of Germany") and produced some of the first accessible handbooks on German fungi and cryptogams. Despite lacking formal university training, he received an honorary doctorate from the University of Leipzig in 1871 and was later awarded the title of Professor in recognition of his contributions to botanical education and regional flora studies.

== Life ==
Friedrich Otto Wünsche was born on 19 March 1839 in the village of Milkel near Bautzen, Saxony, where his father worked as an estate gardener. Encouraged by early exposure to plants, he trained for the teaching profession at the Bautzen seminary (1855–1859) and held brief posts in Bernbach and Zittau. During his Zittau years he organised frequent excursions into the surrounding uplands and founded the natural science and mountaineering club "Globus". In 1867 Wünsche was appointed to teach the natural sciences at the Zwickau gymnasium, later adding geography to his duties. Ill health forced his retirement in 1903, and he died from a cerebral haemorrhage in Zwickau on 6 January 1905.

== Botanical publications and teaching aids ==
Feeling the lack of an up-to-date field guide for students, Wünsche adopted the analytical (dichotomous key) method and produced Exkursionsflora für das Königreich Sachsen ("Field guide to the flora of the Kingdom of Saxony") (1869). Its success led to further editions and to the expansive Schulflora von Deutschland (1871), retitled Die Pflanzen Deutschlands ("The plants of Germany") from the 7th edition (1897). He followed with a dissertation on the Saxon pteridophytes, Filices Saxonicae ("The ferns of Saxony") (1871, 2nd ed. 1878), and a succinct guide to the higher cryptogams, Die Kryptogamen Deutschlands ("The cryptogams of Germany") (1876). A practical handbook on fungi, Die Pilze (1877), offered one of the first accessible overviews of German macromycetes (mushroom-forming fungi). Later works included Schulflora, 1. Teil: Die niederen Pflanzen ("School flora, Part 1: The lower plants") (1889) and the popular pocket guide Die Alpenpflanzen (The alpine plants")(1893; 2nd ed. 1896). To reach less affluent readers he also issued abridged booklets such as Die verbreitetsten Pflanzen Deutschlands ("The most widespread plants of Germany") (1894, 4th ed. 1903) and comparable titles on beetles and fungi.

== Local floristic work and societal service ==
Alongside national handbooks, Wünsche investigated the vegetation around Zwickau, publishing Vorarbeiten zu einer Flora von Zwickau ("Preparatory studies for a flora of Zwickau") (1874) and a series of Beiträge zur Kenntnis der Flora von Sachsen ("Contributions to the knowledge of Saxony's flora") between 1874 and 1891. His expertise was sought by the extended committee for the multi-volume Flora von Deutschland ("Flora of Germany") project, for which he reported on new records from the Upper Saxon region (1884–86). From 1886 he chaired the Verein für Naturkunde ("Society for Natural History") in Zwickau, becoming honorary chairman in 1903; he was also a corresponding member of the Dresden society "Isis" and belonged to the German Society for Plant Sciences from its foundation.

== Honours ==
The University of Leipzig awarded Wünsche the doctorate in 1871 on the strength of Filices Saxonicae, despite his lack of formal university study. He received the honorary title of Professor in 1891 and the "Knight's Cross, First Class", of the Albert Order in 1899.
