= Alec Wood =

Australian mycologist

Alec E. Wood (10 September 1933 - 23 March 2016) was a mycologist affiliated with the University of New South Wales in Sydney, Australia who published major studies, describing a large number of new species, in the genera Galerina and Amanita. With Tom May, he co-authored Fungi of Australia Volume 2A, Catalogue and Bibliography of Australian Macrofungi - Basidiomycota in 1997.

He also authored popular identification books on Australian fungi.

== See also ==
- List of mycologists
- Fungi of Australia
