= List of Cortinarius species =

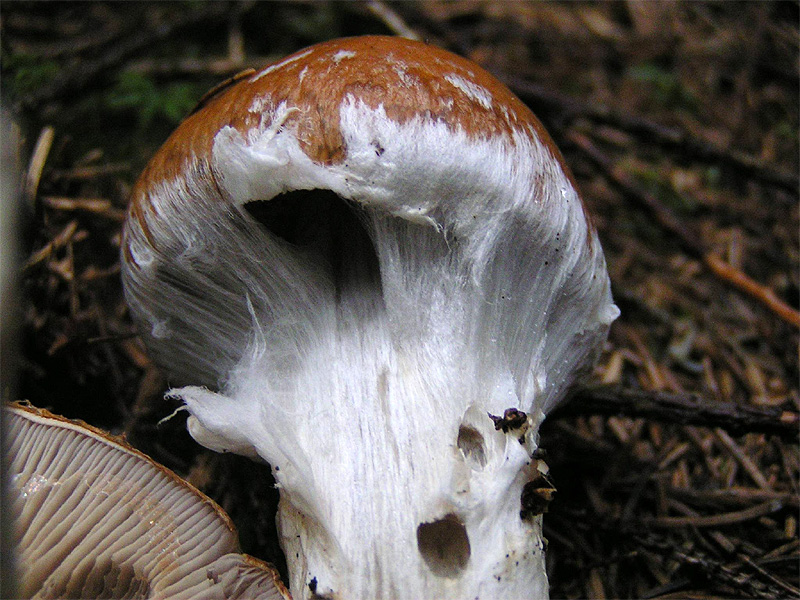
The cortina around the fungi which gives name to the genus.

With around 2000 species, Cortinarius is the biggest genus of fungi that form mushrooms. Apart from a few species such as C. caperatus, many even so-called edible species appear to have very similar species that are at least inedible if not poisonous, or otherwise may differ in edibility geographically.

The following species are recognised in the genus Cortinarius:

A B C D E F G H I J K L M N O P Q R S T U V W X Y Z

== A ==
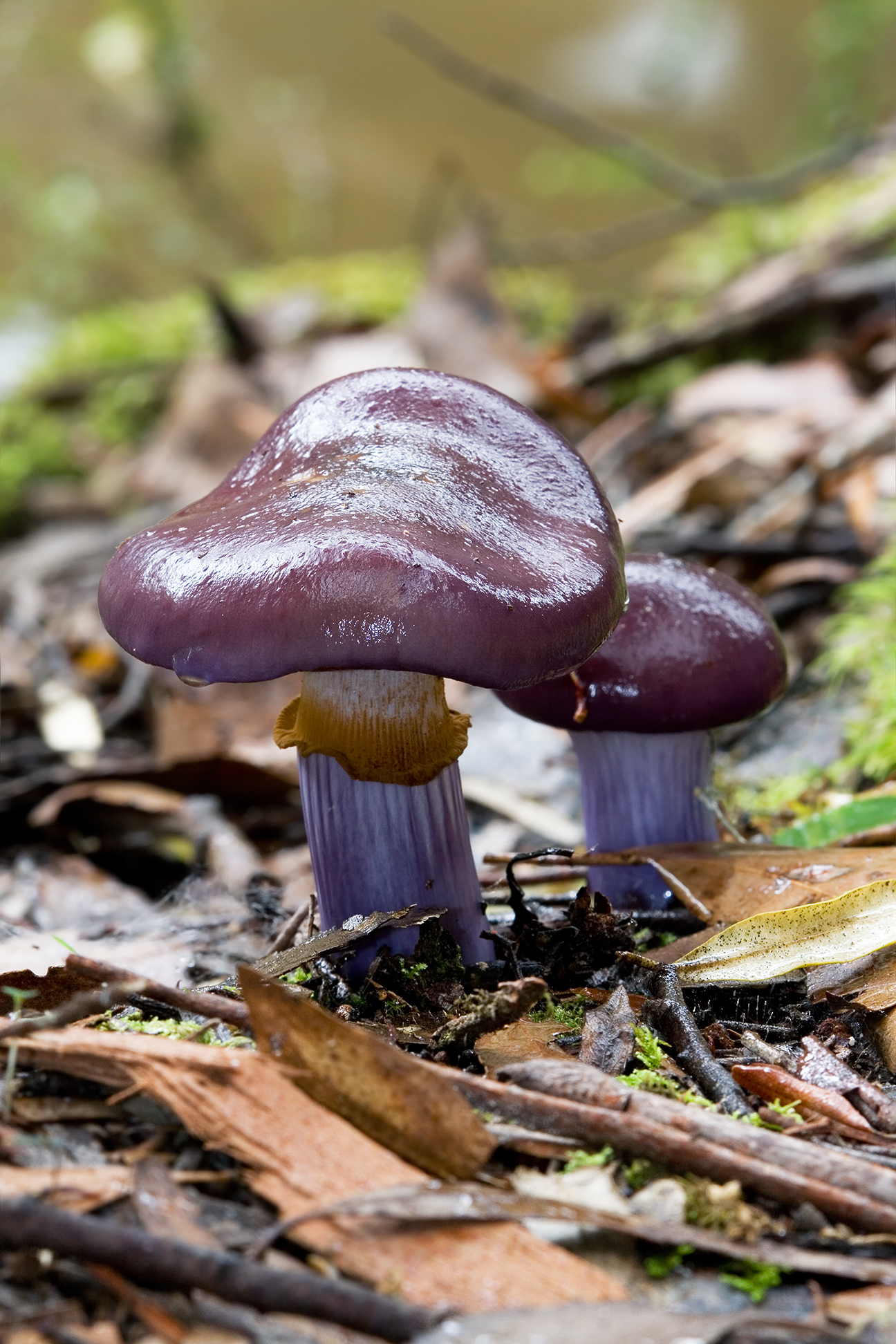
C. archeri Berk. 1859

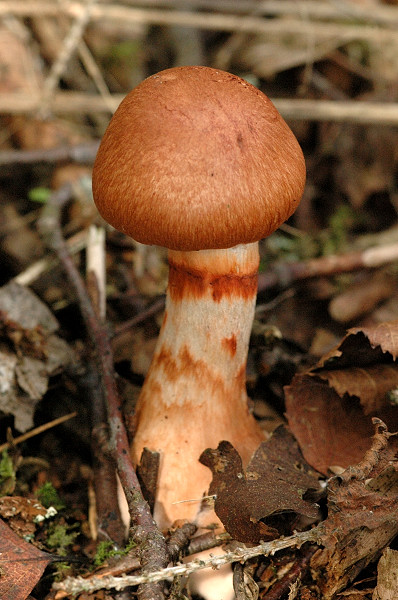
C. allutus Fr. 1838

- Cortinarius aavae Liimat. & Niskanen (2012)
- Cortinarius abditus Rob. Henry (1993) – France
- Cortinarius aberrans Rob. Henry (1952) – France
- Cortinarius abietinus (Velen.) J. Favre ex Bon (1986)
- Cortinarius abjectus Bidaud, Carteret & Reumaux (2013)
- Cortinarius abnormis Watling & T.W. May (1992) – Western Australia
- Cortinarius absarokensis M.M. Moser & McKnight (1987) – US (Montana)
- Cortinarius absinthiacus M.M. Moser (1975) – Argentina
- Cortinarius acerbiformis Reumaux (1992) – France
- Cortinarius acerbus M.M. Moser & E. Horak (1975) – Argentina
- Cortinarius acetosus (Velen.) Melot (1987)
- Cortinarius achrous E. Horak, Peintner, M.M. Moser & Vilgalys (2002) – New Zealand
- Cortinarius achyrocephalus Melot (1989)
- Cortinarius aciegemmascens Rob. Henry (1991)
- Cortinarius acigemmascens Rob. Henry (1970) – France
- Cortinarius aciserratus Rob. Henry (1988)
- Cortinarius acutellus Bidaud & Moënne-Locc. (2003) – France
- Cortinarius acutibulbus Chevassut & Rob. Henry (1982) – France
- Cortinarius acutipapillatus Gasparini (2014)
- Cortinarius acutispissipes Rob. Henry (1981) – France
- Cortinarius acutoaltus Chevassut & Rob. Henry (1982) – France
- Cortinarius acutocephalus Bidaud (1997) – France
- Cortinarius acutoides Peck (1910)
- Cortinarius acutomammosus Rob. Henry (1988)
- Cortinarius acutopholiotoides Palazón & Mahiques (2007)
- Cortinarius acutoproximus Liimat. & Niskanen (2022)
- Cortinarius acutorum Rob. Henry (1988)
- Cortinarius acutovelatus Rob. Henry (1988)
- Cortinarius acutus (Pers.) Fr. (1838)
- Cortinarius adalbertii J. Favre ex M.M. Moser (1980)
- Cortinarius adarmeniacus Rob. Henry (1970)
- Cortinarius addamascenus Rob. Henry (1983)
- Cortinarius adfocalis Rob. Henry (1989)
- Cortinarius adobtusus Rob. Henry (1968)
- Cortinarius adrianae Ovrebo, Ammirati, Dima & Liimat. (2022)
- Cortinarius adustorimosus Rob. Henry (1988)
- Cortinarius adustus Peck (1889)
- Cortinarius aequalipes Rob. Henry (1988)
- Cortinarius aequatus Rob. Henry (1952)
- Cortinarius aereus Rob. Henry (1952)
- Cortinarius aerugineoconicus E. Horak (1990) - New Zealand
- Cortinarius afropurpurissimus C. Sharp (2020)
- Cortinarius aganochrous E. Horak (1975)
- Cortinarius agathosmus Brandrud, H. Lindstr. & Melot (1989)
- Cortinarius agnetis Melot (1989)
- Cortinarius ahsii McKnight (1975)
- Cortinarius aiacapiiae Speg. (1887)
- Cortinarius ainsworthii Liimat. & Niskanen (2020) – UK
- Cortinarius alaskaensis Liimat. & Niskanen (2021)
- Cortinarius albiceps Murrill (1942)
- Cortinarius albidifolius Peck (1888)
- Cortinarius albidiformis Murrill (1946)
- Cortinarius albidipes Peck (1912)
- Cortinarius albidoavellaneus Kauffman & A.H. Sm. (1933)
- Cortinarius albidodiscus Bidaud & Fillion (1993)
- Cortinarius albidofuscescens Herp. (1912)
- Cortinarius albidogriseus Bidaud & Reumaux (1993)
- Cortinarius albidulus Murrill (1939)
- Cortinarius albidus Peck (1891) – (North America)
- Cortinarius alboadustus Bidaud (2012)
- Cortinarius alboambitus Niskanen, Liimat. & Ammirati (2013)
- Cortinarius alboannulatus Contu (2001)
- Cortinarius albobrunnescens Liimat. & Niskanen (2021)
- Cortinarius albobrunneus M.M. Moser (1975)
- Cortinarius albobrunnoides M.M. Moser (1975)
- Cortinarius albocanus (E. Horak & M.M. Moser) Peintner & M.M. Moser (2002)
- Cortinarius albocinctus M.M. Moser (1975)
- Cortinarius albocyaneus Fr. (1851)
- Cortinarius albofimbriatus Rob. Henry (1940)
- Cortinarius albofulminescens Rob. Henry (1992)
- Cortinarius albogaudis Kytöv., Niskanen & Liimat. (2009)
- Cortinarius alboglobosus Kytöv., Liimat., Niskanen & Ammirati (2014)
- Cortinarius albolens Bidaud, Carteret & Reumaux (2012)
- Cortinarius albolutescens Reumaux (2001)
- Cortinarius alboluteus Lebeuf, Andre Paul, Liimat., Niskanen & Ammirati (2018)
- Cortinarius albomaculatus Rob. Henry (1988)
- Cortinarius albomalus Liimat. & Niskanen (2021)
- Cortinarius albonigrellus J. Favre (1955)
- Cortinarius albo-ochraceus M.M. Moser (1975)
- Cortinarius alboroseus (R. Heim) Peintner, E. Horak, M.M. Moser & Vilgalys (2002)
- Cortinarius alborufescens Imler (1955)
- Cortinarius albosericeus Ammirati, Beug, Liimat., Niskanen & O. Ceska (2016)
- Cortinarius albovariegatus (Velen.) Melot (1980)
- Cortinarius albovestitus Bidaud (2001)
- Cortinarius alboviolaceus (Pers.) Zawadzki (1835) – silver-violet webcap (Europe)
- Cortinarius alcalisensibilis (M.M. Moser) G. Garnier (1991)
- Cortinarius alces Niskanen & Liimat. (2021)
- Cortinarius aleuriodor Rob. Henry (1981)
- Cortinarius aleuriolens Chevassut & Rob. Henry (1982)
- Cortinarius aleuriosmus Maire (1910) – Europe
- Cortinarius algonquinensis Ammirati, Liimat. & Niskanen (2014)
- Cortinarius alienatus (E. Horak) G. Garnier (1991)
- Cortinarius alkalivirens Høil. & Watling (1990)
- Cortinarius allutoides Rob. Henry (1986)
- Cortinarius allutus Fr. (1838)
- Cortinarius alneti Bidaud (1996)
- Cortinarius alneus M.M. Moser (1967)
- Cortinarius alnophilus (M.M. Moser) Nespiak (1981)
- Cortinarius alopecurus (Velen.) G. Garnier (1991)
- Cortinarius alpicola (Bon) Bon (1992)
- Cortinarius alpinus Boud. (1895)
- Cortinarius alter Bidaud & Reumaux (2002)
- Cortinarius alterplex Reumaux (1996)
- Cortinarius altissimus E. Harrower & T.W. Henkel (2015) – Guyana
- Cortinarius altomellitus Rob. Henry (1985)
- Cortinarius alutaceo-olivascens Rob. Henry (1959)
- Cortinarius alutaceopallens (Rob. Henry) Bidaud (2009)
- Cortinarius alutarius Kałucka & Liimat. (2021)
- Cortinarius amanitopsidoides Rob. Henry (1995)
- Cortinarius amarellus Bidaud & Reumaux (1993)
- Cortinarius amarissimus Murrill (1946)
- Cortinarius amarocaerulescens Bidaud (2009)
- Cortinarius amarus Peck (1880)
- Cortinarius amazonicus Singer & I.J.A. Aguiar (1983)
- Cortinarius ambiens Rob. Henry (1956)
- Cortinarius amblyonis Soop (2016)
- Cortinarius americanospilomeus Liimat. & Niskanen (2021)
- Cortinarius americanus A.H. Sm. (1934)
- Cortinarius amici-mei Reumaux (2016)
- Cortinarius amigochrous Kühner (1989)
- Cortinarius ammiratii Liimat. & Niskanen (2014)
- Cortinarius ammoniacosplendens Chevassut & Rob. Henry (1978)
- Cortinarius ammophiloides Bohus (1979)
- Cortinarius amoenus (M.M. Moser & E. Horak) G. Garnier (1991)
- Cortinarius amurceus Fr. (1838)
- Cortinarius anauensis Soop (2001)
- Cortinarius andreae H. Lindstr. (1999)
- Cortinarius anfractoides Rob. Henry & Trescol (1987)
- Cortinarius anfractus Fr. (1838)
- Cortinarius angelesianus A.H. Sm. (1944)
- Cortinarius angustilamellatus Herp. (1912)
- Cortinarius angustisporus Kytöv., Niskanen & Liimat. (2014)
- Cortinarius anisatus H. Lindstr., Kytöv. & Niskanen (2005)
- Cortinarius anisochrous Kytöv., Liimat., Niskanen & H. Lindstr. (2013) – Europe
- Cortinarius anisodorus (E. Horak) Peintner & M.M. Moser (2002)
- Cortinarius annae-maritae Bendiksen & Brandrud (2015)
- Cortinarius annulatus Peck (1890)
- Cortinarius anocorium Liimat. & Niskanen (2021)
- Cortinarius anomalellus Soop (1999)
- Cortinarius anomalobrunneus Corrales, Ovrebo, Ammirati, Dima & Liimat. (2022)
- Cortinarius anomalodelicatus Ammirati, Liimat., Niskanen & Dima (2021)
- Cortinarius anomalomontanus Ammirati, Liimat., Niskanen & Dima (2021)
- Cortinarius anomalopacificus Bojantchev, Liimat., Niskanen, Dima & Ammirati (2021)
- Cortinarius anomalovelatus Ammirati, Berbee, E. Harrower, Liimat. & Niskanen (2014)
- Cortinarius anomalus (Fr.) Fr. (1838)
- Cortinarius anserinus (Velen.) Rob. Henry (1986) – Europe
- Cortinarius antarcticus Speg. (1887) – Europe
- Cortinarius anthracinicolor Reumaux (2001) – Europe
- Cortinarius anthracinus (Fr.) E. Berger (1846)
- Cortinarius anuliferus M.M. Moser (1975)
- Cortinarius apius Y. Lamoureux, Liimat. & Niskanen (2021)
- Cortinarius apomorphus Rob. Henry (1989)
- Cortinarius appalachiensis K.W. Hughes, E. Harrower, Ammirati, Niskanen & Liimat. (2014)
- Cortinarius appennini Consiglio, D. Antonini & M. Antonini (2005)
- Cortinarius aprinus Melot (1989)
- Cortinarius aptecohaerens Rob. Henry (1983)
- Cortinarius aquosus Bidaud & Fillion (2005)
- Cortinarius arachnoideus (Krombh.) Bidaud, Moënne-Locc. & Reumaux (1996)
- Cortinarius araneosovolvatus (Bon & Gaugué) Melot (1989)
- Cortinarius araniiti Soop (2014)
- Cortinarius arcabucensis M.M. Moser (1975)
- Cortinarius arcanus G. Moreno, Heykoop & E. Horak (2005)
- Cortinarius archeri Berk. (1859) – Australia
- Cortinarius arcifolius Rob. Henry (1936) – Europe
- Cortinarius ardesiacusGasparini (2008) – Australia
- Cortinarius aremoricus Rob. Henry (1985)
- Cortinarius argentatus (Pers.) Fr. (1838)
- Cortinarius argenteobovinus Armada & J.D. Reyes (2021)
- Cortinarius argenteocrinitus Rob. Henry (1984)
- Cortinarius argenteohygrophanus M.M. Moser (1975)
- Cortinarius argenteopileatus Nezdojm. (1983)
- Cortinarius argentostriaepes Chevassut & Rob. Henry (1982)
- Cortinarius argentum-silvae Melot (1989)
- Cortinarius argillaceoincarnatus Rob. Henry (1956)
- Cortinarius argillohygrophanicus M.M. Moser & E. Horak (1975)
- Cortinarius argillopallidus Jul. Schäff. (1947)
- Cortinarius argutiformis Rob. Henry (1961)
- Cortinarius argutipes Bidaud & Reumaux (1996)
- Cortinarius argyronotus Bidaud (2008)
- Cortinarius argyrophilus Rob. Henry (1952)
- Cortinarius aridus M.M. Moser (1975)
- Cortinarius armeniacellus Rob. Henry (1988)
- Cortinarius armeniacovelatus (Bougher, Fuhrer & E. Horak) Peintner, E. Horak, M.M. Moser & Vilgalys (2002)
- Cortinarius armeniacus (Schaeff.) Zawadzki (1835)
- Cortinarius armentaceus (Velen.) G. Garnier (1991)
- Cortinarius armillariellus Rob. Henry (1940)
- Cortinarius armillariopsis Rob. Henry (1970)
- Cortinarius armillatoazureus Bidaud & Fillion (2004)
- Cortinarius armillatus (Fr.) Fr. (1838) – bracelet cortinar (North America)
- Cortinarius arnoldae Murrill (1940)
- Cortinarius aromaticus (Velen.) Reumaux (2002)
- Cortinarius aromatizans Bidaud & Reumaux (2004)
- Cortinarius arquatus (Alb. & Schwein.) Fr. (1838)
- Cortinarius arvinaceoides Bidaud (2000)
- Cortinarius arvinaceus Fr. (1838)
- Cortinarius asper Peck (1872)
- Cortinarius assiduus Mahiques, A. Ortega & Bidaud (2001)
- Cortinarius athabascus Bojantchev (2013) – North America
- Cortinarius atkinsiae Matheny, Ammirati, Liimat. & Niskanen (2021)
- Cortinarius atkinsonianus Kauffman (1905)
- Cortinarius atratus (Rodway) Gasparini (2014)
- Cortinarius atrialbus Murrill (1945)
- Cortinarius atribadius Murrill (1945)
- Cortinarius atroacutus E. Horak & M.M. Moser (1975)
- Cortinarius atroalbus M.M. Moser (1993)
- Cortinarius atrocaeruleus M.M. Moser (1967)
- Cortinarius atrocinereus (Velen.) G. Garnier (1991)
- Cortinarius atrocoeruleoides Bidaud (2013)
- Cortinarius atrofuscus (Velen.) Reumaux (1982)
- Cortinarius atrolazulinus M.M. Moser (1987) – New Zealand
- Cortinarius atropileatus A.R. Nilsen & Orlovich (2018) – New Zealand
- Cortinarius atropurpureus (E. Horak) Kuhn.-Fink. & Peintner (2003)
- Cortinarius atropusillus J. Favre (1960)
- Cortinarius atrotomentosus E. Harrower (2015) – US (Florida)
- Cortinarius atroviolaceus M.M. Moser (1987)
- Cortinarius atrox Reumaux (2013)
- Cortinarius attenuatus (Velen.) G. Garnier (1991)
- Cortinarius auchmerus M.M. Moser (2002)
- Cortinarius aurae Niskanen & Liimat. (2020) – UK
- Cortinarius aurantiacoides Reumaux (1982)
- Cortinarius aurantiellus (E. Horak) G. Garnier (1991)
- Cortinarius aurantiobasis Ammirati & A.H. Sm. (1977) – edible, but deadly look-alikes (C. gentilis)
- Cortinarius aurantiocaeruleus M.M. Moser (2002)
- Cortinarius aurantioferreus Soop (2001)
- Cortinarius aurantiofulvus Hongo (1962)
- Cortinarius aurantiolamellatus E. Ludw. & A. Kasparek (2017)
- Cortinarius aurantiolamellatus E. Ludw. & A. Kasparek (2017)
- Cortinarius aurantiorufus Bidaud (2001)
- Cortinarius aurantiosplendidus Carteret & Reumaux (2008)
- Cortinarius aurantiotinctus Bidaud (2001)
- Cortinarius aurantiovillosus M.M. Moser (1975)
- Cortinarius aurantius (Velen.) G. Garnier (1991)
- Cortinarius aurasiacus Pat. (1902)
- Cortinarius auratior Rob. Henry (1989)
- Cortinarius aureifolius Peck (1885) – edible, but deadly look-alikes (C. gentilis)
- Cortinarius aureobasalis Bidaud & Carteret (2013)
- Cortinarius aureobrunneus Hongo (1978)
- Cortinarius aureobtusus Rob. Henry (2003)
- Cortinarius aureoluteus Bidaud (2001)
- Cortinarius aureomarginatus A. Pearson ex P.D. Orton (1984)
- Cortinarius aureomyceliosus Bidaud (2013)
- Cortinarius aureopigmentatus Ammirati, Halling & Garnica (2007)
- Cortinarius aureovelatus Bendiksen, K. Bendiksen & H. Lindstr. (2008)
- Cortinarius auroripes Carteret & Reumaux (2001)
- Cortinarius austroacutus M.M. Moser (1975)
- Cortinarius austroalbidus Cleland & J.R. Harris (1948)
- Cortinarius austroamericanus San-Fabian, Niskanen & Liimat. (2018)
- Cortinarius austrocausticus Gasparini (2007)
- Cortinarius austrocinnabarinus R.H. Jones & T.W. May (2008) – Australia
- Cortinarius austroclaricolor M.M. Moser & E. Horak (1975)
- Cortinarius austroevernius Cleland & Cheel (1918)
- Cortinarius austronanceiensis (M.M. Moser) G. Garnier (1991)
- Cortinarius austropacificus E. Horak, Peintner, M.M. Moser & Vilgalys (2002)
- Cortinarius austropallescens Grgur. (1997)
- Cortinarius austrorapaceus Soop (2016)
- Cortinarius austrosalor M.M. Moser (1975)
- Cortinarius austroserarius M.M. Moser (1975)
- Cortinarius austrotorvus Gasparini (2008) – Australia
- Cortinarius austrovenetus Cleland (1928) - also known as Dermocybe austroveneta Green Skin-head Australia
- Cortinarius austroviolaceus Gasparini (2001) - Australia
- Cortinarius autumnalis Peck (1872)
- Cortinarius avellaneocoeruleus (M.M. Moser) M.M. Moser (1967)
- Cortinarius avellaneus M.M. Moser (1975)
- Cortinarius avellanofulvus Rob. Henry (1968)
- Cortinarius ayanamii A. Ortega, Vila, Bidaud & Llimona (2000)
- Cortinarius azureocaninus Rob. Henry (1989)
- Cortinarius azureolamellatus C. Sharp (2020)
- Cortinarius azureopallens Rob. Henry (1992)

== B ==
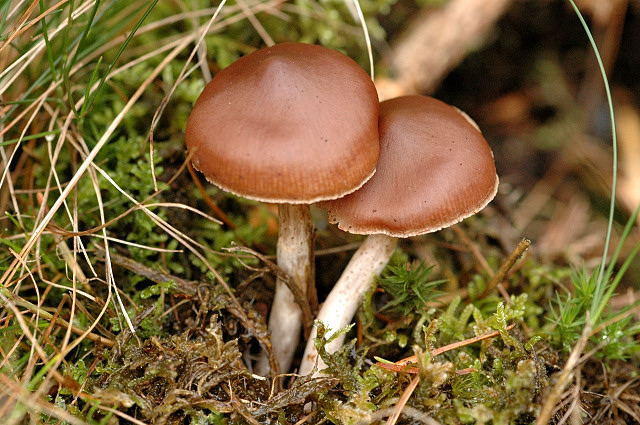
C. brunneus (Pers. 1801) Fr. 1838

- Cortinarius bacillifer E.H.L. Krause (1928)
- Cortinarius badioferrugineus E. Horak, Peintner, M.M. Moser & Vilgalys (2002)
- Cortinarius badioflammescens Rob. Henry (1983)
- Cortinarius badioflavidus Herp. (1912)
- Cortinarius badioflavus Herp. (1912)
- Cortinarius badiolaevis Niskanen, Liimat., Mahiques, Ballarà & Kytöv. (2011)
- Cortinarius badiolatus (M.M. Moser) M.M. Moser (1967)
- Cortinarius badiorufus Bidaud, Moënne-Locc. & Reumaux (2001)
- Cortinarius badiovestitus M.M. Moser (1968)
- Cortinarius badiovinaceus M.M. Moser (1965)
- Cortinarius badius Peck (1888)
- Cortinarius balaustinoides Rob. Henry (1956)
- Cortinarius balaustinus Fr. (1838)
- Cortinarius balteatoscauroides Rob. Henry (1958)
- Cortinarius bambrus Grgur. (1997)
- Cortinarius barlowensis Ammirati, Berbee, E. Harrower, Liimat. & Niskanen (2014)
- Cortinarius basalis Peck (1883)
- Cortinarius basibulbosus Cleland & J.R. Harris (1948)
- Cortinarius basicyaneus Rob. Henry & Trescol ex Bidaud & Eyssart. (2004)
- Cortinarius basililaceus A. Pearson ex P.D. Orton (1984)
- Cortinarius basipurpureus (Bougher) Peintner & M.M. Moser (2002)
- Cortinarius basiroseus A. Pearson ex P.D. Orton (1984)
- Cortinarius basirubescens Cleland & J.R. Harris (1948)
- Cortinarius basitinctus Rob. Henry (1970)
- Cortinarius basivelatus Rob. Henry (1977)
- Cortinarius bataillei (J. Favre ex M.M. Moser) Høil. (1984)
- Cortinarius batschii (Humb.) Melot (1995)
- Cortinarius bayeri (Velen.) Moënne-Locc. & Reumaux (1989)
- Cortinarius beeverorum Orlovich, X.Yue Wang & T. Lebel (2014) – New Zealand
- Cortinarius belleri M.M. Moser (1983)
- Cortinarius bellus E. Horak (1990) - New Zealand
- Cortinarius benovairensis Mahiques (2004)
- Cortinarius bergeronii (Melot) Melot (1992)
- Cortinarius betuletorum M.M. Moser (1967)
- Cortinarius betulinus J. Favre (1948)
- Cortinarius bibulus Quél. (1881)
- Cortinarius bidiscendus Rob. Henry (1985)
- Cortinarius biformis Fr. (1838)
- Cortinarius biodoratus Bidaud & M. Renard (2014)
- Cortinarius birchfieldii Murrill (1952)
- Cortinarius biriensis Brandrud & Dima (2016)
- Cortinarius birkebakii Ammirati, Niskanen & Liimat. (2014)
- Cortinarius bisporus Ballero, Contu & Poli (1995)
- Cortinarius bistreoides Kauffman (1923)
- Cortinarius biveloides Rob. Henry (1948)
- Cortinarius bivelosimilis Kytöv., Niskanen & Liimat. (2017)
- Cortinarius bivelus (Fr.) Fr. (1838)
- Cortinarius blandulus Britzelm. (1885)
- Cortinarius blatensis Pilát (1953)
- Cortinarius bohemicus Carteret & Reumaux (2010)
- Cortinarius bolaris (Pers.) Zawadzki (1835)
- Cortinarius bolbitioides Rob. Henry (1984)
- Cortinarius bombycinus Mahiques & Burguete (2001)
- Cortinarius bonachei J.D. Reyes (2021)
- Cortinarius bonamei Rob. Henry (1970)
- Cortinarius bongardiodor Rob. Henry (1986)
- Cortinarius borealis Bidaud (2005)
- Cortinarius boreasensis A.H. Sm. (1944)
- Cortinarius boreotrichus Kytöv., Niskanen & Liimat. (2017)
- Cortinarius boudieri Rob. Henry (1936)
- Cortinarius boulderensis A.H. Sm. (1944)
- Cortinarius bovarius Liimat. & Niskanen (2013)
- Cortinarius bovinaster Niskanen, Kytöv. & Liimat. (2013) – Europe
- Cortinarius bovinatus Kytöv., Liimat., Niskanen & H. Lindstr. (2013)
- Cortinarius bovinellus M.M. Moser (1968)
- Cortinarius bovinoides M.M. Moser & E. Horak (1975)
- Cortinarius bovinus Fr. (1838) – Europe
- Cortinarius boyacensis Singer (1963)
- Cortinarius boy-scoutorum Bouriquet (1946)
- Cortinarius brachyspermus Peintner & M.M. Moser (2002)
- Cortinarius braendlei Peck (1905)
- Cortinarius brassicolens Melot (1981)
- Cortinarius bresadolanus Moënne-Locc. & Reumaux (1995)
- Cortinarius brevipes Peck (1888)
- Cortinarius breviradicatus Miyauchi & Fujimoto (2007)
- Cortinarius brevirobustus C. Sharp (2020)
- Cortinarius brevisporus M.M. Moser (1975)
- Cortinarius brevissimus Peck (1888)
- Cortinarius bridgei Ammirati, Niskanen, Liimat., Bojantchev & L. Fang (2017)
- Cortinarius britannicus Liimat. & Niskanen (2020) – UK
- Cortinarius britzelmayrii Reumaux (2000)
- Cortinarius brosselini Joachim (1938)
- Cortinarius brunneifolius Kytöv., Niskanen & Liimat. (2008)
- Cortinarius brunneoaffinis Bidaud (2013)
- Cortinarius brunneoalbus Ammirati, Liimat. & Niskanen (2015)
- Cortinarius brunneocalcarius Niskanen, Liimat. & Kytöv. (2012)
- Cortinarius brunneocarpus Razaq & Khalid (2019)
- Cortinarius brunneofibrillosus Ammirati, Beug, Niskanen, Liimat. & Bojantchev (2021)
- Cortinarius brunneofulvus Fr. (1838)
- Cortinarius brunneolimosus A. Pearson (1951)
- Cortinarius brunneo-olivaceus Bidaud, Carteret, Reumaux & Moënne-Locc. (2012)
- Cortinarius brunneo-olivascens M.M. Moser (1975)
- Cortinarius brunneoperonatus Liimat. & Niskanen (2021)
- Cortinarius brunneorubripes Melot (1992)
- Cortinarius brunneotinctus Niskanen, Liimat., Ammirati, André Paul & Lebeuf (2012)
- Cortinarius brunneovelatus M.M. Moser & E. Horak (1975)
- Cortinarius brunneovernus Niskanen, Liimat. & Ammirati (2013)
- Cortinarius brunneovirescens M.M. Moser (1975)
- Cortinarius brunneovolvatus A. Mateos & J.D. Reyes (2021)
- Cortinarius brunneus (Pers.) Fr. (1838)
- Cortinarius bubulus Liimat., Kytov. & Niskanen (2020)
- Cortinarius bulbopodius (Chevassut & Rob. Henry) Bidaud & Reumaux (2004)
- Cortinarius bulbosoides Bidaud & Carteret (2010)
- Cortinarius bulbosomustellinus M.M. Moser & E. Horak (1975)
- Cortinarius bulbosus (Sowerby) Gray (1821)
- Cortinarius bulboviolascens Rob. Henry (1997)
- Cortinarius bulbulipes Rob. Henry (1989)
- Cortinarius bulliardii (Pers.) Fr. (1838)
- Cortinarius bulliardioides Rob. Henry (1956)
- Cortinarius bundarus Grgur. (1989)

== C ==
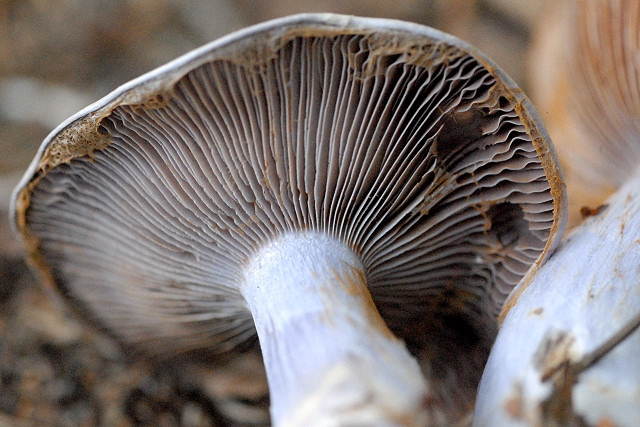
C. caerulescens (Schaeff. 1774) Fr. 1838

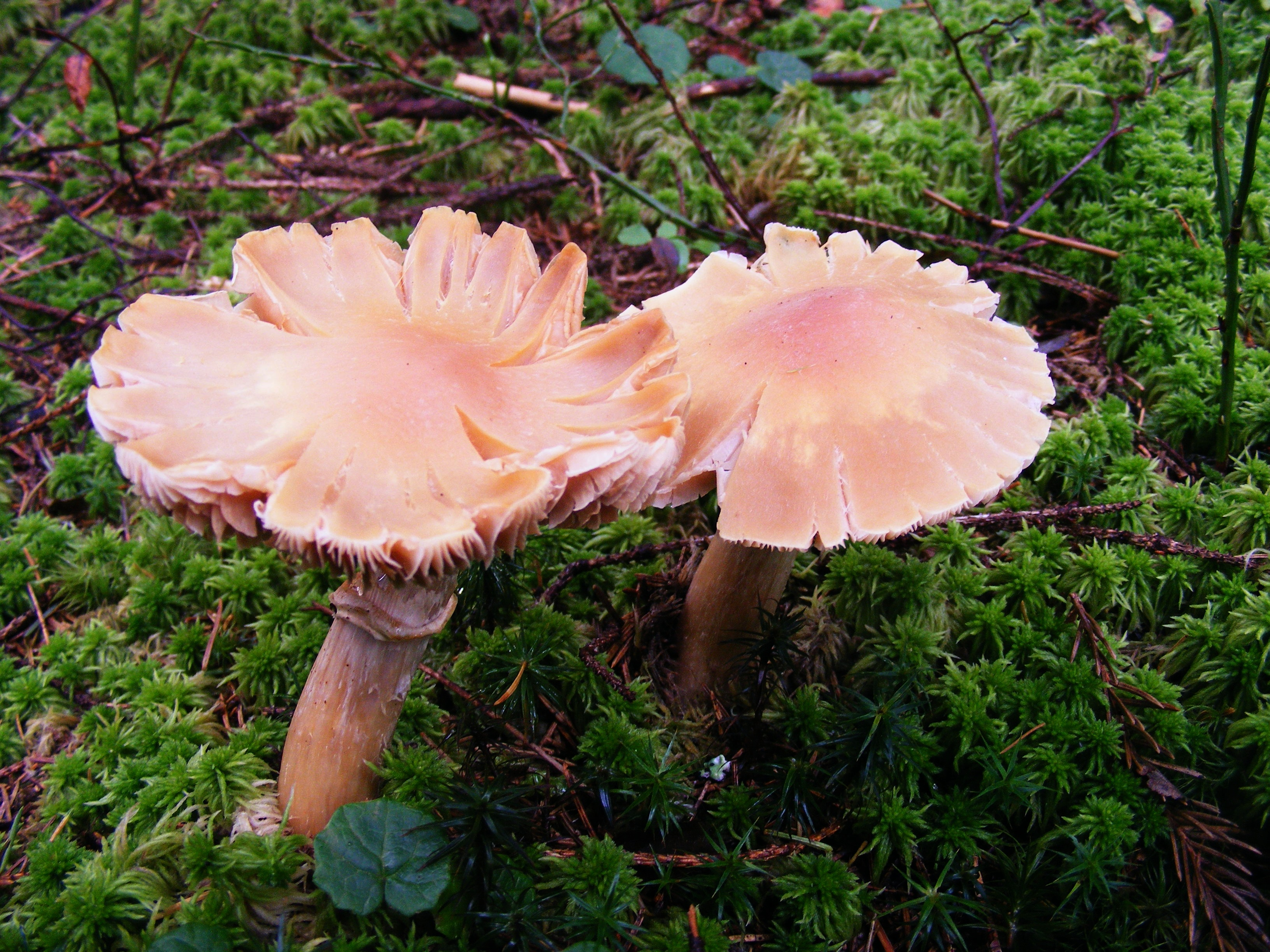
C. caperatus (Pers. 1796) Fr. 1838

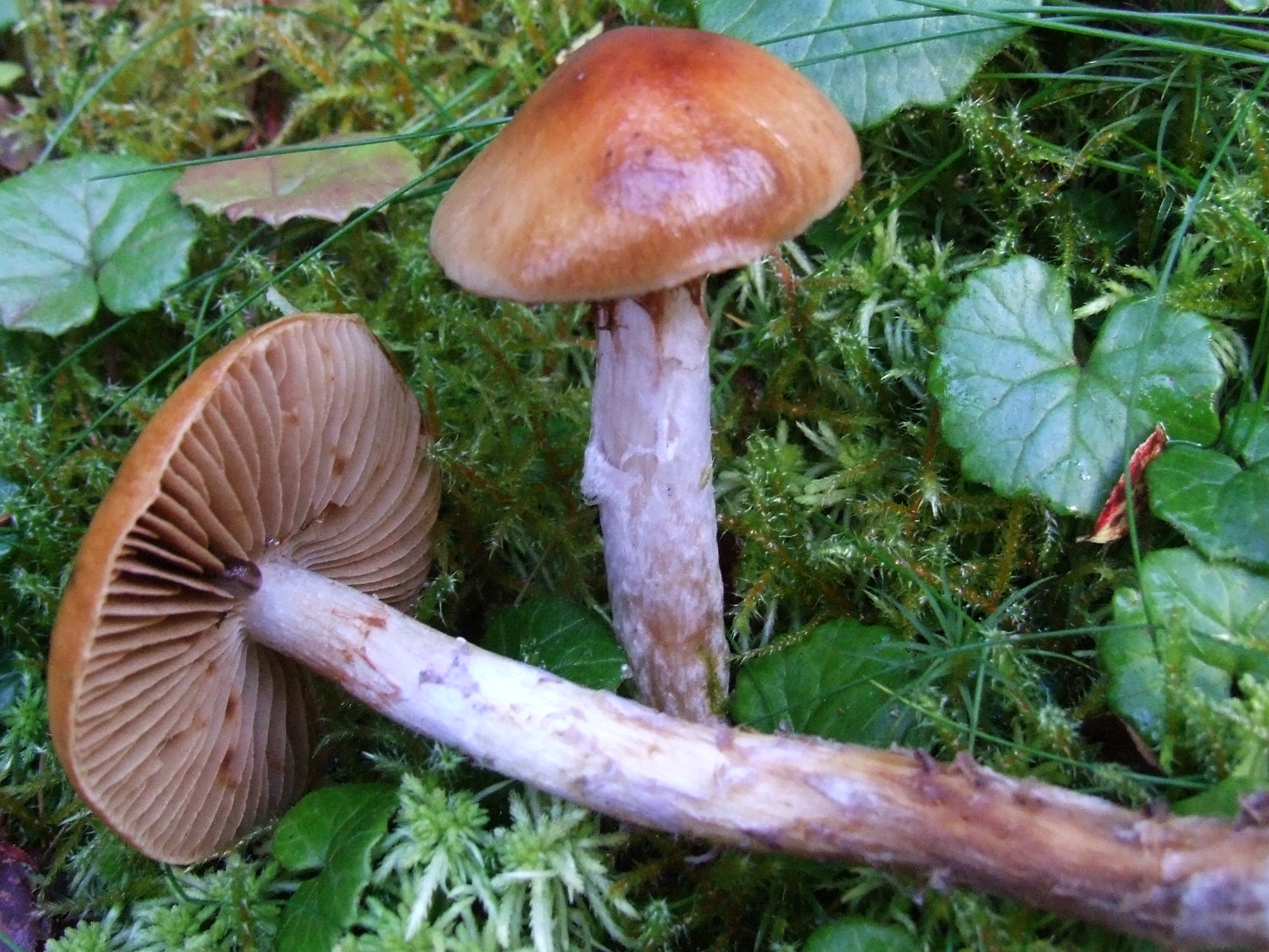
C. collinitus (Sow. 1796) Gray 1821

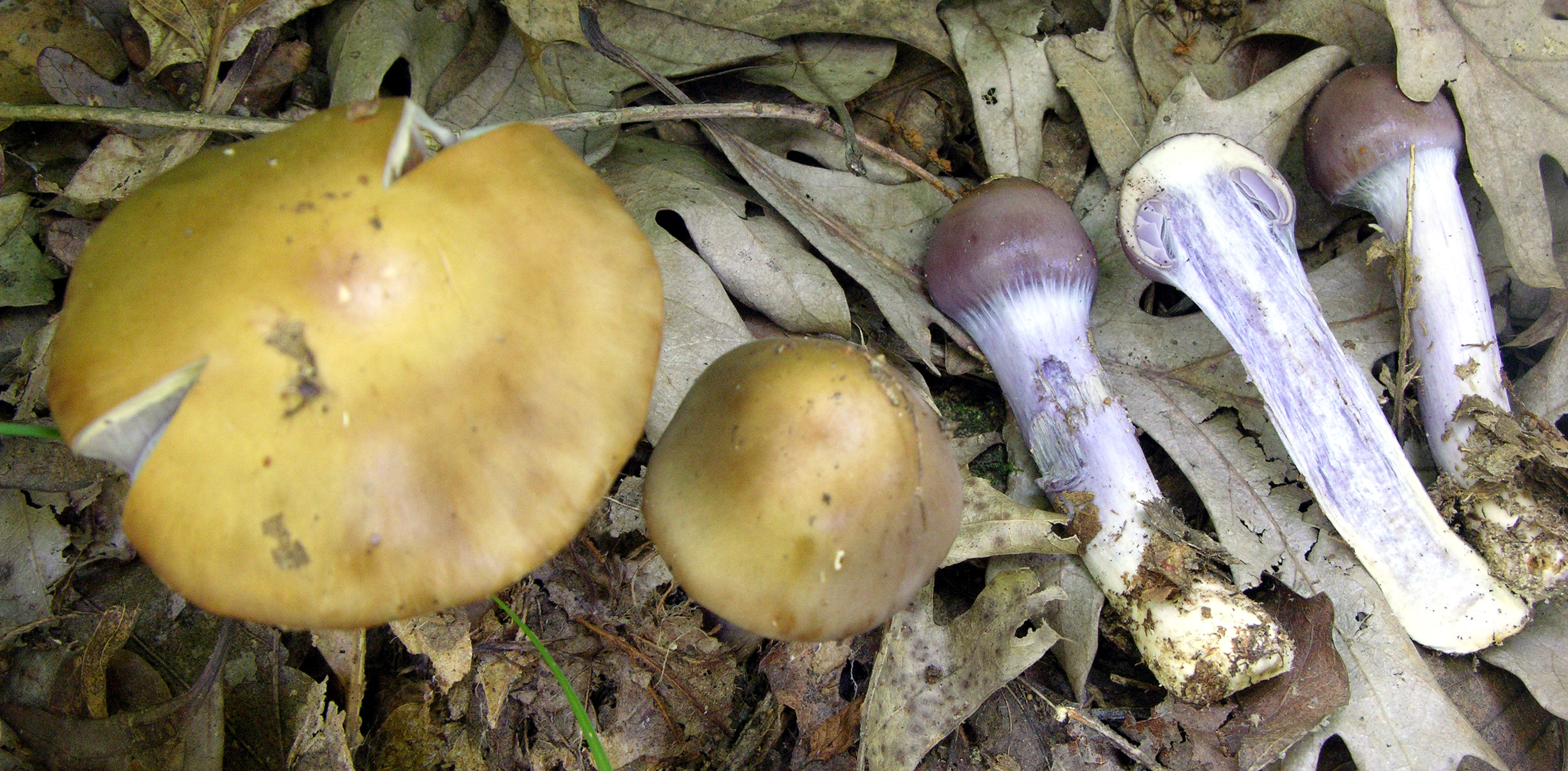
C. cylindripes Kauffman 1905

- Cortinarius cabrinii (Raithelh.) Peintner & M.M. Moser (2002) – Argentina
- Cortinarius cacainus (Velen.) G. Garnier (1991)
- Cortinarius cacaocolor A.H. Sm. (1944)
- Cortinarius cadaverolens Moënne-Locc. & Reumaux (2002) – France
- Cortinarius cadi-aguirrei Garrido-Ben., Ballarà & Mahiques (2015)
- Cortinarius caelicolor M.M. Moser & E. Horak (1975)
- Cortinarius caeruleoanomalus Dima, Matheny, K. Hughes & Ammirati (2021)
- Cortinarius caeruleoeburneus Gasparini (2007) – Australia
- Cortinarius caeruleo-ochrascens Chevassut & Rob. Henry (1975) – France
- Cortinarius caerulescens (Schaeff.) Fr. (1838) – mealy bigfoot webcap
- Cortinarius caesiifolius A.H. Sm. (1939) – US
- Cortinarius caesioarmeniacus Kytöv., Niskanen & Liimat. (2014)
- Cortinarius caesiobrunneus Kytöv., Niskanen & Liimat. (2009) – Finland
- Cortinarius caesiocanescens M.M. Moser (1952) – Austria
- Cortinarius caesionigrellus Lamoure (1978) – France
- Cortinarius caesiopallens P. Karst. (1905)
- Cortinarius caesiopallescens Bidaud, Moënne-Locc. & Reumaux (1993)
- Cortinarius caesiostramenius Rob. Henry (1939)
- Cortinarius cagei Melot (1990)
- Cortinarius calaisopus Soop (2013)
- Cortinarius calcialpinus Senn-Irlet (2012)
- Cortinarius calcofractus Liimat. & Niskanen (2022)
- Cortinarius californicus A.H. Sm. (1939)
- Cortinarius caliginosus Bidaud, Moënne-Locc. & Reumaux (2000)
- Cortinarius calopus P. Karst. (1881)
- Cortinarius calosporus (M. Zang) Peintner, M.M. Moser, E. Horak & Vilgalys (2002)
- Cortinarius calyculatus M.M. Moser (1952)
- Cortinarius calyptophaeus Rob. Henry (1984)
- Cortinarius campanulatus (Velen.) G. Garnier (1991)
- Cortinarius campanulobtusus (Berk. & Broome ex Zeller & C.W. Dodge) Peintner & M.M. Moser (2002)
- Cortinarius campbelliae (Berk. & Broome ex Zeller & C.W. Dodge) Peintner & M.M. Moser (2002)
- Cortinarius campester Reumaux (2001)
- Cortinarius campestris Murrill (1945)
- Cortinarius camphoratus (Fr.) Fr. (1838)
- Cortinarius campinaranae Singer & I.J.A. Aguiar (1983)
- Cortinarius campoi Speg. (1921)
- Cortinarius canaliculatus Rob. Henry ex Bidaud & Carteret (2008)
- Cortinarius canarius (E. Horak) G. Garnier (1991)
- Cortinarius candelariopsis Rob. Henry (1970)
- Cortinarius candicans (Velen.) Moënne-Locc. & Reumaux (1990)
- Cortinarius candidus Moënne-Locc. & Reumaux (2000)
- Cortinarius candolleanoides Rob. Henry (1970)
- Cortinarius canens Bidaud, Moënne-Locc. & Reumaux (1993)
- Cortinarius canescens Peck (1889)
- Cortinarius caninoides Rob. Henry (1985)
- Cortinarius caninus (Fr.) Fr. (1838)
- Cortinarius canovestitus Soop (2014)
- Cortinarius caperatoides Bidaud & Reumaux (2010)
- Cortinarius caperatus ((Pers.) Fr. (1838) - gypsy mushroom (Europe, North America)
- Cortinarius capillosus Rob. Henry (1981)
- Cortinarius capitellinus E. Horak (1975)
- Cortinarius capraginicolor Moënne-Locc. & Reumaux (2000)
- Cortinarius capsicosmus Gasparini (2007)
- Cortinarius carabus Kytöv., Niskanen & Liimat. (2009)
- Cortinarius carbonipes Bidaud, Carteret & Reumaux (2012)
- Cortinarius carbunculus H. Lindstr. & H. Markl. (2012)
- Cortinarius cardinalis (E. Horak) G. Garnier (2011)
- Cortinarius carneipallidus E. Harrower & E. Horak (2015) – New Zealand
- Cortinarius carneoalbus M.M. Moser (1975)
- Cortinarius carneocrassus M.M. Moser (1975)
- Cortinarius carneolus (E. Horak) Peintner & M.M. Moser (2002)
- Cortinarius carneoroseus (E. Horak) G. Garnier (2011)
- Cortinarius carpinamicus Rob. Henry (1989)
- Cortinarius carranzae Ammirati, Halling & Garnica (2007)
- Cortinarius cartagoensis Ammirati, Liimat., Niskanen, Halling & J. Carranza (2014)
- Cortinarius cartilagineus (G. Cunn.) Peintner & M.M. Moser (2002)
- Cortinarius caryotoides Soop & J.A. Cooper (2018) Aotearoa New Zealand
- Cortinarius cascadensis Ammirati & A.H. Sm. (1978)
- Cortinarius casimirii (Velen.) Huijsman (1955)
- Cortinarius castaneiceps E. Horak (1990)
- Cortinarius castanellus Peck (1878)
- Cortinarius castaneodiscus (E. Horak) G. Garnier (1991)
- Cortinarius castaneoduracinus Chevassut & Rob. Henry (1982)
- Cortinarius castaneofulvus Cleland (1928)
- Cortinarius castaneoides Peck (1872)
- Cortinarius castaneolens Chevassut & Rob. Henry (1982)
- Cortinarius castaneopallens Rob. Henry (1981)
- Cortinarius castaneopallidus Carteret (2004)
- Cortinarius castaneus (Bull.) Fr. (1838)
- Cortinarius catalanensis Ballarà, Mahiques & Garrido-Benavent (2019)
- Cortinarius catalaunicus Melot (1989)
- Cortinarius catarracticus Gasparini (2004) - Australia
- Cortinarius catervatus M.M. Moser (1975)
- Cortinarius catskillensis Peck (1872)
- Cortinarius cauquenensis Garrido (1988)
- Cortinarius cavipes J. Favre (1955)
- Cortinarius cedriodor Bidaud (2010)
- Cortinarius cedriolens M.M. Moser (1967)
- Cortinarius cedriosmus Bidaud (2010)
- Cortinarius centrirufus Kytöv., Niskanen & Liimat. (2014)
- Cortinarius centroguttatus E. Horak (1995)
- Cortinarius cephalixus Secr. ex Fr. (1838)
- Cortinarius cepistipes A. Favre & P.-A. Moreau (2001)
- Cortinarius ceraceus M.M. Moser (1967)
- Cortinarius cereifolius (M.M. Moser) M.M. Moser (1967)
- Cortinarius cervarius (Velen.) G. Garnier (1991)
- Cortinarius cervinicolor Rob. Henry (1981)
- Cortinarius cervinoporphyreus Chevassut & Rob. Henry (1982)
- Cortinarius cesarioanus A.R. Nilsen & Orlovich (2021) – New Zealand
- Cortinarius ceskarum Ammirati, Niskanen & Liimat. (2014)
- Cortinarius chamaeleon Melot (1989)
- Cortinarius chamaesalicis Bon (1985)
- Cortinarius chevassutii Rob. Henry (1982)
- Cortinarius choloides E. Horak (1975)
- Cortinarius chromobasis Høil. & Watling (1990)
- Cortinarius chrysenteron Rob. Henry (1969)
- Cortinarius chrysma Soop (1998) – New Zealand
- Cortinarius chrysochalybdeus Gasparini (2007)
- Cortinarius chrysoconius Soop (2016)
- Cortinarius chrysolitus Kauffman (1915)
- Cortinarius chrysomallus Lamoure (1977)
- Cortinarius chrysophaeus E. Horak (1975)
- Cortinarius chrysophthalmus (M.M. Moser) G. Garnier (1991)
- Cortinarius chrysopocos Gasparini (2007)
- Cortinarius chusqueae M.M. Moser & E. Horak (1975)
- Cortinarius cicindela Kytöv., Niskanen & Liimat. (2009)
- Cortinarius cineraceus Rob. Henry (1985)
- Cortinarius cinereobrunneolus Chevassut & Rob. Henry (1982)
- Cortinarius cinereobrunneus M.M. Moser (1975)
- Cortinarius cinereoolivaceus (Velen.) G. Garnier (1991)
- Cortinarius cinereus Gray (1821)
- Cortinarius cingulatus (Velen.) Rob. Henry (1945)
- Cortinarius cinnabarinus Fr. (1838)
- Cortinarius cinnamofulvus Rob. Henry (1988)
- Cortinarius cinnamomeoides Hongo (1965)
- Cortinarius cinnamomeoluteus P.D. Orton (1960) – edible, but deadly look-alikes (C. gentilis)
- Cortinarius cinnamomeus (L.) Gray (1821) – also known as Dermocybe cinnamomea (Europe, North America), may be edible, but has deadly look-alikes (C. gentilis)
- Cortinarius cinnamophyllus M.M. Moser (1975)
- Cortinarius cinnamostriatulus Rob. Henry (1968)
- Cortinarius cinnamoviolaceus M.M. Moser (1968)
- Cortinarius circinans Rob. Henry (1985)
- Cortinarius cisqhale Bojantchev (2013) – North America
- Cortinarius cistohelvelloides Bon (1992)
- Cortinarius cistophilus Rob. Henry & Contu (1989)
- Cortinarius cistopulchripes Bidaud (2004)
- Cortinarius cistovelatus Vila, A. Ortega & Bidaud (2009)
- Cortinarius citocyaneus Rob. Henry (1983)
- Cortinarius citreisporus Bidaud & Fillion (2000)
- Cortinarius citribasalis Soop (2018) - Aotearoa New Zealand
- Cortinarius citrinellus Kauffman (1923)
- Cortinarius citriniceps Murrill (1946)
- Cortinarius citrinoflavus Bidaud & Moënne-Locc. (2000)
- Cortinarius citrinofulvescens M.M. Moser (2001)
- Cortinarius citrino-olivaceus M.M. Moser (1952)
- Cortinarius citrinophyllus Piane (1956)
- Cortinarius citrinopigmentosus M.M. Moser (1975)
- Cortinarius citrinovirens Rob. Henry (1987)
- Cortinarius clackamasensis Ammirati, Liimat., Niskanen & Dima (2021)
- Cortinarius citrinovirens Rob. Henry (1987)
- Cortinarius clandestinus Kauffman (1932)
- Cortinarius claricolor (Fr.) Fr. (1838) – eaten in Europe, unknown edibility in North America
- Cortinarius clarisordidus Niskanen, Kytov. & Liimat. (2020)
- Cortinarius clarobrunneus (H. Lindstr. & Melot) Niskanen, Kytöv. & Liimat. (2009)
- Cortinarius claroplaniusculus Rob. Henry (1983)
- Cortinarius claroturmalis Rob. Henry (1987)
- Cortinarius claviceps Reumaux (1996)
- Cortinarius clavipes Rob. Henry (1956)
- Cortinarius clelandii A.H. Sm. (1944)
- Cortinarius clintonianus Peck (1873)
- Cortinarius coartatus E. Horak (1975)
- Cortinarius coccineus Reumaux (1994)
- Cortinarius codinae Maire (1937)
- Cortinarius codonius Rob. Henry (1988)
- Cortinarius codonoides Rob. Henry (1983)
- Cortinarius coeruleolutescens Rob. Henry (1984)
- Cortinarius coeruleo-ochrascens Rob. Henry & Chevassut (1975)
- Cortinarius coeruleopallescens Contu (1999)
- Cortinarius coigue Garrido (1988)
- Cortinarius coleoptera H. Lindstr. & Soop (1999)
- Cortinarius collangustus Rob. Henry (1981)
- Cortinarius collariatus E. Horak & M.M. Moser (1975)
- Cortinarius collinitoides Bidaud, Moënne-Locc. & Reumaux (2000)
- Cortinarius collinitoparvus Rob. Henry (1963)
- Cortinarius collinitus (Sowerby) Gray (1821) – belted slimy cort (North America)
- Cortinarius collinus (Velen.) G. Garnier (1991)
- Cortinarius collivagus (Velen.) G. Garnier (1991)
- Cortinarius colombianus (Halling & Ovrebo) Peintner, E. Horak, M.M. Moser & Vilgalys (2002)
- Cortinarius coloratus Peck (1872)
- Cortinarius colorius (Bidaud) Niskanen, Dima & Liimat. (2020)
- Cortinarius colossipes Reumaux (1991)
- Cortinarius colubripes Reumaux (2008)
- Cortinarius colymbadinus Fr. (1838)
- Cortinarius comatus J. Favre (1955)
- Cortinarius compactus (Velen.) G. Garnier (1991)
- Cortinarius compar (Weinm.) Fr. (1838)
- Cortinarius compressus A.H. Sm. (1944)
- Cortinarius comptulus M.M. Moser (1968)
- Cortinarius concolor E. Horak (1975)
- Cortinarius coneae (R. Heim) Peintner & M.M. Moser (2002)
- Cortinarius confirmatus Rob. Henry (1983)
- Cortinarius confusus Kauffman & A.H. Sm. (1933)
- Cortinarius conglobatus Rob. Henry (1952)
- Cortinarius congregatus Bidaud & Armada (2020)
- Cortinarius congruens Herp. (1912)
- Cortinarius conicocampanulatus Rob. Henry (1988)
- Cortinarius conico-obtusarum A. Ortega & Chevassut (1999)
- Cortinarius conicosordescens A. Favre (2007)
- Cortinarius conicoumbonatus Seslı, Liimat. & Demirel (2018)
- Cortinarius conicus (Velen.) Rob. Henry (1942)
- Cortinarius conioides Peintner & M.M. Moser (2002)
- Cortinarius conopileus K.A. Thomas, M.M. Moser, Peintner & Manim. (2003)
- Cortinarius conterminus Bidaud & Carteret (2014)
- Cortinarius contractoides Carteret & Reumaux (2013)
- Cortinarius contractus Rob. Henry (1985)
- Cortinarius contrarius J. Geesink (1976)
- Cortinarius contui Rob. Henry & Contu (1987)
- Cortinarius contulmensis Garrido (1988)
- Cortinarius conveniens (Schulzer) Melot (1989)
- Cortinarius copakensis Peck (1878)
- Cortinarius coracis Kytöv., Niskanen, Liimat. & Dima (2014)
- Cortinarius cordae (Velen.) G. Garnier (1991)
- Cortinarius cordipes Rob. Henry (1986)
- Cortinarius corium-caepicii Melot (1995)
- Cortinarius coronatovelatus Reumaux ex Gane (2013)
- Cortinarius coronatus Bidaud, Moënne-Locc. & Reumaux (1993)
- Cortinarius corpulentus Bojantchev, S.D. Adams, Liimat., & Niskanen (2023)
- Cortinarius corrugatus Peck (1872)
- Cortinarius corsico-amethystinus (Chevassut, Rob. Henry & Tristani) Reumaux (2004)
- Cortinarius cortinatus Rob. Henry (1941)
- Cortinarius coruscans (Fr.) Fr. (1838)
- Cortinarius corvinus Reumaux (2012)
- Cortinarius corynecystis (M.M. Moser) Kuhn.-Fink. & Peintner (2003)
- Cortinarius costaricensis Ammirati, Halling & Garnica (2007)
- Cortinarius cotoneipes Rob. Henry (1988)
- Cortinarius cotoneus Fr. (1838)
- Cortinarius cramesinus (E. Horak) G. Garnier (1991)
- Cortinarius crassifolius (Velen.) Kühner & Romagn. ex Bon (1986)
- Cortinarius crassisporus Kytöv., Niskanen & Liimat. (2014)
- Cortinarius crassoides M.M. Moser (1975)
- Cortinarius crassorum Rob. Henry (1988)
- Cortinarius craticius Fr. (1838)
- Cortinarius cremeoglobosus Rob. Henry (1988)
- Cortinarius cretaceus (E. Horak) E. Horak (1980)
- Cortinarius cribbiae (A.H. Sm.) Gasparini (2014)
- Cortinarius crispus (Velen.) G. Garnier (1991)
- Cortinarius croceicolor Kauffman (1905)
- Cortinarius croceobasalis Kärcher & Seibt (1993)
- Cortinarius croceocingulatus N. Arnold & E. Ludw. (1993)
- Cortinarius croceocristallinus Rob. Henry (1988)
- Cortinarius croceofurfuraceus Rob. Henry (1988)
- Cortinarius croceolamellatus N. Arnold & Schmid-Heckel (1987)
- Cortinarius croceolimbatus (Bon) G. Garnier (1991)
- Cortinarius croceolutescens Rob. Henry ex Bidaud, Moënne-Locc. & Reumaux (2000)
- Cortinarius croceosimilis Liimat., Niskanen & Ammirati (2014)
- Cortinarius croceus (Schaeff.) Gray (1821)
- Cortinarius cruentiphyllus Niskanen, Liimat., Kytöv., Ammirati, Dima, L. Albert & K.W. Hughes (2014)
- Cortinarius cruentoides Soop (2014)
- Cortinarius cruentus Bidaud & Reumaux (1994)
- Cortinarius crustulatus Herp. (1912)
- Cortinarius crustulinicolor (Bon & Gaugué) Bidaud, Moënne-Locc., Reumaux & Rob. Henry (2000)
- Cortinarius crustulinus Malençon (1970)
- Cortinarius cryptus Moënne-Locc. (2000)
- Cortinarius crystallinus Fr. (1838)
- Cortinarius crystallophorus M.M. Moser & E. Horak (1975)
- Cortinarius cucullatus M.M. Moser (1975)
- Cortinarius cucullifer Romagn. (1980)
- Cortinarius cucumeris E. Horak (1990) - New Zealand
- Cortinarius cucumis E. Horak (1975)
- Cortinarius cucumisporus M.M. Moser (1968)
- Cortinarius cumatilis Fr. (1838)
- Cortinarius cunninghamii (E. Horak) Peintner & M.M. Moser (2002)
- Cortinarius cuphocyboides Soop (2014)
- Cortinarius cuphomorphus Soop (2014)
- Cortinarius cuprescens Eyssart. & Bidaud (2003) – France
- Cortinarius curanilahuensis Garrido & E. Horak (1988)
- Cortinarius cuspidatus Singer (1951)
- Cortinarius cuteruptus Rob. Henry (1981)
- Cortinarius cyaneus (Bres.) M.M. Moser (1967)
- Cortinarius cyanites Fr. (1838)
- Cortinarius cyanobasalis Rob. Henry (1986)
- Cortinarius cyanopus Secr. ex Fr. (1838)
- Cortinarius cyanosterix Rob. Henry (1956) – France
- Cortinarius cyanoxanthus Carteret (2012)
- Cortinarius cycneus E. Horak (1990) – New Zealand
- Cortinarius cylindratus Rob. Henry (1983) – France
- Cortinarius cylindripes Kauffman (1905)
- Cortinarius cylindrisporus Murrill (1946) – US (Florida)
- Cortinarius cylindrospermus M.M. Moser (1975) – Argentina
- Cortinarius cypriacoides Bidaud, Carteret & Reumaux (2015)
- Cortinarius cyprinus Bidaud, Carteret & Reumaux (2015)
- Cortinarius cypripedi Soop (2016)
- Cortinarius cystidifer (Velen.) Reumaux (1985)
- Cortinarius cystidiobicolor Liimat. & Niskanen (2017)
- Cortinarius cystidiocatenatus (Grgur.) Gasparini (2006) – Australia
- Cortinarius cystidiophorus Reumaux (1993) – France
- Cortinarius cystidiorapaceus M.M. Moser (1975) – Argentina
- Cortinarius cystidiosus V.P. Sharma & Barh (2019)

== D ==
- Cortinarius dactylichrous M.M. Moser (1975)
- Cortinarius dactylodermus Rob. Henry (1970)
- Cortinarius damascenus Fr. (1838)
- Cortinarius danicus Høil. (1984)
- Cortinarius danili Rob. Henry (1943)
- Cortinarius darwinii Speg. (1887)
- Cortinarius daucodes Peintner & M.M. Moser (2002)
- Cortinarius davemallochii Ammirati, Niskanen & Liimat. (2014)
- Cortinarius davisii Murrill (1942)
- Cortinarius debbieae Trappe & Claridge (2003)
- Cortinarius deceptivissimusReumaux (1984) – France
- Cortinarius deceptivoides Bidaud (2014)
- Cortinarius deceptivus Kauffman (1905)
- Cortinarius decipiens (Pers.) Zawadzki (1835)
- Cortinarius decipientoides Moënne-Locc. & Reumaux – France
- Cortinarius decolorus Herp. (1912)
- Cortinarius decoratus Bataille (1909)
- Cortinarius decurtatus Bataille (1909) – France
- Cortinarius deflexus Murrill (1945)
- Cortinarius deianae Bidaud & Fillion (2007) – France
- Cortinarius delibutus Fr. (1838)
- Cortinarius delicatus Herp. (1912)
- Cortinarius deminutus Peintner (2003)
- Cortinarius denigratoides Ballarà, Mahiques & Garrido-Ben. (2021)
- Cortinarius denigratus Ammirati, Beug, Niskanen, Liimat. & O. Ceska (2016)
- Cortinarius denseconnatus Rob. Henry (1983)
- Cortinarius dentatus (Velen.) G. Garnier (1991)
- Cortinarius depallens (M.M. Moser) Bidaud, Moënne-Locc. & Reumaux (1993)
- Cortinarius depauperatus (J.E. Lange) Soop (1990)
- Cortinarius depexus (Fr.) Fr. (1838)
- Cortinarius depressus Fr. (1838)
- Cortinarius dermagnitus Rob. Henry (1981)
- Cortinarius deroleptus Rob. Henry (1983)
- Cortinarius desertorum (Velen.) G. Garnier (1991)
- Cortinarius detudis Bidaud & Fillion (1992)
- Cortinarius diabolicoides Moënne-Locc. & Reumaux (1992)
- Cortinarius diabolicorigens Bohus (1976)
- Cortinarius diabolicus (Fr.) Fr. (1838)
- Cortinarius diagnitus Rob. Henry (1956)
- Cortinarius diaphorus Soop, A.R. Nilsen & Orlovich (2020) – New Zealand
- Cortinarius diasemospermus Lamoure (1978)
- Cortinarius dibaphoides (E. Horak) Peintner & M.M. Moser (2002)
- Cortinarius dichrous M.M. Moser (1975)
- Cortinarius dicolor Reumaux (2002)
- Cortinarius diemii M.M. Moser (1975)
- Cortinarius diffamatus Carteret (2012)
- Cortinarius difficilis Speg. (1887)
- Cortinarius diffractosuavis Chevassut & Rob. Henry (1978)
- Cortinarius dilutus (Pers.) Fr. (1838)
- Cortinarius diobensis Beeli (1928)
- Cortinarius dionysae Rob. Henry (1933)
- Cortinarius diosmoides Rob. Henry (1989)
- Cortinarius diosmus Kühner (1955)
- Cortinarius dischroipes Rob. Henry (1989)
- Cortinarius discoideus Rob. Henry (1968)
- Cortinarius discophaeus M.M. Moser (1975)
- Cortinarius disjungendulus Kytöv., Liimat. & Niskanen (2014)
- Cortinarius disjungendus P. Karst. (1893)
- Cortinarius dissensio Rob. Henry (1985)
- Cortinarius dissidens Reumaux (1980)
- Cortinarius dissimulans M.M. Moser (1975)
- Cortinarius distortus Kauffman (1932)
- Cortinarius dolabratoides Kytöv., Carteret, Bidaud, Liimat., Niskanen, Bellanger, Dima, Reumaux & Ammirati (2017)
- Cortinarius dolosus Herp. (1912)
- Cortinarius dombeyi (Singer) Peintner & M.M. Moser (2002)
- Cortinarius duboisensis Ammirati, Beug, Niskanen & Liimat. (2016)
- Cortinarius dulciolens E. Horak, M.M. Moser, Peintner & Vilgalys (2002) – New Zealand
- Cortinarius dumetorum J. Favre (1960)
- Cortinarius dunensis A. de Haan, Lenaerts & Volders (2001) – Belgium
- Cortinarius duracinellus Rob. Henry (1970)
- Cortinarius duracinobtusus Rob. Henry (1970)
- Cortinarius duracinus Fr. (1838)
- Cortinarius duramarus Jul. Schäff. (1957)
- Cortinarius duramarus Jul. Schäff. ex Kuhn.-Fink. & Peintner (2003)
- Cortinarius durifoliorum Soop & Dima (2018) - Aotearoa New Zealand
- Cortinarius durissimus M.M. Moser (1952)
- Cortinarius duristipes Kytöv., Niskanen & Liimat. (2014)
- Cortinarius duromarus M.M. Moser (1967)
- Cortinarius dysodes Soop (2001)

== E ==
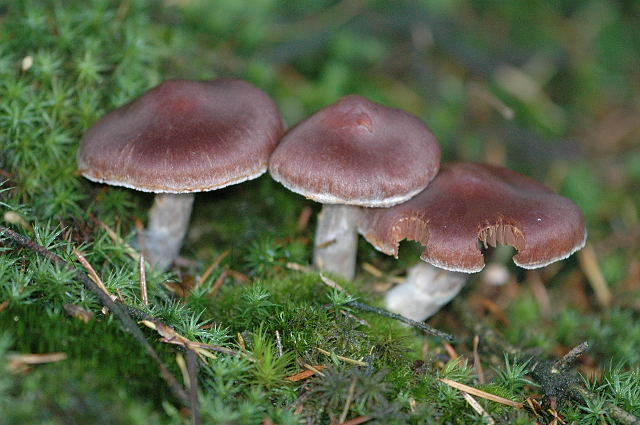
C. evernius (Fr. 1818) Fr. 1838

- Cortinarius earinus Romagn. (1977)
- Cortinarius eartoxicus Gasparini (2004) – Australia (Tasmania)
- Cortinarius ectypus J. Favre (1960)
- Cortinarius egenus E. Horak (1975)
- Cortinarius egmontianus (E. Horak) G. Garnier (1991)
- Cortinarius egonii Salgado Salomón, Peintner, Liimat. & Niskanen (2021)
- Cortinarius egregius Bidaud (2013)
- Cortinarius elacatipus E. Horak, Peintner, M.M. Moser & Vilgalys (2002) – New Zealand
- Cortinarius elachus M.M. Moser (1975)
- Cortinarius elaiochrous E. Horak, M.M. Moser, Peintner & Vilgalys (2002) – New Zealand
- Cortinarius elaiops Soop (2008) – New Zealand
- Cortinarius elaiotus M.M. Moser (1975)
- Cortinarius elaphinicolor Carteret (2004) – France
- Cortinarius elaphinus M.M. Moser (1975)
- Cortinarius elatior Fr. (1838) - Europe
- Cortinarius elatostipitatus Gasparini (2007) – Australia (Tasmania)
- Cortinarius elatus (Rob. Henry) Bidaud (2009)
- Cortinarius eldoradoensis Bojantchev (2013) – North America
- Cortinarius elegans Reumaux (1989)
- Cortinarius elegantoides Kauffman (1918)
- Cortinarius elegantulus (M.M. Moser) M.M. Moser (1967)
- Cortinarius eleonorae Reumaux (2016)
- Cortinarius elytropus Rob. Henry (1955) – France
- Cortinarius emarginatus (Velen.) G. Garnier (1991)
- Cortinarius emilii M. Langl. & Reumaux (2000) – France
- Cortinarius emodensis Berk. (1852)
- Cortinarius emunctus Fr. (1838)
- Cortinarius entheosus Soop (2016)
- Cortinarius epileucus M.M. Moser (1975) – Argentina
- Cortinarius epiphaeus (E. Horak) Peintner & M.M. Moser (2002) – New Zealand
- Cortinarius epipoleus Fr. (1838)
- Cortinarius epipurrus Chevassut & Rob. Henry (1978) – France
- Cortinarius equestriformis Murrill (1946)
- Cortinarius erebius M.M. Moser (1975)
- Cortinarius errabundus Melot (1992)
- Cortinarius erraticus Peck (1889)
- Cortinarius erugatus (Weinm.) Fr. (1838)
- Cortinarius erumpens Rob. Henry (1958)
- Cortinarius erythrinus (Fr.) Fr. (1838)
- Cortinarius erythrocephalus Dennis (1955)
- Cortinarius erythrocitriolens Mahiques & Ballarà (2008)
- Cortinarius erythrofuscus Mahiques & A. Ortega (2002) – Spain
- Cortinarius erythrojonipes (Fayod) Sacc. & D. Sacc. (1905)
- Cortinarius esculentus Lebedeva (1949)
- Cortinarius eucaerulescens Rob. Henry (1989)
- Cortinarius euchrous Rob. Henry (1939)
- Cortinarius eucinnamomeus Rob. Henry (1959)
- Cortinarius eucollybianus Soop, sp. (2018) - Aotearoa New Zealand
- Cortinarius eudilutus Reumaux (2013)
- Cortinarius eufulmineus Rob. Henry (1952)
- Cortinarius eulepistus Bidaud & Moënne-Locc. (1993)
- Cortinarius eunomalus Soop (2018) - Aotearoa New Zealand
- Cortinarius euprasinus Rob. Henry (1989)
- Cortinarius europaeus (M.M. Moser) Bidaud, Moënne-Locc. & Reumaux (1993)
- Cortinarius eustriatulus Rob. Henry (1985)
- Cortinarius evanescens E. Horak (1995) – Papua New Guinea
- Cortinarius everniiformis Rob. Henry (1989)
- Cortinarius evernius (Fr.) Fr. (1838)
- Cortinarius exaltatus E. Horak (1975)
- Cortinarius excruciatus M.M. Moser (1975)
- Cortinarius exiguus (Velen.) G. Garnier (1991)
- Cortinarius exilis E. Horak (1975)
- Cortinarius exitiosus Bidaud, Moënne-Locc. & Reumaux (2001)
- Cortinarius expallens M.M. Moser (1993)
- Cortinarius exsularis Garrido-Ben., Ballarà & Mahiques (2016)
- Cortinarius extractus Eyssart. & Dima (2021)

== F ==
- Cortinarius fagetorum M.M. Moser (1967)
- Cortinarius falsarius (Fr.) Rob. Henry ex Bon (1986)
- Cortinarius falsosus Moënne-Locc. & Reumaux (2001)
- Cortinarius famatus Moënne-Locc. & Reumaux (2001) – France
- Cortinarius fascicularis A.E. Johnson (1878)
- Cortinarius fascicularoides Carteret (2004) – France
- Cortinarius fatuus E. Horak (1975)
- Cortinarius favrexilis Bon (1992)
- Cortinarius fechtneri (Velen.) G. Garnier (1991)
- Cortinarius felleicolor Rob. Henry (1989)
- Cortinarius fennoscandicus Bendiksen, K. Bendiksen & Brandrud (1993)
- Cortinarius feretransitus Chevassut & Rob. Henry (1994)
- Cortinarius ferinsolitus Rob. Henry (1989)
- Cortinarius ferrei Ballarà & Mahiques (2020)
- Cortinarius ferrugineifolius M.M. Moser (1993)
- Cortinarius ferrugineogriseus Peck (1910)
- Cortinarius ferrugineosordescens Rob. Henry (1956)
- Cortinarius ferrugineovelatus Kytöv., Liimat. & Niskanen (2014)
- Cortinarius ferruginosus (A.H. Sm.) Ammirati, Liimat. & Niskanen (2014)
- Cortinarius ferrusinus Ballarà, Mahiques & Garrido-Ben. (2017)
- Cortinarius fervidoides Bidaud, Moënne-Locc. & Reumaux (1994)
- Cortinarius fervidus P.D. Orton (1964)
- Cortinarius fervillei Bidaud, Carteret & Reumaux (2013)
- Cortinarius fibrillosibrunneus Kytov., Niskanen & Liimat. (2020)
- Cortinarius fibroglaucescens Rob. Henry (1966)
- Cortinarius fibulatobtusus Rob. Henry (1968)
- Cortinarius fidelis Bidaud, Moënne-Locc. & Reumaux (1996)
- Cortinarius filamentosus (Velen.) G. Garnier (1991)
- Cortinarius fillionii Bidaud, Moënne-Locc. & Reumaux (1995)
- Cortinarius fimbriatus Murrill (1945)
- Cortinarius finitimus (Weinm.) P. Karst. (1879)
- Cortinarius fiveashianus Grgur. (1997)
- Cortinarius flabelloides Carteret (2010)
- Cortinarius flabellus (Fr.) Fr. (1838)
- Cortinarius flagellostriatus Rob. Henry (1968)
- Cortinarius flammeolus Bidaud (2013)
- Cortinarius flammeouraceus Niskanen, Kytov., Liimat., Ammirati & Dima (2020)
- Cortinarius flammuliformis Murrill (1942)
- Cortinarius flammuloides E. Horak & M.M. Moser (1975)
- Cortinarius flavens Herp. (1912)
- Cortinarius flavescens (Cooke) Rob. Henry (1939)
- Cortinarius flavescentium Rob. Henry (1985)
- Cortinarius flavidolilacinus Bidaud (2006)
- Cortinarius flavidulus Peintner & M.M. Moser (2002) – New Zealand
- Cortinarius flavidus (Velen.) G. Garnier (1991)
- Cortinarius flavifolius Peck (1888)
- Cortinarius flavipes (Velen.) G. Garnier (1991)
- Cortinarius flavoalbus Rob. Henry (1969)
- Cortinarius flavobasilis M.M. Moser & O.K. Mill. ex Peintner, Kuhn.-Fink., C.L. Cripps & Ammirati (2017)
- Cortinarius flavoferrugineus M.M. Moser (1975)
- Cortinarius flavofucatus (E. Horak & M.M. Moser) G. Garnier (1991)
- Cortinarius flavopallidus (M.M. Moser) M.M. Moser (1967)
- Cortinarius flavopurpureus N. Pastor & Nouhra (2019)
- Cortinarius flavornatus Singer (1931)
- Cortinarius flavosquamosus (Velen.) G. Garnier (1991)
- Cortinarius flavotomentosus (M.M. Moser) G. Garnier (1991)
- Cortinarius flavovelus (Grgur.) Peintner & M.M. Moser (2002)
- Cortinarius flavus Reumaux (2000)
- Cortinarius flexibilifolius Carteret (2004)
- Cortinarius flexibilis Rob. Henry (1983)
- Cortinarius flexipes (Pers.) Fr. (1838)
- Cortinarius floccopus Bidaud (1995)
- Cortinarius floridulus Rob. Henry (1993)
- Cortinarius flos-paludis Rob. Henry (1993)
- Cortinarius fluorescens E. Horak (1975)
- Cortinarius fluryi (M.M. Moser) M.M. Moser (1967)
- Cortinarius foetens (M.M. Moser) M.M. Moser (1967)
- Cortinarius foetenticolor Rob. Henry (1989)
- Cortinarius foligemmatus Chevassut & Rob. Henry (1982)
- Cortinarius fonsii Melot (1995)
- Cortinarius formosus M.M. Moser (1975)
- Cortinarius fragilipes Cleland (1933)
- Cortinarius fragilis (Zeller & C.W. Dodge) Peintner & M.M. Moser (2002)
- Cortinarius fragilistipitatus Reumaux (2005)
- Cortinarius fragrantior Gaugué (1977)
- Cortinarius fragrantissimus Ammirati, Beug, Liimat., Niskanen & O. Ceska (2016)
- Cortinarius francescae Reumaux (1992)
- Cortinarius franchii Soop (2014)
- Cortinarius fraternus (Lasch) Reumaux (1990)
- Cortinarius fraudulosoconnatus Rob. Henry (1989)
- Cortinarius fulgens Fr. (1838)
- Cortinarius fulgentissimus Reumaux (2003)
- Cortinarius fulgidus Reumaux & Ramm (2003)
- Cortinarius fulgoalbus Rob. Henry (1952)
- Cortinarius fulgorubeolus Chevassut & Rob. Henry (1994)
- Cortinarius fuligineoviolaceus E. Horak (1975)
- Cortinarius fuligineus Joachim (1944)
- Cortinarius fulminans Moënne-Locc. & Reumaux (2008)
- Cortinarius fulminatus Reumaux (2003)
- Cortinarius fulmineus Fr. (1838)
- Cortinarius fulminoides (M.M. Moser) M.M. Moser (1967)
- Cortinarius fulvaster Rob. Henry (1969)
- Cortinarius fulvaurantius Rob. Henry (1989)
- Cortinarius fulvaureus Rob. Henry (1944)
- Cortinarius fulvescens Fr. (1838)
- Cortinarius fulvescentoideus Kytöv., Niskanen & Liimat. (2016)
- Cortinarius fulvoconicus M.M. Moser (1975)
- Cortinarius fulvoisabellinus Rob. Henry (1941)
- Cortinarius fulvoiubatus Gasparini (2007)
- Cortinarius fulvoleoninus Rob. Henry (1989)
- Cortinarius fulvonitens Moënne-Locc. & Reumaux (2013)
- Cortinarius fulvo-olivaceus Rob. Henry (1952)
- Cortinarius fulvopaludosus Kytöv., Niskanen & Liimat. (2017)
- Cortinarius fulvoraphanoides Rob. Henry (1959)
- Cortinarius fulvorimosus Carteret & Reumaux (2008)
- Cortinarius fulvorufus Reumaux (2013)
- Cortinarius fulvosquamosus P.D. Orton (1977)
- Cortinarius fulvostriatulus Rob. Henry (1968)
- Cortinarius fulvus Rob. Henry (1957)
- Cortinarius furfurellus Peck (1880)
- Cortinarius furiosus Carteret & Reumaux (2015)
- Cortinarius furnaceus M.M. Moser (1975)
- Cortinarius furtimornatus Rob. Henry (1970)
- Cortinarius furvolaesus H. Lindstr. (1998)
- Cortinarius furvoumbrinus Liimat., Niskanen & Kytöv. (2014)
- Cortinarius furvus Liimat., Niskanen & Kytöv. (2014)
- Cortinarius fuscescens Kytöv., Niskanen & Liimat. (2014)
- Cortinarius fuscidulopallens Rob. Henry (1981)
- Cortinarius fuscoalbus Kytöv., Niskanen & Liimat. (2017)
- Cortinarius fuscobovinaster Kytöv., Liimat., Niskanen & H. Lindstr. (2013) – Europe
- Cortinarius fuscobovinus Kytöv., Niskanen & Liimat. (2013) – Europe
- Cortinarius fuscodiscus A.H. Sm. (1944)
- Cortinarius fuscoflavidus Niskanen, Liimat., Bojantchev & Ammirati (2021)
- Cortinarius fuscoflexipes M.M. Moser & McKnight (1987)
- Cortinarius fuscogracilescens A. Favre (2009)
- Cortinarius fuscoides Reumaux (2013)
- Cortinarius fuscomaculatus Jul. Schäff. (1947)
- Cortinarius fusco-olivaceus (Weinm.) Moënne-Locc. & Reumaux (1990)
- Cortinarius fuscosericeus Reumaux (2012)
- Cortinarius fuscotinctus Rea (1917)
- Cortinarius fuscotomentosus Bojantchev, Liimat. & Niskanen (2021)
- Cortinarius fuscoumbonatus Gasparini (2006) – Australia
- Cortinarius fuscoumbrinus Liimat., Niskanen & Kytöv. (2014)
- Cortinarius fuscovelatus Kytöv., Niskanen & Liimat. (2014)
- Cortinarius fuscoviolaceus Peck (1875)
- Cortinarius fuscoviridis E. Horak (1995)
- Cortinarius fuscus M.M. Moser (1975)
- Cortinarius fusiclavus E. Horak (1995)
- Cortinarius fusipes (P. Karst.) Bidaud, Moënne-Locc. & Reumaux (1997)
- Cortinarius fusisporus Kühner (1955) – France

== G ==
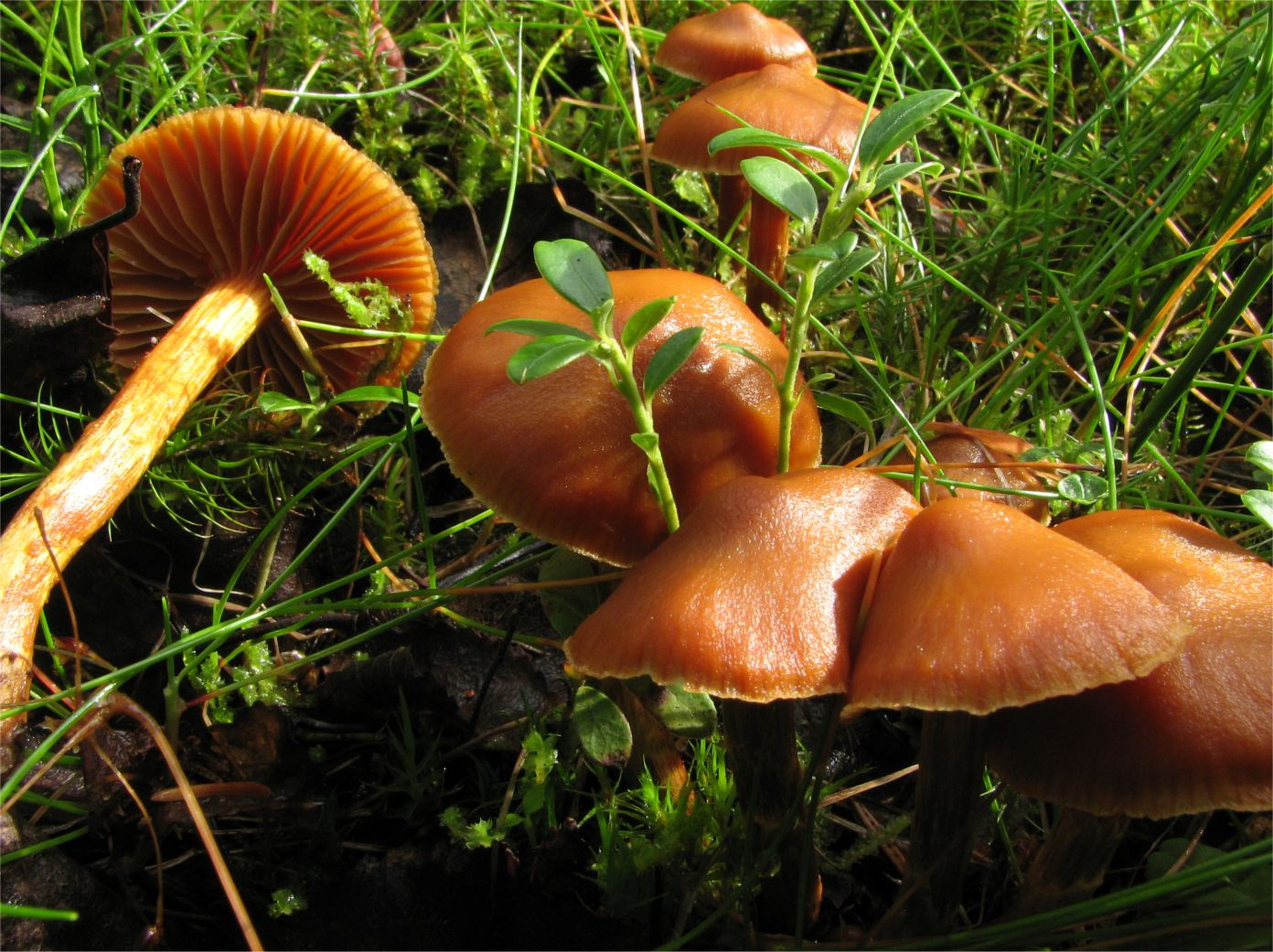
C. gentilis (Fr. 1821) Fr. 1838

- Cortinarius gaiacofuscus Rob. Henry (1995) – France
- Cortinarius galbus Kuhar & Nouhra (2021)
- Cortinarius galeacampanulatus Rob. Henry (1989) – France
- Cortinarius galeraeformis (Velen.) G. Garnier (1991)
- Cortinarius galeriniformis Singer & I.J.A. Aguiar (1983) – Brazil
- Cortinarius galerinoides Lamoure (1977) – France
- Cortinarius galeroides Hongo (1965)
- Cortinarius gallairei Rob. Henry (1982) – France
- Cortinarius gallurae D. Antonini, M. Antonini & Consiglio (2005) – Italy
- Cortinarius gallurensis Contu (1999) – Italy
- Cortinarius gamundiae (E. Horak) E. Horak, Peintner, M.M. Moser & Vilgalys (2002) – Argentina
- Cortinarius garciae Garrido-Ben., Ballarà & Mahiques (2016)
- Cortinarius gaudiosus E. Horak (1980) – Argentina
- Cortinarius gausapatus J. Favre (1955) – Switzerland
- Cortinarius gayi E. Horak (1980) – Argentina
- Cortinarius gemmeus E. Horak (1990) – New Zealand
- Cortinarius geniculatus Bidaud (2014)
- Cortinarius gentilis (Fr.) Fr. (1838)
- Cortinarius gentilissimus – US
- Cortinarius geophilus – France
- Cortinarius gentilissimus A.H. Sm. (1939)
- Cortinarius geophilus Rob. Henry (1985)
- Cortinarius geosmus M.M. Moser (1975)
- Cortinarius geraniolens Bidaud (2010)
- Cortinarius giacomoi Bidaud, Moënne-Locc. & Reumaux (2000)
- Cortinarius gigasporus Singer (1938)
- Cortinarius glabrellus Kauffman (1907)
- Cortinarius glabriceps Peintner (2003)
- Cortinarius glandicolor (Fr.) Fr. (1838)
- Cortinarius glaphurus Chevassut & Rob. Henry (1982)
- Cortinarius glaucoprasinus (M.M. Moser) M.M. Moser (1967)
- Cortinarius glaucovestitus Bidaud & Reumaux (2008)
- Cortinarius gliocyclus E. Horak (1975)
- Cortinarius globisporus (Velen.) Rob. Henry ex Bon (1986)
- Cortinarius globovosporus (Chevassut & Rob. Henry) G. Garnier (1991)
- Cortinarius globuliformis Bougher (1986)
- Cortinarius gloiodes Kuhar, Nouhra & M.E. Sm. (2021)
- Cortinarius glutinopallens (E. Horak) Peintner & M.M. Moser (2002)
- Cortinarius glutinosoarmillatus Bojantchev, Ammirati, Liimat. & Niskanen (2017)
- Cortinarius glutinosus Peck (1890)
- Cortinarius gnirre Garrido & M.M. Moser (1988)
- Cortinarius gossypinus H. Lindstr. (2012)
- Cortinarius gracilentus Salgado Salomón & Peintner (2021)
- Cortinarius gracilior (Jul. Schäff. ex M.M. Moser) M.M. Moser (1967)
- Cortinarius gracilipes M.M. Moser (1975)
- Cortinarius gracilis (Peck) Sacc. (1891)
- Cortinarius graminicola Sathe & S.D. Deshp. (1981)
- Cortinarius granadensis Armada & Bellanger (2020)
- Cortinarius grandisporus (Chevassut & Rob. Henry) Bidaud (2010)
- Cortinarius granovarius Chevassut & Rob. Henry (1978)
- Cortinarius grantalius Grgur. (1997)
- Cortinarius graveolens (Velen.) G. Garnier (1991)
- Cortinarius gravis Melot (1995)
- Cortinarius gregis Rob. Henry (1952)
- Cortinarius grinlingii M.M. Moser (1960)
- Cortinarius griseocarneus Carteret (2010)
- Cortinarius griseocephalus (Bidaud & Reumaux) A. Favre (2018)
- Cortinarius griseoflammeus Carteret (2004)
- Cortinarius griseofuscescens Rob. Henry (1961)
- Cortinarius griseolavandulus Reumaux (1980)
- Cortinarius griseoluridus Kauffman (1923)
- Cortinarius griseus Peck (1888)
- Cortinarius grosmorneensis Liimat. & Niskanen (2012)
- Cortinarius gualalaensis Bojantchev (2013) – North America
- Cortinarius gueneri E. Sesli (2021)
- Cortinarius guttatus Rob. Henry (1952)
- Cortinarius gymnocephalus – New Zealand

== H ==
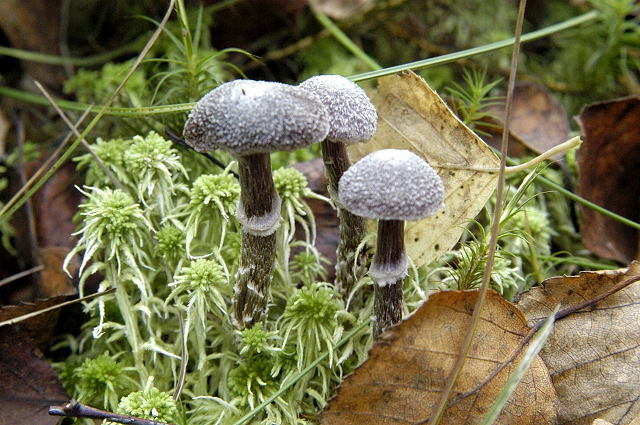
C. hemitrichus (Pers. 1801) Fr. 1838

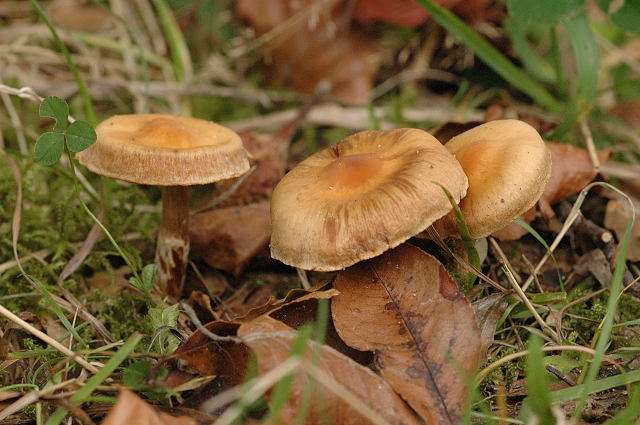
C. hinnuleus (Sow. 1799) Fr. 1838

- Cortinarius habros Bojantchev, Dima, Liimat., Niskanen & L. Albert (2022)
- Cortinarius hadrocroceus Ammirati, Niskanen, Liimat. & Bojantchev (2014)
- Cortinarius haematocheloides Chevassut & Rob. Henry (1982)
- Cortinarius hallingii Ammirati, Niskanen, Liimat. & Garnica (2021)
- Cortinarius hallowellensis A.E. Wood (2009) – Western Australia and Tasmania
- Cortinarius haematocheloides Chevassut & Rob. Henry (1982) – France
- Cortinarius harrisii Grgur. (2002) – Australia
- Cortinarius harrisonii Ammirati, Niskanen & Liimat. (2013) – US
- Cortinarius harvardensis L. Nagy, Dima & Ammirati (2021)
- Cortinarius heatherae Overall (2020) – UK
- Cortinarius hebelomoides Murrill (1946) – US
- Cortinarius hebes E. Horak (1975)
- Cortinarius hedrychii (Velen.) G. Garnier (1991)
- Cortinarius helianthemorum Bidaud & Cheype (2014)
- Cortinarius heliotropicus Peck (1905)
- Cortinarius helobius Peck (1905) – France
- Cortinarius helodes M.M. Moser, Matheny & Daniele (2001) – US (Wyoming)
- Cortinarius helvelloides (Fr.) Fr. (1838)
- Cortinarius helviodor Rob. Henry (1985) – France
- Cortinarius helvolus (Fr.) Fr. (1838)
- Cortinarius hemitrichoides Bidaud & Moënne-Locc. (2010)
- Cortinarius hemitrichus (Pers.) Fr. (1838)
- Cortinarius henricii Reumaux (1980) – France
- Cortinarius henryanus Bon (1986) – France
- Cortinarius hepaticus Kytov., Niskanen & Liimat. (2020)
- Cortinarius herbarum Rob. Henry (1952) – France
- Cortinarius herculeolens Bidaud (1996) – France
- Cortinarius herculoides Bertault (1983) – Mauritania
- Cortinarius hercynicus (Pers.) M.M. Moser (1967)
- Cortinarius hesleri Ammirati, Niskanen, Liimat. & Matheny (2013) – eastern North America
- Cortinarius heterochromus M.M. Moser ex G. Garnier (1991) – Argentina
- Cortinarius heterocycloideus Kytöv., Niskanen & Liimat. (2017)
- Cortinarius heterocyclus Soop (1990) – Sweden
- Cortinarius heterodepressus Kytöv., Niskanen & Liimat. (2017)
- Cortinarius heterosporus Bres. (1889)
- Cortinarius hiemalis Murrill (1939) – France
- Cortinarius hillieri Rob. Henry (1938) – France
- Cortinarius hinnuleoarmillatus Reumaux (1989) – France
- Cortinarius hinnuleocanadensis Liimat. & Niskanen (2021)
- Cortinarius hinnuleocervinus Niskanen, Liimat. & Ammirati (2017)
- Cortinarius hinnuleolus Romagn. (1977) – France
- Cortinarius hinnuleus Fr. (1838)
- Cortinarius hinnuloides Rob. Henry (1941)
- Cortinarius hircinoides Reumaux (2002)
- Cortinarius hircinosmus Reumaux (2002) – France
- Cortinarius hirtipes Moënne-Locc. & Reumaux (2005)
- Cortinarius hirtus (Velen.) G. Garnier (1991)
- Cortinarius hispanicus Ballarà, Mahiques & Garrido-Ben. (2021)
- Cortinarius hoeftii (Weinm.) Fr. (1838)
- Cortinarius holojanthinus Peintner & M.M. Moser (2002) – Argentina
- Cortinarius holovioleipes Rob. Henry (1989) – France
- Cortinarius holoxanthus (M.M. Moser & I. Gruber) Nezdojm. (1980)
- Cortinarius homomorphus Kühner (1989) – France
- Cortinarius hoplites Melot (1995) – Iceland
- Cortinarius horakii E. Valenz. & Esteve-Rav. (1994) – Los Lagos
- Cortinarius hualo Garrido (1988) – Chile
- Cortinarius huddartensis Bojantchev, Liimat., Niskanen, Ammirati & Dima (2021)
- Cortinarius hughesiae Ammirati, Matheny, Liimat. & Niskanen (2021)
- Cortinarius hujusmodi Rob. Henry (1983) – France
- Cortinarius humboldtensis Ammirati & A.H. Sm. (1977) – edible, but deadly look-alikes (C. gentilis)
- Cortinarius humicola (Quél.) Maire (1912)
- Cortinarius humidorufus Cleric., Boccardo & Dovana (2023)
- Cortinarius humilior Rob. Henry (1956) – France
- Cortinarius humilis M.M. Moser (1975) – Argentina
- Cortinarius hybospermus M.M. Moser (1975)
- Cortinarius hydrocephalus (Weinm.) Fr. (1838)
- Cortinarius hydrotelamonioides Rob. Henry (1985)
- Cortinarius hygrophanus (Velen.) G. Garnier (1991)
- Cortinarius hygrophilus Bidaud, Fillion & Moënne-Locc. (2000)
- Cortinarius hygrophoraccedens Rob. Henry (1984)
- Cortinarius hygrophoroides Speg. (1887)
- Cortinarius hymenoluctus Rob. Henry (1995)
- Cortinarius hysginus (M.M. Moser) M.M. Moser (1967)

== I ==
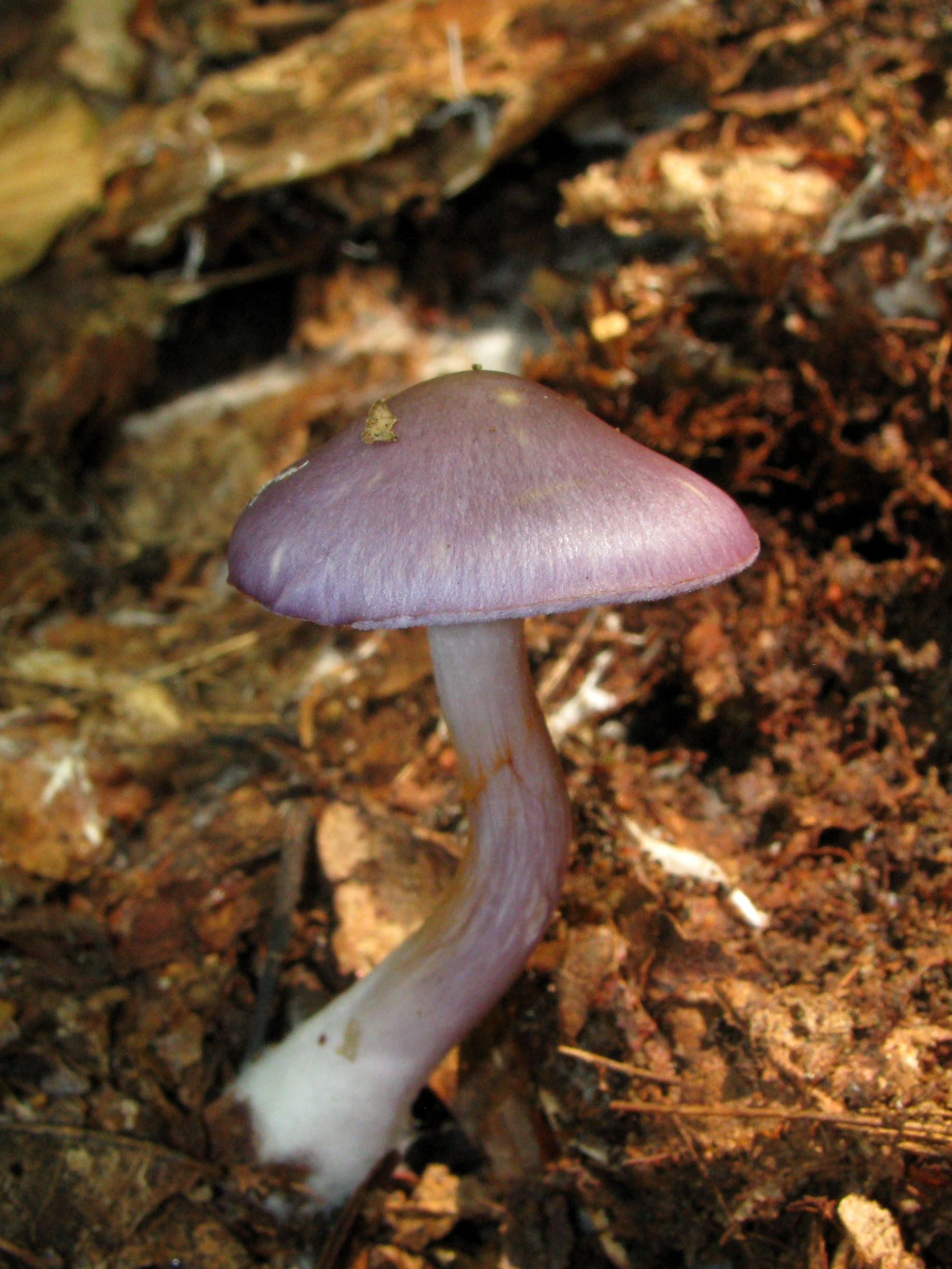
C. iodes Berk. & M.A.Curtis 1853

- Cortinarius iaganicus (Speg.) E. Horak (1975)
- Cortinarius ianthinus Cleland & J.R. Harris (1948)
- Cortinarius ianuarius Franchi & M. Marchetti (2006)
- Cortinarius icterinoides (E. Horak) G. Garnier (1991)
- Cortinarius icterinus (E. Horak) G. Moreno & E. Valenz. (1997)
- Cortinarius idahoensis Ammirati & A.H. Sm. (1978)
- Cortinarius ignellus Soop (2003)
- Cortinarius ignifluus Bidaud (1994)
- Cortinarius ignotus E. Horak (1990)
- Cortinarius ilexarbutus Rob. Henry (1986)
- Cortinarius iliceti Armada (2021)
- Cortinarius iliopodius (Bull.) Fr. (1838)
- Cortinarius illibatus Fr. (1838)
- Cortinarius illitus M.M. Moser & E. Horak (1975)
- Cortinarius illuminoides Bidaud (2013)
- Cortinarius illuminus Fr. (1838)
- Cortinarius illustris Herp. (1912)
- Cortinarius imbecillis M.M. Moser (1975)
- Cortinarius imbutoides Bidaud & Carteret (2014)
- Cortinarius imbutus Fr. (1838)
- Cortinarius immissus Schläpf.-Bernh. (1951)
- Cortinarius immixtus Kauffman (1932)
- Cortinarius impennis Fr. (1838)
- Cortinarius imperialis Bidaud (1993)
- Cortinarius impolitus Kauffman (1918)
- Cortinarius inaequalis (Weinm.) Reumaux (2013)
- Cortinarius inamoenus (J. Favre) Quadr. (1985)
- Cortinarius incarnatofocalis Rob. Henry (1989)
- Cortinarius incensus Soop (2003)
- Cortinarius incisior Bidaud, Moënne-Locc. & Reumaux (1997)
- Cortinarius incisus (Pers.) Fr. (1838)
- Cortinarius incognitus Ammirati & A.H. Sm. (1972)
- Cortinarius inconspicuus J. Favre (1955)
- Cortinarius indicus Rawla (1991)
- Cortinarius indigoverus E. Horak (1990) - New Guinea
- Cortinarius indolicus E. Horak (1990) - New Zealand
- Cortinarius indopurpurascens Dima, Semwal, Brandrud, V. Papp & V.K. Bhatt (2020)
- Cortinarius indorusseus Dima, Semwal, V.K. Bhatt & Brandrud (2020)
- Cortinarius indotatus (E. Horak) G. Garnier (1991)
- Cortinarius iners (Bidaud) Liimat., Dima & Niskanen (2020)
- Cortinarius infernalis Armada & Carteret (2011)
- Cortinarius infestans Moënne-Locc. (2002)
- Cortinarius inflatipes M.M. Moser (1975)
- Cortinarius inflatobulbus (Rob. Henry) Rob. Henry (1992)
- Cortinarius inflatus (Velen.) G. Garnier (1991)
- Cortinarius infractiflavus Kytöv., Niskanen, Liimat., Bojantchev & Ammirati (2014) – Wyoming, Europe
- Cortinarius infractimor Chevassut & Rob. Henry (1975)
- Cortinarius infractus (Pers.) Fr. (1838)
- Cortinarius infrastemmatus Chevassut & Rob. Henry (1988)
- Cortinarius infrequens N. Pastor & Nouhra (2019)
- Cortinarius ingratiolens Gasparini (2007)
- Cortinarius inhonestus (Weinm.) Moënne-Locc. & Reumaux (1991)
- Cortinarius inochlorus Maire (1937)
- Cortinarius inocybiphyllus M.M. Moser (1975)
- Cortinarius inocyboides (Velen.) G. Garnier (1991)
- Cortinarius inodorus (Velen.) G. Garnier (1991)
- Cortinarius inops J. Favre (1955)
- Cortinarius insignolens (Rob. Henry) Rob. Henry (1989)
- Cortinarius integerrimus Kühner (1989) – France
- Cortinarius intempestivus Moënne-Locc. & Reumaux (2001) – France
- Cortinarius interlectus E. Horak (1980)
- Cortinarius intermedius Rea (1927)
- Cortinarius iodeoides Kauffman (1918)
- Cortinarius iodes
- Cortinarius ionipus E. Horak (1975)
- Cortinarius ionodactylus Knutsson & Soop (2005)
- Cortinarius ionomataius Soop (2005)
- Cortinarius ionophyllus M.M. Moser (1968)
- Cortinarius iris Massee (1893)
- Cortinarius isabellinus (Batsch) Fr. (1838)
- Cortinarius iunii Ballarà, E. Suárez, Mahiques & Garrido-Ben. (2017)

== J ==
- Cortinarius jacobi-langei Bidaud (2008)
- Cortinarius janthinocaulis Peintner & M.M. Moser (2002)
- Cortinarius janthinophaeus E. Horak & M.M. Moser (1975)
- Cortinarius jenolanensis A.E. Wood (2009)
- Cortinarius jiaoheensis T. Bau & Ying Luo (2021)
- Cortinarius jimenezianus Armada & J.D. Reyes (2021)
- Cortinarius joannae Rob. Henry (1957)
- Cortinarius jonimitchelliae H. Lindström, Dima, Kytövuori, Liimatainen & Niskanen - Sweden, Estonia, Italy. Named after musician Joni Mitchell.
- Cortinarius josserandii Bidaud (1994) – France
- Cortinarius jucundus Melot (1989)
- Cortinarius juglandaceus Soop (2018) = Aotearoa New Zealand
- Cortinarius junghuhnii Fr. (1838)
- Cortinarius juranus Reumaux (1993)

== K ==
- Cortinarius kaputarensis Danks, T. Lebel & Vernes (2010)
- Cortinarius kashmirensis Watling (1980)
- Cortinarius kauffmanianus A.H. Sm. (1933)
- Cortinarius kauffmanii Bidaud, Moënne-Locc. & Reumaux (1994)
- Cortinarius keralensis K.A. Thomas, M.M. Moser, Peintner & Manim. (2003)
- Cortinarius kerrii Singer & I.J.A. Aguiar (1983) - Brazil
- Cortinarius khinganensis M.L. Xie, T.Z. Wei & Y. Li (2021)
- Cortinarius kiambramensis Grgur. (1997)
- Cortinarius killermannii Bidaud (2000)
- Cortinarius kilpanius Grgur. (1997)
- Cortinarius kioloensis A.E. Wood (2009) - New Zealand and Australia
- Cortinarius kivaczensis Singer (1949)
- Cortinarius koldingensis Frøslev & T.S. Jeppesen (2015)
- Cortinarius kompsos Eyssart., Trimaille & Dima (2021)
- Cortinarius konradianus Bidaud, Moënne-Locc. & Reumaux (2000)
- Cortinarius korfii T.Z. Wei & Y.J. Yao (2013)
- Cortinarius kranabetteri Niskanen, Liimat., Harrower, Ammirati & Dima (2021)
- Cortinarius krombholzii Fr. (1874)
- Cortinarius kunicensis Moënne-Locc. (2001)

== L ==
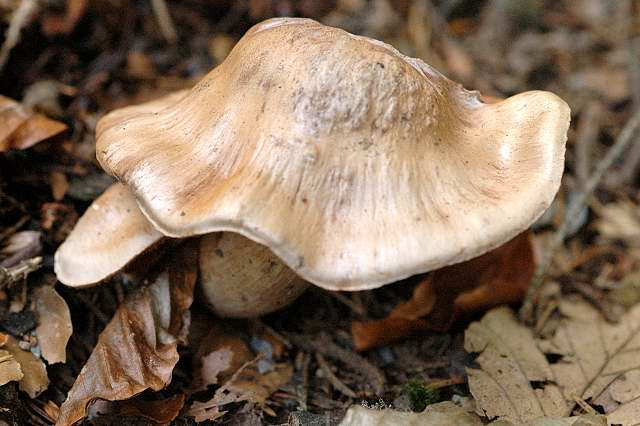
C. livido-ochraceus (Berk. 1836) Berk. 1860

- Cortinarius laccarioides Miyauchi (2001)
- Cortinarius laccariphyllus Y. Li & M.L. Xie (2020)
- Cortinarius laccatus Reumaux (1982)
- Cortinarius lacertianus E. Horak (1995)
- Cortinarius lachanus Soop (2016)
- Cortinarius lacteus Gasparini (2007)
- Cortinarius lacticeps Murrill (1945)
- Cortinarius lacus Rob. Henry (1981)
- Cortinarius lacustris Moënne-Locc. & Reumaux (1997)
- Cortinarius laetabilis Herp. (1912)
- Cortinarius laetargutus Chevassut & Rob. Henry (1978)
- Cortinarius laetelamellatus Gasparini (2008) – Australia
- Cortinarius laeticolor Murrill (1952)
- Cortinarius laetifolius E. Horak (1975)
- Cortinarius laetissimus Rob. Henry (1957)
- Cortinarius laetus M.M. Moser (1968)
- Cortinarius laevisporus (Velen.) G. Garnier (1991)
- Cortinarius lajeannei Rob. Henry (1986)
- Cortinarius lamoureae Bon (1986)
- Cortinarius lamprocreas Chevassut & Rob. Henry (1982)
- Cortinarius lamproxanthus Soop (2005)
- Cortinarius lanatipes Peck (1889)
- Cortinarius lanceocystis Moënne-Locc. & Reumaux (2003)
- Cortinarius lanceolatus M. Wallace (2018) - Aotearoa New Zealand
- Cortinarius laniger Fr. (1838)
- Cortinarius lapidophilus Peck (1878)
- Cortinarius largiformis Murrill (1944)
- Cortinarius largofulgens (E. Horak) G. Garnier (1991)
- Cortinarius largus Fr. (1838)
- Cortinarius lasiospermus M.M. Moser (1968)
- Cortinarius lateritiofocalis Rob. Henry (1989)
- Cortinarius lateritius Bidaud, Hermitte & Poumarat (2014)
- Cortinarius latifolius M.M. Moser (1975)
- Cortinarius latiodistributus Dima, Ammirati, Niskanen, Kytöv., Liimat. & Brandrud (2021)
- Cortinarius latobalteatus (Jul. Schäff.) M.M. Moser (1967)
- Cortinarius latomellitus Rob. Henry (1986)
- Cortinarius latus (Pers.) Fr. (1838)
- Cortinarius lavandulocaeruleus Cleland & J.R. Harris (1948)
- Cortinarius lazoi M.M. Moser (1975)
- Cortinarius lazulinus E. Horak & M.M. Moser (1975)
- Cortinarius lebre Garrido (1988)
- Cortinarius lebretonii Quél. (1880)
- Cortinarius leguminosus (Velen.) G. Garnier (1991)
- Cortinarius leiocastaneus Niskanen, Liimat. & Soop (2008)
- Cortinarius leochrous Jul. Schäff. (1949)
- Cortinarius leoninus (Velen.) G. Garnier (1991)
- Cortinarius leproleptopus Chevassut & Rob. Henry (1988)
- Cortinarius leptocephalus Rob. Henry (1939)
- Cortinarius leptocystis M.M. Moser (1975)
- Cortinarius leptosporus Reumaux (1985)
- Cortinarius leubae Rob. Henry (1995)
- Cortinarius leucanthemium Gasparini (2008) – Australia
- Cortinarius leucocephalus (Massee) Peintner & M.M. Moser (2002)
- Cortinarius leucoloma M.M. Moser (1975)
- Cortinarius leucophaeatus Rob. Henry (1985)
- Cortinarius leucoscobinaceus Ballarà, Mahiques & Garrido-Ben. (2021)
- Cortinarius levipileus J. Favre (1955)
- Cortinarius levisporus (Massee & Rodway ex Rodway) Peintner & M.M. Moser (2002)
- Cortinarius lewisii O.K. Mill. (1993)
- Cortinarius lignarius Peck (1873)
- Cortinarius lignicola Bidaud (1994)
- Cortinarius lignipes Carteret & Reumaux (2013)
- Cortinarius lignyotus E. Horak (1975)
- Cortinarius lilaceus (Schwalb) Para (2020)
- Cortinarius lilacinicolor Reumaux (1996)
- Cortinarius lilacinoarmillatus Semwal & Dima (2019)
- Cortinarius lilacinobrunnescens Bidaud & Boisselet (2011)
- Cortinarius lilacinoclavatus Rob. Henry (1977)
- Cortinarius lilacinocolossus M.M. Moser (2000)
- Cortinarius lilacinofulvus Cleland (1933)
- Cortinarius lilacinopes Britzelm. (1895)
- Cortinarius lilacinus Peck (1873)
- Cortinarius limbatus M.M. Moser (1975)
- Cortinarius limonioides M.M. Moser (1975)
- Cortinarius lindstroemii Niskanen, Kytov. & Liimat. (2020)
- Cortinarius lividomalvaceus Eyssart., Trendel, L. Albert & Dima (2017)
- Cortinarius livido-ochraceus (Berk.) Berk. (1860)
- Cortinarius lividopallidus Rob. Henry (1985)
- Cortinarius lividoviolaceus (Rob. Henry ex M.M. Moser) M.M. Moser (1967)
- Cortinarius lividus M.M. Moser (1975)
- Cortinarius livor Fr. (1838)
- Cortinarius liyui M.L. Xie, R.Q. Ji & T.Z. Wei (2023)
- Cortinarius llimonae Vila (2002)
- Cortinarius lobatus Bidaud & Armada (2014)
- Cortinarius longicaudus M.M. Moser (1975)
- Cortinarius longipes Peck (1873)
- Cortinarius longisporus (Murrill) Singer (1951)
- Cortinarius longistipitatus Saba, Jabeen, Khalid & Dima (2017)
- Cortinarius loringii Ammirati, Liimat. & Niskanen (2021)
- Cortinarius lubricanescens Soop (2001)
- Cortinarius lubricus Poirier & Reumaux (2000)
- Cortinarius lucandii Bidaud, Carteret & Reumaux (2014)
- Cortinarius luci Rob. Henry (1940)
- Cortinarius lucorum (Fr.) E. Berger (1846)
- Cortinarius ludibriosus Carteret (2000)
- Cortinarius ludificabilis Moënne-Locc. & Reumaux (1996)
- Cortinarius lugubris M.M. Moser (1975)
- Cortinarius lundellii (M.M. Moser) M.M. Moser (1967)
- Cortinarius luridus Rob. Henry (1969)
- Cortinarius luteifolius M.M. Moser & E. Horak (1975)
- Cortinarius luteinus Soop (2003)
- Cortinarius luteirufescens (Bougher) Peintner & M.M. Moser (2002)
- Cortinarius luteoalbus (Longyear) Singer (1939)
- Cortinarius luteoallutus Rob. Henry ex Bidaud & Reumaux (2006)
- Cortinarius luteobrunneus Peintner & M.M. Moser (2002)
- Cortinarius luteocarnosus (Raithelh.) Peintner & M.M. Moser (2002)
- Cortinarius luteocoeruleus M.M. Moser (1975)
- Cortinarius luteogracilis Rob. Henry (1969)
- Cortinarius luteolilacinus Chevassut & Rob. Henry (1975)
- Cortinarius luteomelleus M.M. Moser (1975)
- Cortinarius luteoornatus (M.M. Moser) Bidaud, Moënne-Locc. & Reumaux (1995)
- Cortinarius luteoperonatus Bidaud & Cheype (1997)
- Cortinarius luteopulveratus (Rob. Henry) Carteret & Reumaux (2010)
- Cortinarius luteorufus Chevassut & Rob. Henry (1978)
- Cortinarius luteostriatulus (M.M. Moser & E. Horak) G. Garnier (1991)
- Cortinarius luteovelatus Reumaux (2002)
- Cortinarius lutescens Peck (1889)
- Cortinarius lutulentus Jul. Schäff. (1947)
- Cortinarius lux-nymphae Melot (1989)
- Cortinarius luxuriatus Britzelm. (1885)
- Cortinarius lychnuchus Rob. Henry (1996)

== M ==
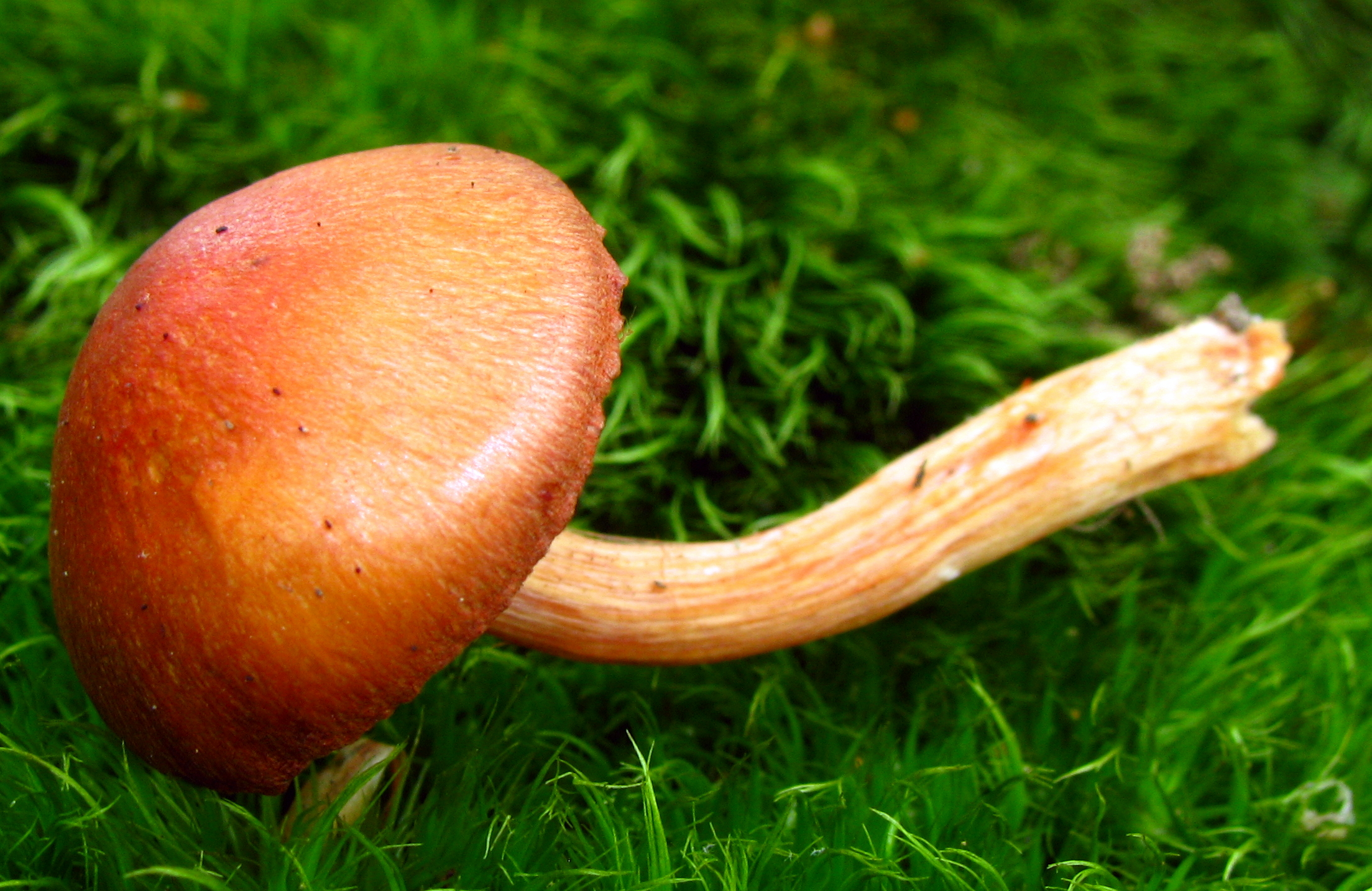
C. marylandensis (Ammirati 1995) Ammirati, Niskanen & Liimat. 2013

- Cortinarius lychnuchus Rob. Henry (1996)
- Cortinarius macilentosporus M.M. Moser (1968)
- Cortinarius macilentus M.M. Moser (1975)
- Cortinarius macrosporus (Velen.) G. Garnier (1991)
- Cortinarius maculatocaespitosus Bidaud (2009)
- Cortinarius maculatus A.E. Johnson (1878)
- Cortinarius maculobulga Danks, T. Lebel & Vernes (2010)
- Cortinarius madidus Gasparini (2007)
- Cortinarius magaliae Rob. Henry (1996)
- Cortinarius magellanicoalbus Salgado Salomón & Peintner (2018)
- Cortinarius magellanicus Speg. (1887) – South America, New Zealand
- Cortinarius maginensis J.D. Reyes & A. Mateos (2021)
- Cortinarius magispilomeus Liimat. & Niskanen (2021)
- Cortinarius magisporus Bidaud (2004)
- Cortinarius magnae-silvae Consiglio (2000)
- Cortinarius magnivelatus Dearn. ex Fogel (1995)
- Cortinarius magnusii Melot (1992)
- Cortinarius mairei M.M. Moser (1967)
- Cortinarius majestaticus (E. Horak) T.P. Anderson & Orlovich (2016)
- Cortinarius major (Velen.) G. Garnier (1991)
- Cortinarius majorinus Moënne-Locc. (2000)
- Cortinarius majusculus Kühner (1955)
- Cortinarius malachius (Fr.) Fr. (1838)
- Cortinarius malenconii Bidaud, Moënne-Locc. & Reumaux (1993)
- Cortinarius malicorius Fr. (1838) – also known as Dermocybe malicoria (North America)
- Cortinarius mallaensis Kytov., Niskanen & Liimat. (2020)
- Cortinarius malleatus Bidaud & Fillion (1998)
- Cortinarius malodorus Y. Lamoureux, Lebeuf, A. Paul & J. Landry (2021)
- Cortinarius malosinae Soop (2008) – New Zealand
- Cortinarius malvaceopileatus Bidaud & Raffini (2011)
- Cortinarius mammillatus Kałucka, Kytöv., Niskanen & Liimat. (2021)
- Cortinarius mammosus Kauffman (1918)
- Cortinarius manifestus Rob. Henry (1981)
- Cortinarius marcellae Rob. Henry (1983)
- Cortinarius margaritisporus M.M. Moser (1975)
- Cortinarius marginato-ochrascens Rob. Henry (1988)
- Cortinarius marginatosplendens Reumaux (1980)
- Cortinarius mariandrus Liimat. & Niskanen (2022)
- Cortinarius marmoratus E. Horak (1990)
- Cortinarius marylandensis (Ammirati) Ammirati, Niskanen & Liimat. (2013) – North America
- Cortinarius mascardiensis San-Fabian, Niskanen & Liimat. (2018)
- Cortinarius masseei Bidaud, Moënne-Locc. & Reumaux (1993)
- Cortinarius mastoideus Fillion & Moënne-Locc. (2004) – Australia
- Cortinarius matae Ammirati, Halling, Liimat. & Niskanen (2021)
- Cortinarius mattiae Soop (2010)
- Cortinarius maulensis M.M. Moser (1975)
- Cortinarius mavens Herp. (1912)
- Cortinarius maxistriatulus Rob. Henry (1968)
- Cortinarius medius Rob. Henry (1993)
- Cortinarius megacystidiosus Reumaux (2012)
- Cortinarius megalochondrus Rob. Henry (1985)
- Cortinarius megasporus Singer (1949)
- Cortinarius melanoleucus Bidaud & Fillion (2010)
- Cortinarius meleagris (E. Horak & G.M. Taylor) E. Horak, Peintner, M.M. Moser & Vilgalys (2002) (previously Rozites meleagris) – New Zealand
- Cortinarius meletlac Polman-Short, Jem. Barret, Orlovich & T. Lebel (2025) – Australia, New Zealand
- Cortinarius melimyxa E. Horak (1990)
- Cortinarius melitus (Velen.) Moënne-Locc. & Reumaux (1990)
- Cortinarius melizeus E. Horak (1975)
- Cortinarius melleifolius Britzelm. (1892)
- Cortinarius melleipes (Murrill) Singer (1951)
- Cortinarius melleoalbus Liimat., Niskanen & Ammirati (2022)
- Cortinarius melleomitis M.M. Moser & E. Horak (1975)
- Cortinarius melleopallens (Fr.) Britzelm. (1892)
- Cortinarius melleopallentium Rob. Henry (1981)
- Cortinarius melleus M.M. Moser & E. Horak (1975)
- Cortinarius memoriae (Rob. Henry) Rob. Henry (1992)
- Cortinarius mendicus M.M. Moser (1975)
- Cortinarius meridionalis Bidaud, Moënne-Locc. & Reumaux (1993)
- Cortinarius meridonalis Bidaud, Moënne-Locc. & Reumaux (1993)
- Cortinarius mesophaeus M.M. Moser (1975)
- Cortinarius metallicus (Bougher, Fuhrer & E. Horak) Peintner, E. Horak, M.M. Moser & Vilgalys (2002) (previously Rozites metallica) Australia
- Cortinarius metapolychrous M.M. Moser (1968)
- Cortinarius methecticus Rob. Henry (1983)
- Cortinarius metrodii Rob. Henry (1985)
- Cortinarius mexicanus Murrill (1912)
- Cortinarius micaceus M.M. Moser (1975)
- Cortinarius michiganensis Kauffman (1907)
- Cortinarius microarcheri Cleland (1933) - Australia
- Cortinarius microglobisporus Peintner, Bellù & E. Borghi (2014)
- Cortinarius microsemen Bidaud, Carteret & Reumaux ex Carteret & Frund (2013)
- Cortinarius microsporus (Velen.) G. Garnier (1991)
- Cortinarius millaresensis Ballarà, Mahiques & Garrido-Ben. (2016)
- Cortinarius milliaris (Velen.) G. Garnier (1991)
- Cortinarius miltinophyllus Reumaux (2010)
- Cortinarius milvinicolor Moënne-Locc. & Reumaux (1997)
- Cortinarius mimicus Carteret (2004)
- Cortinarius miniatopus J.E. Lange (1940)
- Cortinarius minicaninus Rob. Henry (1993)
- Cortinarius minicolor Rob. Henry (1989)
- Cortinarius minilacus Soop, J.A. Cooper & Dima (2018) - Aotearoa New Zealand
- Cortinarius minimus (Velen.) G. Garnier (1991)
- Cortinarius miniobtusus Rob. Henry (1968)
- Cortinarius minorisporus X. Yue Wang & J.A. Cooper (2020) – New Zealand
- Cortinarius minoscaurus Soop (2001)
- Cortinarius minusculus Liimat. & Niskanen (2019)
- Cortinarius minutalis Lamoure (1977)
- Cortinarius minutulus J. Favre (1955)
- Cortinarius mirabilis (Velen.) G. Garnier (1991)
- Cortinarius miraculosus Melot (1980)
- Cortinarius mirandus Moënne-Locc. & Reumaux (1994)
- Cortinarius mirificus Reumaux (2000)
- Cortinarius mirus Bidaud & Eyssart. (2003)
- Cortinarius miser M.M. Moser (1967)
- Cortinarius mitis M.M. Moser (1975)
- Cortinarius mitratus Herp. (1912)
- Cortinarius miwok Bojantchev (2013) – North America
- Cortinarius modestus Peck (1874)
- Cortinarius montebelloensis Niskanen & Liimat. (2014)
- Cortinarius montensis Bidaud (2001)
- Cortinarius monticola Rob. Henry (1989)
- Cortinarius montis-albi (Velen.) G. Garnier (1991)
- Cortinarius montis-dei Reumaux (1980)
- Cortinarius morenensis San-Fabian, Niskanen & Liimat. (2018)
- Cortinarius morlaisianus Rob. Henry (1970)
- Cortinarius morrisii Peck (1905) - North America
- Cortinarius moserianus Bohus (1970) –Europe
- Cortinarius mtaoensis C. Sharp (2020)
- Cortinarius mucicola A.H. Sm. (1944)
- Cortinarius mucifluoides Rob. Henry ex Bidaud, Moënne-Locc. & Reumaux (2000)
- Cortinarius mucifluus Fr. (1838)
- Cortinarius mucosoamarissimus Rob. Henry (1957)
- Cortinarius mucosus (Bull.) J. Kickx f. (1867)
- Cortinarius mucronatus Rob. Henry (1986)
- Cortinarius mukuvusiensis C. Sharp & B. Dima (2020)
- Cortinarius multicolor M.M. Moser (1967)
- Cortinarius multiformium Consiglio & Moënne-Locc. (2004)
- Cortinarius multisquamulosus (Velen.) G. Garnier (1991)
- Cortinarius multivagus Britzelm. (1891)
- Cortinarius mululeus E.H.L. Krause (1928)
- Cortinarius muricinoides Reumaux & Moënne-Locc. (1989)
- Cortinarius muricinus Fr. (1838)
- Cortinarius murinascens Kytöv., Niskanen & Liimat. (2014)
- Cortinarius muscicola Liimat., Danhao Wang, D. Savage & Niskanen (2022)
- Cortinarius musciphilus Bidaud & P.-A. Moreau (2016)
- Cortinarius musisporus (Bougher & Castellano) Gasparini (2014)
- Cortinarius mussooriensis Rawla (1991)
- Cortinarius mustella (M.M. Moser) Peintner & M.M. Moser (2002)
- Cortinarius mustellinus E. Horak & M.M. Moser (1975)
- Cortinarius mutans Bidaud, Moënne-Locc. & Reumaux (1993)
- Cortinarius muxoproteus Rob. Henry (1992)
- Cortinarius mycenarum Soop (2016)
- Cortinarius mysoides Soop (2016)
- Cortinarius myxacioides M.M. Moser (1975)
- Cortinarius myxo-anomalus Kühner (1989)
- Cortinarius myxoazureus Rob. Henry (1992)
- Cortinarius myxoduracinus E. Horak (1975)
- Cortinarius myxothece E. Horak (1975)

== N ==
- Cortinarius nahuelbutensis (Garrido & E. Horak) G. Garnier (1991)
- Cortinarius nahuelhuapensis N. Pastor & Nouhra (2019)
- Cortinarius nanceiensis Maire (1912)
- Cortinarius nanus Melot (1989)
- Cortinarius naphthalinus Soop (2001)
- Cortinarius napivelatus (E. Horak) Peintner & M.M. Moser (2002)
- Cortinarius napivolvata E. Horak (1980)
- Cortinarius nasutus (Velen.) G. Garnier (1991)
- Cortinarius natrocognitus Rob. Henry (1995)
- Cortinarius naucinus M.M. Moser (1975)
- Cortinarius nauseosouraceus Niskanen, Liimat. & Ammirati (2013)
- Cortinarius navisporus Rob. Henry (1990)
- Cortinarius nebularis Moënne-Locc. & Reumaux (1990)
- Cortinarius necessarius E. Horak (1990)
- Cortinarius nefastus Carteret & Reumaux (2015)
- Cortinarius neglectus Carteret (2013)
- Cortinarius neoarmillatus Hongo (1969)
- Cortinarius neocaledonicus E. Horak (1990)
- Cortinarius neocolus Reumaux & Sasia (2011)
- Cortinarius neofallax Carteret & Reumaux (2004)
- Cortinarius neofurvolaesus Kytöv., Niskanen, Liimat. & H. Lindstr. (2005)
- Cortinarius neosanguineus Ammirati, Liimat. & Niskanen (2013) – North America
- Cortinarius neotorvus Y. Li, M.L. Xie & T.Z. Wei (2020)
- Cortinarius neotropicus E. Harrower (2015) – Costa Rica to Columbia
- Cortinarius nettieae Ammirati, C.L. Cripps, Liimat., Niskanen & Dima (2021)
- Cortinarius neuquensis Salgado Salomón, Peintner, Liimat. & Niskanen (2021)
- Cortinarius nigrellus Peck (1873)
- Cortinarius nigrescens (Reumaux) Reumaux (2000)
- Cortinarius nigricans (Velen.) Singer (1937)
- Cortinarius nigriculus Bidaud & Reumaux (1994)
- Cortinarius nigrocuspidatus Kauffman (1923)
- Cortinarius nigromammosus Reumaux (2004)
- Cortinarius nigro-obtusus Moënne-Locc. (2004)
- Cortinarius nigro-olidus Chevassut & Rob. Henry (1982)
- Cortinarius nigrosquamosus Hongo (1969)
- Cortinarius nijerrus Gasparini (2007)
- Cortinarius niphophilus (Trappe & Claridge) Gasparini (2014)
- Cortinarius nitellinus M.M. Moser (1975)
- Cortinarius nitens P. Karst. (1893)
- Cortinarius nivalis (E. Horak) Peintner & M.M. Moser (2002)
- Cortinarius niveoglobosus H. Lindstr. (1992)
- Cortinarius niveostipitatus Svrček (1996)
- Cortinarius niveotraganus Kytöv., Niskanen & Liimat. (2014)
- Cortinarius nodosisporus Kytöv., Niskanen & Liimat. (2014)
- Cortinarius nolaneiformis (Velen.) G. Garnier (1991)
- Cortinarius norvegicus Høil. (1984)
- Cortinarius nothoanomalus M.M. Moser & E. Horak (1975)
- Cortinarius nothocollinitus M.M. Moser (1975)
- Cortinarius nothodamascenus M.M. Moser (1975)
- Cortinarius nothoduracinus Carteret (2012)
- Cortinarius nothofagi (E. Horak) E. Horak (1980)
- Cortinarius nothosaniosus M.M. Moser (1966)
- Cortinarius nothovenetus (M.M. Moser) G. Garnier (1991)
- Cortinarius novae-zelandiae (D.A. Reid) J.A. Cooper (2023)
- Cortinarius nucicolor Liimat., Niskanen & Kytöv. (2014)
- Cortinarius nudipes Earle (1902)
- Cortinarius nummoides Rob. Henry (1989)
- Cortinarius nymphatus Kytöv., Niskanen, Liimat. & Bojantchev (2016)

== O ==
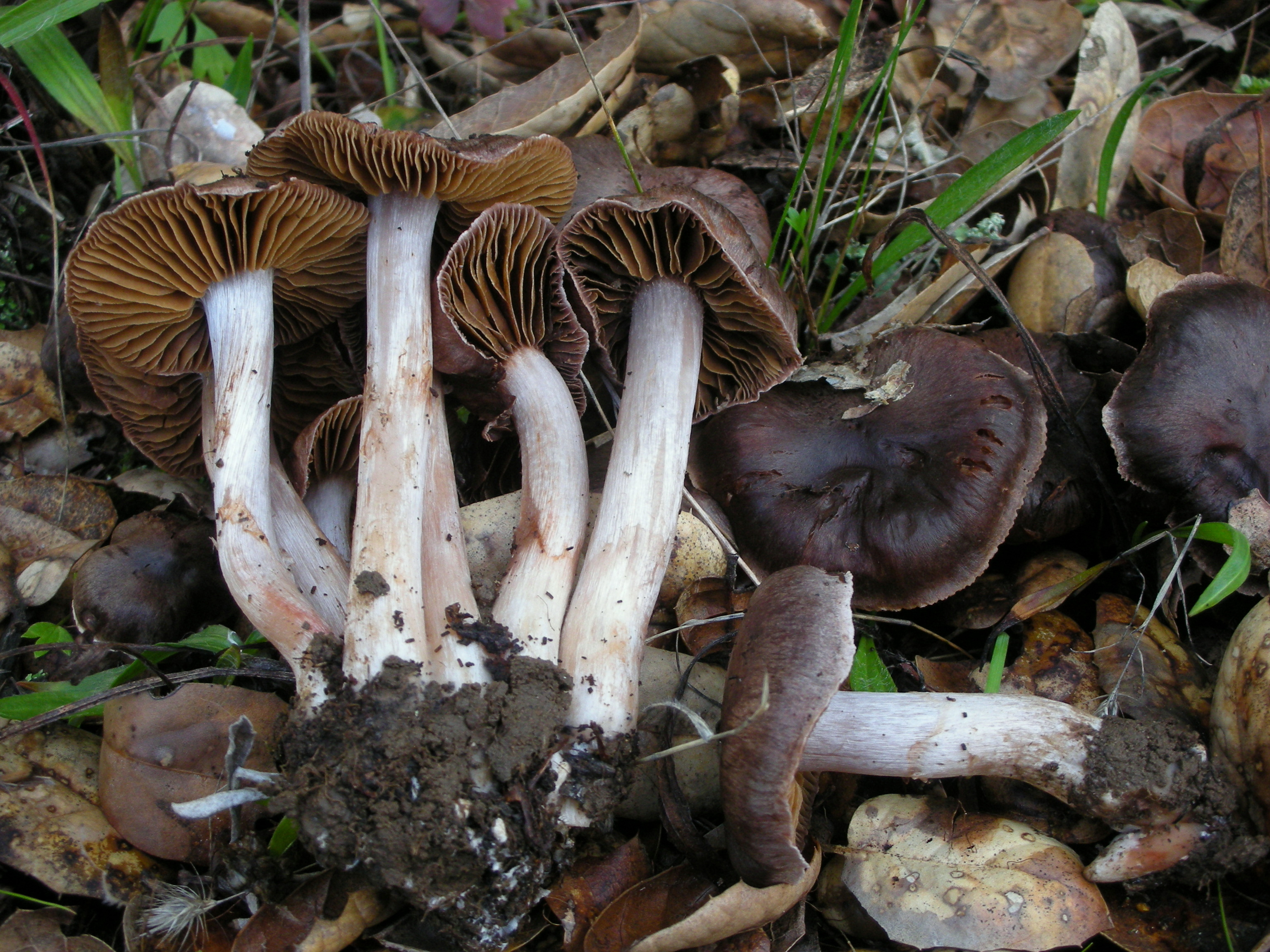
C. ohlone Bojantchev 2013

- Cortinarius obesisporus Moënne-Locc. & Ramm (2000)
- Cortinarius obesus E. Horak (1975)
- Cortinarius obliquus Peck (1902)
- Cortinarius oblongisporus (G.W. Beaton, Pegler & T.W.K. Young) Gasparini (2014), (= Quadrispora oblongispora)
- Cortinarius obrusseus E. Horak (1975)
- Cortinarius obscurefoliatus Rob. Henry (1985)
- Cortinarius obscurissimo-amarus E. Ludw. & M. Huth (2017)
- Cortinarius obscuroarmeniacus M.M. Moser (1975)
- Cortinarius obscurocyaneus Secr. ex J. Schröt. (1889), (= Cortinarius infractus)
- Cortinarius obscuro-oliveus (M.M. Moser) G. Garnier (1991)
- Cortinarius obscurus M.M. Moser (1975)
- Cortinarius obtectus Peintner, E. Horak, M.M. Moser & Vilgalys (2002)
- Cortinarius obtusobadius Bidaud & Carteret (2003)
- Cortinarius obtusobrunneus Rob. Henry (1968)
- Cortinarius obtusocrenatus Rob. Henry (2003)
- Cortinarius obtusoduracinoides Rob. Henry (1968)
- Cortinarius obtusorum Rob. Henry (1968)
- Cortinarius obtusotinctus Rob. Henry (1968)
- Cortinarius obtusus (Fr.) Fr. (1838)
- Cortinarius obvius E. Horak (1980)
- Cortinarius occentus E. Horak (1980)
- Cortinarius occidentalisagacitas Liimat., Niskanen, Kytov. & Ammirati (2020)
- Cortinarius ocellatus M.M. Moser & E. Horak (1975)
- Cortinarius ochraceoazureus (E. Horak) Peintner & M.M. Moser (2002)
- Cortinarius ochraceocinctus M.M. Moser (1975)
- Cortinarius ochraceocoeruleus M.M. Moser (1975)
- Cortinarius ochraceodiscus D.J. McLaughlin & Ammirati (2021)
- Cortinarius ochraceofulvus Cleland (1933)
- Cortinarius ochraceolamellatus M.M. Moser (1975)
- Cortinarius ochraceoleoninus (Velen.) G. Garnier (1991)
- Cortinarius ochraceo-olivascens Rob. Henry ex Bidaud, Moënne-Locc. & Reumaux (2000)
- Cortinarius ochraceovestitus Bidaud (2012)
- Cortinarius ochreatus (Velen.) G. Garnier (1991)
- Cortinarius ochrofulvescens Rob. Henry (1970)
- Cortinarius ochroglutinosus Liimat. & Niskanen (2021)
- Cortinarius ochrojanthinus E. Horak & M.M. Moser (1975)
- Cortinarius ochrolamellatus Ballara, Liimat., Brandrud & Mahiques (2020)
- Cortinarius ochroleucoides Bidaud, Moënne-Locc. & Reumaux (2000)
- Cortinarius ochroluridus M.M. Moser (2001)
- Cortinarius ochropallens Liimat., Niskanen & Ammirati (2013)
- Cortinarius ochroruber Rob. Henry (1957)
- Cortinarius odhinnii Melot (1989)
- Cortinarius odoritraganus Niskanen, Liimat. & Ammirati (2020)
- Cortinarius ohauensis (Soop) Peintner & M.M. Moser (2002)
- Cortinarius ohlone Bojantchev (2013) – California
- Cortinarius oleaginus Cleland & J.R. Harris (1948)
- Cortinarius olens Gasparini (2014)
- Cortinarius oleosus Gasparini (2014)
- Cortinarius olfactorius Bidaud (2000)
- Cortinarius olididisjungendus Liimat., Niskanen, Dima & Kytöv. (2014)
- Cortinarius olidolens Rob. Henry (1986)
- Cortinarius olivaceobubalinus (M.M. Moser) G. Garnier (1991)
- Cortinarius olivaceodes Kauffman (1907)
- Cortinarius olivaceofulvus Kauffman & A.H. Sm. (1933)
- Cortinarius olivaceofumosus E. Horak (1995)
- Cortinarius olivaceofuscus Kühner (1955)
- Cortinarius olivaceoluteus Ammirati, Bojantchev, K.W. Hughes, Liimat. & Niskanen (2014)
- Cortinarius olivaceoniger (E. Horak) G. Garnier (1991)
- Cortinarius olivaceopictus Ammirati & A.H. Sm. (1977) – edible, but deadly look-alikes (C. gentilis)
- Cortinarius olivaceosquamosus Niskanen, A. Paul, Lebeuf, Y. Lamoureux, J. Landry, Matheny & Liimat. (2021)
- Cortinarius olivaceostramineus Kauffman (1905)
- Cortinarius olivascens (Batsch) Fr. (1838)
- Cortinarius olivascentium Rob. Henry (1952)
- Cortinarius olivellostriatus M.M. Moser (1975)
- Cortinarius olivellus Rob. Henry (1952)
- Cortinarius oliveoicterinus (M.M. Moser) G. Garnier (1991)
- Cortinarius olivipes (M.M. Moser) G. Garnier (1991)
- Cortinarius olorinum (E. Horak) Peintner & M.M. Moser (2002)
- Cortinarius olsoniae N. Siegel, S.D. Adams & Bojantchev (2023)
- Cortinarius ombrophilus M.M. Moser (1975)
- Cortinarius ominosus Bidaud (1994)
- Cortinarius omissus Bidaud, Moënne-Locc. & Reumaux (1994)
- Cortinarius omphalosmus Rob. Henry (1981)
- Cortinarius opaculus Soop (2013)
- Cortinarius opertaneus Reumaux (2001)
- Cortinarius ophiopoides Moënne-Locc. (2003)
- Cortinarius ophryx Soop (2013)
- Cortinarius opizii (Velen.) G. Garnier (1991)
- Cortinarius opulentus M.M. Moser (1975)
- Cortinarius orasericeus Rob. Henry (1983)
- Cortinarius orastriatus Rob. Henry (1981)
- Cortinarius oreades Murrill (1945)
- Cortinarius oreinus (Rob. Henry) Eyssart. (2008)
- Cortinarius orellanosus Ammirati & Matheny (2010)
- Cortinarius orellanus Fr. (1838) – Europe, North America
- Cortinarius oreobius J. Favre (1955)
- Cortinarius oreoborealis Cadiñanos, M.M. Gómez & Ballarà (2016)
- Cortinarius oreomunneae Corrales, Ovrebo, Ammirati, Liimat. & Niskanen (2021)
- Cortinarius orichalceolens Rob. Henry (1986)
- Cortinarius orichalceus (Batsch) Fr. (1838)
- Cortinarius orixanthus Soop (2008) – New Zealand
- Cortinarius ornatus (Velen.) G. Garnier (1991)
- Cortinarius orphinus Peintner & M.M. Moser (2002)
- Cortinarius ortegae Mahiques, Ballarà, Salom, Bellanger & Garrido-Ben. (2018)
- Cortinarius ortonii Moënne-Locc. & Reumaux (1992)
- Cortinarius ortovernus Ballarà & Mahiques (2009)
- Cortinarius osfulgentis Rob. Henry (1992)
- Cortinarius osmetus Rob. Henry (1977)
- Cortinarius ostrovecensis Svrček (1996)
- Cortinarius ostruophilus Rob. Henry (1989)
- Cortinarius oulankaensis Kytöv., Niskanen, Liimat. & H. Lindstr. (2013) – Europe
- Cortinarius ovargutus Chevassut & Rob. Henry (1978)
- Cortinarius ovatosporus Rob. Henry (1968)
- Cortinarius ovatosporus Rob. Henry (2003)
- Cortinarius ovreboi Ammirati, Halling & Garnica (2007), (= Thaxterogaster ovreboi)
- Cortinarius oxycephalus Rob. Henry (1970)
- Cortinarius oxytoneus Rob. Henry (1981)

== P ==
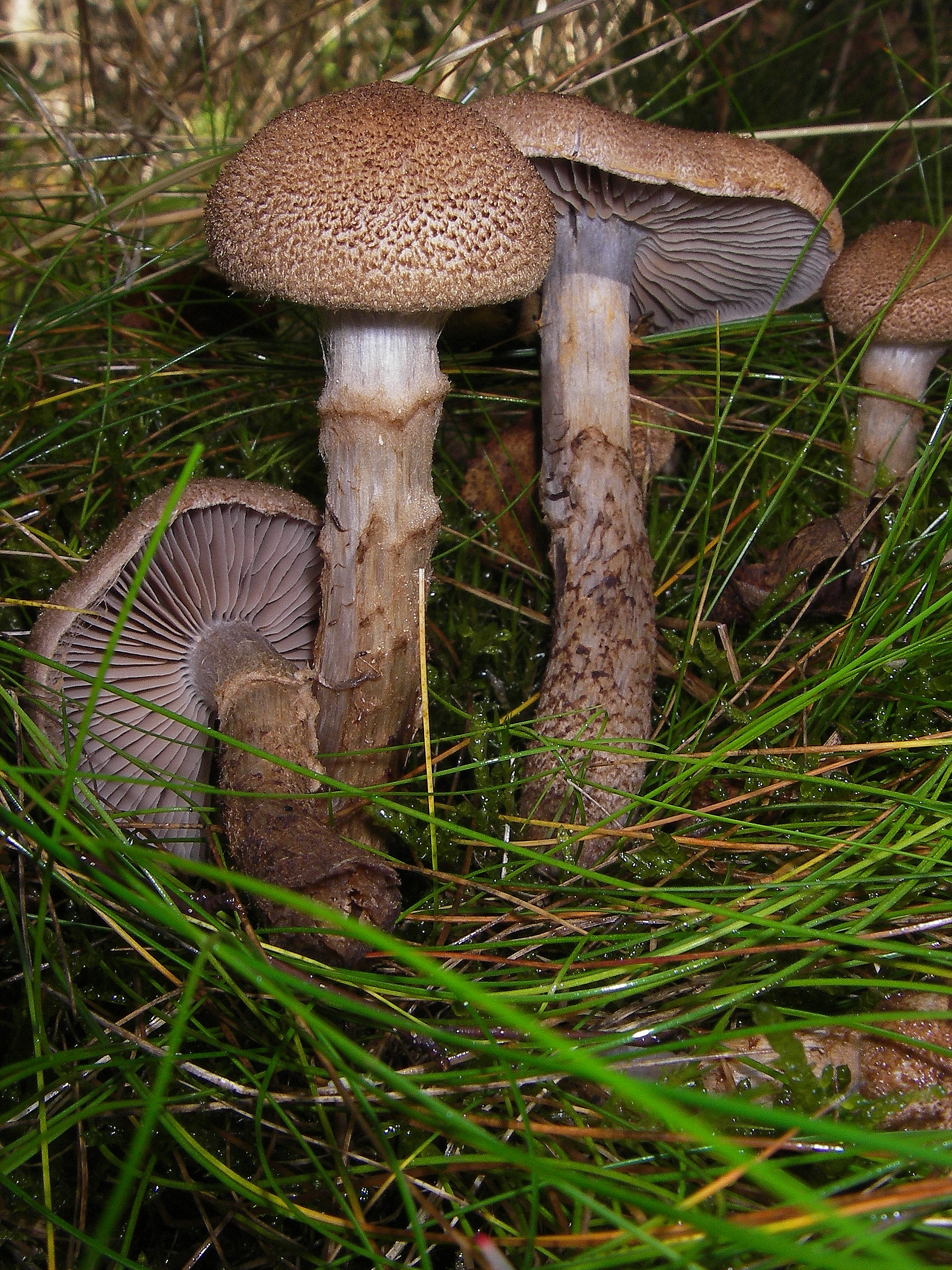
C. pholideus (Lilj./Fr. 1816) Fr. 1838

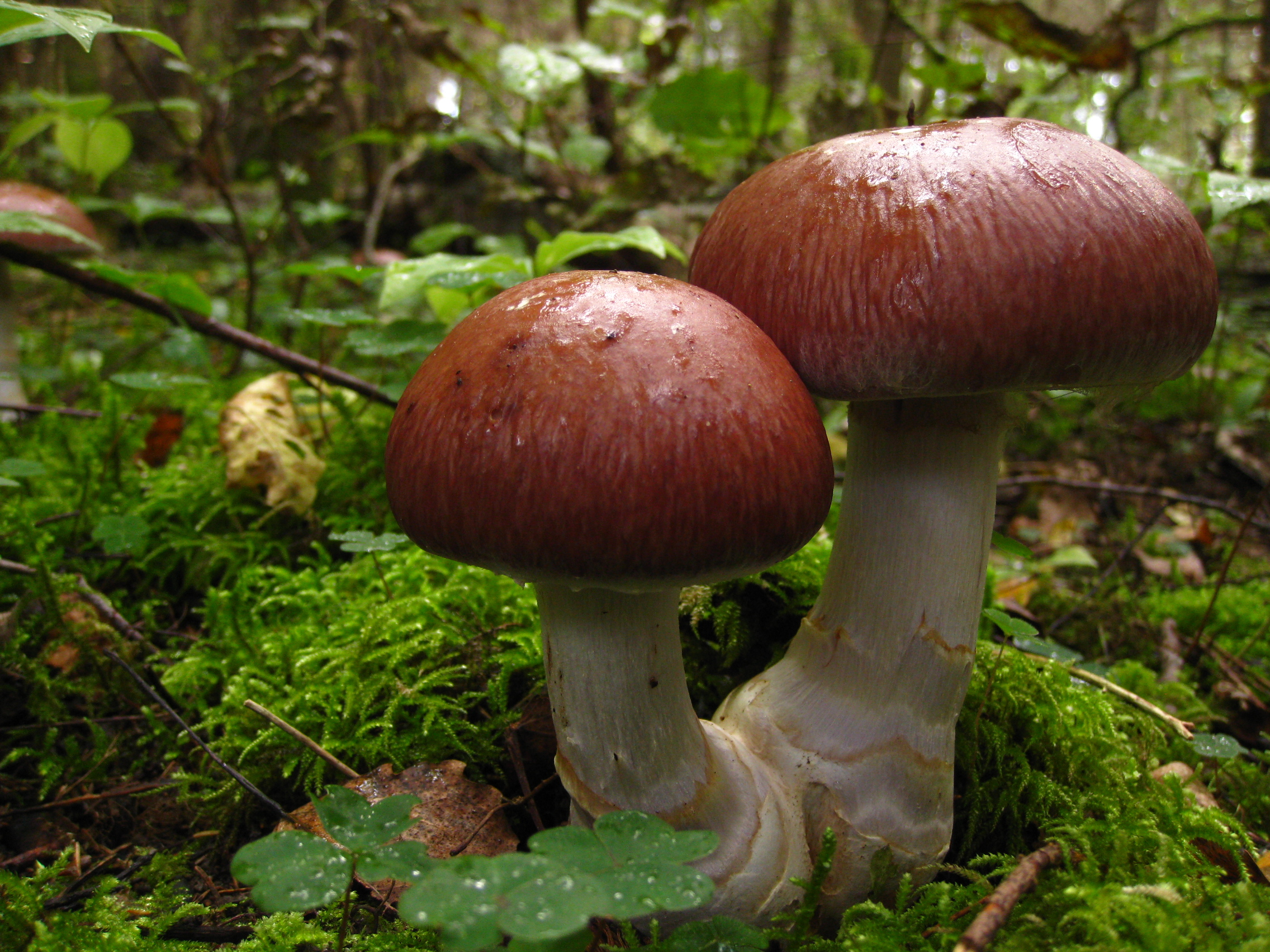
C. praestans (Cordier 1826) Gillet 1876

- Cortinarius pachynemeus M.M. Moser (1975)
- Cortinarius pachypus M.M. Moser (1968)
- Cortinarius pachythelis M.M. Moser (1975)
- Cortinarius pachythrix M.M. Moser (1975)
- Cortinarius pacificus Liimat., Niskanen & Ammirati (2022)
- Cortinarius paezii Garrido-Benavent, Ballarà, Liimat. & Mahiques (2020)
- Cortinarius paguentus Garrido & E. Horak (1988)
- Cortinarius pakistanicus A. Naseer & A.N. Khalid (2020)
- Cortinarius palatinus E. Harrower (2015) – Costa Rica
- Cortinarius paliformis Thiers (1960)
- Cortinarius palissandrinus Soop (2013)
- Cortinarius pallens Eyssart. & Reumaux (2001)
- Cortinarius pallidibrunneus Niskanen, Kytov. & Liimat. (2020)
- Cortinarius pallidipes M.M. Moser ex Nezdojm. (1983)
- Cortinarius pallidoferrugineus Bidaud (2014)
- Cortinarius pallidofulvus Rob. Henry (1968)
- Cortinarius pallidogriseus (Rob. Henry) Bidaud & Reumaux (2009)
- Cortinarius pallidolamellatus E. Horak & M.M. Moser (1975)
- Cortinarius pallidolutescens Rob. Henry (1958)
- Cortinarius pallidophyllus Reumaux (2008)
- Cortinarius pallidostriatoides Moënne-Locc. & Reumaux (2003)
- Cortinarius pallidostriatus Rob. Henry (1968)
- Cortinarius pallidulus Rob. Henry (1957)
- Cortinarius pallidus Peck (1889)
- Cortinarius palmicola Sathe & J.T. Daniel (1981)
- Cortinarius paludicola M.M. Moser (1975)
- Cortinarius paludinellus Moënne-Locc. (2003)
- Cortinarius paludosaniosus Liimat., Niskanen, Dima & Ammirati (2017)
- Cortinarius paludosus Peck (1890)
- Cortinarius panamaensis Corrales, Ovrebo, Ammirati, Liimat. & Niskanen (2021)
- Cortinarius panchrous E. Horak (1975)
- Cortinarius panellus Soop (2009)
- Cortinarius pantherinus Jul. Schäff. ex Reumaux (2004)
- Cortinarius papaver Soop (2001)
- Cortinarius papuanus E. Horak (1995)
- Cortinarius parabibulus M.M. Moser (1975)
- Cortinarius paracrassus Reumaux (1995)
- Cortinarius paracyanopus Moënne-Locc. & Reumaux (1996)
- Cortinarius paradoxus M.M. Moser & E. Horak (1975)
- Cortinarius parafraudulosus Rob. Henry (1989)
- Cortinarius paragaudis Fr. (1838)
- Cortinarius paralbocyaneus Eyssart. (2002)
- Cortinarius paramethystinus Bidaud & Moënne-Locc. (2002)
- Cortinarius paramoenolens Rob. Henry (1952)
- Cortinarius paranomalus Rob. Henry (1992)
- Cortinarius paraochraceus M.M. Moser (1975)
- Cortinarius paraoniti Soop (2013)
- Cortinarius paraonui Soop (2005)
- Cortinarius paraplatypus Reumaux (2001)
- Cortinarius parasebaceus Rob. Henry (1989)
- Cortinarius parastemmatus Bidaud (2010)
- Cortinarius paraviolaceus M.M. Moser (1987)
- Cortinarius paraxanthus Soop (2005)
- Cortinarius paraxenosma Soop & Dima (2020)
- Cortinarius parazureus E. Horak (1975)
- Cortinarius pardinipes Romagn. (1977)
- Cortinarius pardipes Rob. Henry (1985)
- Cortinarius parelegantior Moënne-Locc. & Reumaux (2003)
- Cortinarius parevernioides Bidaud (2014)
- Cortinarius parfumatus Bohus (1979)
- Cortinarius parherpeticus Rob. Henry (1952)
- Cortinarius parhonestus Reumaux (2012)
- Cortinarius parkeri Ammirati, M.T. Seidl & O. Ceska (2012)
- Cortinarius paropimus Carteret & Reumaux (2011)
- Cortinarius paruraceus Melot (1980)
- Cortinarius parvannulatus Kühner (1955)
- Cortinarius parvepilus Rob. Henry (1985)
- Cortinarius parvoacetosus Niskanen & Liimat. (2022)
- Cortinarius parvostriatus Rob. Henry & Contu (1985)
- Cortinarius parvulisemen Rob. Henry (1961)
- Cortinarius parvulobtusus Rob. Henry (1968)
- Cortinarius parvulosquamolosus Corrales, Ovrebo, Ammirati, Dima & Liimat. (2022)
- Cortinarius parvulus Rob. Henry (1941)
- Cortinarius pastoralis Soop, H. Lindstr., Dima, Niskanen, Liimat. & Kytöv. (2016) - Finland (holotype), Estonia, Sweden
- Cortinarius patagoniensis San-Fabian, Niskanen & Liimat. (2018)
- Cortinarius paucicolor E. Horak (1975)
- Cortinarius paululus Kokkonen (2020)
- Cortinarius paulus Kokkonen (2020)
- Cortinarius pauperculus J. Favre (1955)
- Cortinarius pavelekii (Trappe, Castellano & P. Rawl.) Peintner & M.M. Moser (2002)
- Cortinarius paxilloides (M.M. Moser) M.M. Moser (1967)
- Cortinarius pearsonii P.D. Orton (1958)
- Cortinarius pectochelis Soop (2008) – New Zealand
- Cortinarius pedemirus Chevassut & Rob. Henry (1985)
- Cortinarius peladae M.M. Moser (1975)
- Cortinarius pelargoniosmus Carteret (2004)
- Cortinarius pelargoniostriatulus Bidaud & Fillion (2010)
- Cortinarius pelerinii Bellanger, Carteret & Reumaux (2013)
- Cortinarius pelitnocephalus Rob. Henry (1957)
- Cortinarius pellin Garrido (1988)
- Cortinarius pellstonianus Ammirati & A.H. Sm. (1972)
- Cortinarius pellucidus M.M. Moser & E. Horak (1975)
- Cortinarius peraltus (Rob. Henry) Rob. Henry (1992)
- Cortinarius peramaricatus (Rob. Henry) Reumaux (2006)
- Cortinarius perannulatus Bidaud (2005)
- Cortinarius peraurantiacus Peintner & M.M. Moser (2002)
- Cortinarius peraureus Soop (1998)
- Cortinarius peraurilis Soop & Dima (2018) - Aotearoa New Zealand
- Cortinarius percandelaris Reumaux (2008)
- Cortinarius percomatus Rob. Henry (1984)
- Cortinarius percomium Rob. Henry ex Bidaud & Reumaux (2004)
- Cortinarius percyaneus Rob. Henry (1963)
- Cortinarius perelegans Soop (2001)
- Cortinarius perferrugineus Murrill (1939)
- Cortinarius perfoetens E. Horak, Peintner, M.M. Moser & Vilgalys (2002)
- Cortinarius perfulmineus Bidaud, Bernaer & Moënne-Locc. (2003)
- Cortinarius pergemellus Bidaud (2014)
- Cortinarius perizonium E. Horak (1975)
- Cortinarius perjurus Bidaud & Reumaux (2013)
- Cortinarius perlaetissimus Moënne-Locc. & Reumaux (2004)
- Cortinarius perlaetus Rob. Henry (1969)
- Cortinarius permirus Carteret (2012)
- Cortinarius permixtus Rob. Henry (1970)
- Cortinarius pernudipes Bidaud (2013)
- Cortinarius perochraceus M.M. Moser (1975)
- Cortinarius peronatorugosus Rob. Henry (1957)
- Cortinarius peronatosericeus Rob. Henry (1957)
- Cortinarius perornatus Rob. Henry (1983)
- Cortinarius perpallidus M.M. Moser & E. Horak (1975)
- Cortinarius perplexus Bojantchev, Ammirati & N. Siegel (2015)
- Cortinarius perrotensis A. Paul, Matheny & Lebeuf (2021)
- Cortinarius perrugatus Rob. Henry ex Carteret (2012)
- Cortinarius perscitus Rob. Henry (1983)
- Cortinarius persimilis Eyssart. & Carteret (2018)
- Cortinarius personatus M.M. Moser (1967)
- Cortinarius persoonianus Bidaud (2009)
- Cortinarius persplendidus Gasparini (2006)
- Cortinarius perviolaceus Murrill (1946)
- Cortinarius perzonatus Reumaux (2004)
- Cortinarius pescolanensis Picillo & Marchionni (2016)
- Cortinarius peumo Garrido (1988)
- Cortinarius phaeocephalus E. Horak (1975)
- Cortinarius phaeochlorus E. Horak (1990)
- Cortinarius phaeochrous J. Favre (1955)
- Cortinarius phaeoleucoides Chevassut & Rob. Henry (1982)
- Cortinarius phaeoloma Rob. Henry (1961)
- Cortinarius phaeomyxa (E. Horak) Peintner, E. Horak, M.M. Moser & Vilgalys (2002)
- Cortinarius phaeophyllus P. Karst. (1879)
- Cortinarius phaeopsathyrus Rob. Henry (1961)
- Cortinarius phaeopygmaeus J. Favre (1955)
- Cortinarius phaeoruber Chevassut & Rob. Henry (1982)
- Cortinarius phaeosmus Rob. Henry (1981)
- Cortinarius phaeouranus Gasparini (2007)
- Cortinarius phalarus Bougher & R.N. Hilton (1989)
- Cortinarius phaleratus (Fr.) Peintner, M.M. Moser, E. Horak & Vilgalys (2002)
- Cortinarius phellochrous E. Horak (1975)
- Cortinarius phenolicus M.M. Moser (1975)
- Cortinarius phlegmophorus K.A. Thomas, M.M. Moser, Peintner & Manim. (2003)
- Cortinarius pholideus (Lilj.) Fr. (1838)
- Cortinarius pholiotellus Soop (1998)
- Cortinarius phylladus Rob. Henry (1983)
- Cortinarius phyllophilus Peck (1912)
- Cortinarius piceidisjungendus Kytöv., Liimat., Niskanen & Ammirati (2014)
- Cortinarius picosporus M.M. Moser (1975)
- Cortinarius pihiur Speg. (1887)
- Cortinarius pikrus Garrido (1988)
- Cortinarius pilatii Svrček (1968)
- Cortinarius pinetorum (Fr.) Kauffman (1923)
- Cortinarius pinguis (Zeller) Peintner & M.M. Moser (2002)
- Cortinarius pinigaudis Niskanen, Kytöv. & Liimat. (2011)
- Cortinarius pinisquamulosus Kytov., Niskanen & Liimat. (2020)
- Cortinarius piriformis (Cleland & G. Cunn.) Peintner & M.M. Moser (2002)
- Cortinarius pisciodoratus Bidaud & Fillion (2011)
- Cortinarius pisciodorus (E. Horak) Peintner & M.M. Moser (2002) – New Zealand
- Cortinarius pistorius Jul. Schäff. (1947)
- Cortinarius pitkinensis Ammirati, Liimat. & Niskanen (2014)
- Cortinarius pituitosus E. Horak (1990)
- Cortinarius plumbosoides Moënne-Locc. & Reumaux (1991)
- Cortinarius plumbosus Fr. (1838)
- Cortinarius plumulosus Rob. Henry (1977)
- Cortinarius pocillodiscus Chevassut & Rob. Henry (1982)
- Cortinarius poecilochroma Rob. Henry (1990)
- Cortinarius poecilopus Rob. Henry (1956)
- Cortinarius poecilosperma Rob. Henry (1956)
- Cortinarius poeneferruginascens Rob. Henry (1956)
- Cortinarius polaris Høil. (1984)
- Cortinarius poliodes Bidaud, Moënne-Locc. & Reumaux (1993)
- Cortinarius politus Niskanen, Liimat. & Ammirati (2013)
- Cortinarius polyadelphus M.M. Moser (1975)
- Cortinarius polychrous Rob. Henry (1952)
- Cortinarius polycrossus Rob. Henry (1989)
- Cortinarius polymorphus Rob. Henry (1985)
- Cortinarius poppyzon Melot (1989)
- Cortinarius populorum Reumaux (1990)
- Cortinarius porphyreticovestitus Bidaud (2004)
- Cortinarius porphyreus E. Horak (1975)
- Cortinarius porphyroideus Peintner & M.M. Moser (2002) - New Zealand
- Cortinarius porphyrophaeus E. Horak (1990)
- Cortinarius porricolor Bidaud, Moënne-Locc. & Reumaux (2004)
- Cortinarius praebrevipes Murrill (1938)
- Cortinarius praecutus Kärcher (2005)
- Cortinarius praefelleus Murrill (1939)
- Cortinarius praelatus M.M. Moser (1975)
- Cortinarius praepallens (Peck) Sacc. (1891)
- Cortinarius praestans (Cordier) Gillet (1876) – goliath webcap (Europe)
- Cortinarius praestigiosus (Fr.) E. Berger (1846)
- Cortinarius praetervisus Melot (1989)
- Cortinarius prasinoides Moënne-Locc., Reumaux & Fern. Sas. (2004)
- Cortinarius pratensis (Bon & Gaugué) Høil. (1984)
- Cortinarius preslianus (Velen.) Rob. Henry (1984)
- Cortinarius primotectus Rob. Henry (1981)
- Cortinarius privignatus Soop (2010)
- Cortinarius privigniformis Murrill (1945)
- Cortinarius privignipallens Kytöv., Niskanen & Liimat. (2014)
- Cortinarius privignoides Rob. Henry (1985)
- Cortinarius procalans Moënne-Locc. & Reumaux (1994)
- Cortinarius procax Melot (1980)
- Cortinarius procerus Bidaud & Moënne-Locc. (1992)
- Cortinarius prodigiosus B. Bušek, Mikšík, Borov., D. Dvořák, L. Albert & Dima (2015)
- Cortinarius promethenus Soop (2013)
- Cortinarius proprius Herp. (1912)
- Cortinarius proximus-unus (Ramm & Rob. Henry) Bidaud, Moënne-Locc., Reumaux & Rob. Henry (2000)
- Cortinarius pruinatus Bidaud, Moënne-Locc. & Reumaux (1993)
- Cortinarius prunicola Miyauchi & His. Kobay. (1998)
- Cortinarius psammicola Kytöv., Niskanen & Liimat. (2017)
- Cortinarius psammocephalus (Bull.) Fr. (1838)
- Cortinarius psammophilus Ade (1911)
- Cortinarius psammopodioides E. Horak (1975)
- Cortinarius psammouraceus M. Lange (1957)
- Cortinarius psathyrobtusus Rob. Henry (1968)
- Cortinarius pseliocaulis Soop & J.A. Cooper (2018) - Aotearoa New Zealand
- Cortinarius pselioticton Soop (2008) – New Zealand
- Cortinarius pseudarcuatorum Rob. Henry (1986)
- Cortinarius pseudarmeniacus Rob. Henry (1970)
- Cortinarius pseudoacutus Liimat. & Niskanen (2021)
- Cortinarius pseudoanomalus E. Ludw. (2017)
- Cortinarius pseudoanthracinus Reumaux (1994)
- Cortinarius pseudoarmeniacoides Carteret & Reumaux (2008)
- Cortinarius pseudobalaustinus Carteret & Reumaux (2013)
- Cortinarius pseudobiformis Bidaud & Carteret (2012)
- Cortinarius pseudobolaris Maire (1923)
- Cortinarius pseudobovinus M.M. Moser & Ammirati (1995)
- Cortinarius pseudobulbosus Carteret & Reumaux (2010)
- Cortinarius pseudobulliardoides Carteret & Reumaux (2014)
- Cortinarius pseudocandelaris (M.M. Moser) M.M. Moser (1967)
- Cortinarius pseudocaninus Rob. Henry (1981)
- Cortinarius pseudoclaricolor E. Horak & M.M. Moser (1975)
- Cortinarius pseudocollinitus Rob. Henry ex Rob. Henry & Ramm (2000)
- Cortinarius pseudocompar M.M. Moser (2001)
- Cortinarius pseudocrassoides Rob. Henry (1977)
- Cortinarius pseudocyanites Rob. Henry ex Bidaud & Reumaux (2005)
- Cortinarius pseudodionysae Bidaud (2008)
- Cortinarius pseudoduracinus Rob. Henry (1938)
- Cortinarius pseudofallax Carteret (2004)
- Cortinarius pseudofervidus Niskanen, Liimat., Ammirati & Kytöv. (2014)
- Cortinarius pseudoflabellus Bidaud (2010)
- Cortinarius pseudofulgens Rob. Henry (1952)
- Cortinarius pseudofulmineus Rob. Henry (1939)
- Cortinarius pseudofulvescens Bidaud (2009)
- Cortinarius pseudofusisporus Bidaud (2010)
- Cortinarius pseudogracilior Reumaux (2006)
- Cortinarius pseudograllipes Herp. (1912)
- Cortinarius pseudohesleri Ammirati, Liimat. & Halling (2022)
- Cortinarius pseudojubarinus Bidaud, Moënne-Locc. & Reumaux (2013)
- Cortinarius pseudonapus (Rob. Henry ex M.M. Moser) M.M. Moser (1967)
- Cortinarius pseudopaleaceus Herp. (1912)
- Cortinarius pseudophlegma Rob. Henry (1981)
- Cortinarius pseudopolaris Bidaud (2016)
- Cortinarius pseudoporphyropus Gasparini (2007)
- Cortinarius pseudoprasinus Bidaud & Moënne-Locc. (2004)
- Cortinarius pseudopumilus Moënne-Locc. (2000)
- Cortinarius pseudopurpurascens Hongo (1953)
- Cortinarius pseudoputorius Ammirati, Dima & Liimat. (2022)
- Cortinarius pseudorigens Rob. Henry (1970)
- Cortinarius pseudorotundisporus Gasparini (2008) – Australia
- Cortinarius pseudorubricosus Reumaux (1990)
- Cortinarius pseudorugulosus Rob. Henry ex Bidaud & Reumaux (2006)
- Cortinarius pseudosalor J.E. Lange (1940)
- Cortinarius pseudoscauroides Reumaux & Frund (2009)
- Cortinarius pseudoscutulatus Rob. Henry (1938)
- Cortinarius pseudosodagnitus Rob. Henry (1992)
- Cortinarius pseudosuillus Rob. Henry (1959)
- Cortinarius pseudotorvus A. Naseer, J. Khan & A.N. Khalid (2020)
- Cortinarius pseudotraganus Rob. Henry (1959)
- Cortinarius pseudotubarius Robar, K.A. Harrison & Grund (1981)
- Cortinarius pseudovariicolor Damblon & Lambinon (1959)
- Cortinarius pseudovenetus Rob. Henry (1961)
- Cortinarius pseudoxiphidipus Salgado Salomón & Peintner (2021)
- Cortinarius psittacinus M.M. Moser (1970)
- Cortinarius psuedoherpeticus Rob. Henry (1976)
- Cortinarius pudorinus E. Horak (1975)
- Cortinarius puellaris Brandrud, Bendiksen & Dima (2015)
- Cortinarius pulcher Peck (1873)
- Cortinarius pulcherrimus (Velen.) Rob. Henry (1991)
- Cortinarius pulchrifolius Peck (1883)
- Cortinarius pulchripes J. Favre (1948)
- Cortinarius pulverobtusus Rob. Henry (1968)
- Cortinarius pumanquensis M.M. Moser (1972)
- Cortinarius punctatiformis Carteret (2012)
- Cortinarius puramolens Rob. Henry (1981)
- Cortinarius purpuratus Rob. Henry (1985)
- Cortinarius purpurellus M.M. Moser, E. Horak, Peintner & Vilgalys (2002)
- Cortinarius purpureobrunneus M.M. Moser (1975)
- Cortinarius purpureocapitatus X. Yue Wang, J.A. Cooper, A.R. Nilsen & Orlovich (2020) – New Zealand
- Cortinarius purpureoluteus Lamoure (1977)
- Cortinarius purpureopallens Reumaux (1994)
- Cortinarius purpureophyllus Kauffman (1918)
- Cortinarius purpureus (Bull.) Bidaud, Moënne-Locc. & Reumaux (1994)
- Cortinarius pusillus Murrill (1945)
- Cortinarius pustulatus (Bidaud) Bidaud (2007)
- Cortinarius putorius Niskanen, Liimat. & Ammirati (2015)
- Cortinarius pygmaeus Fr. (1838)
- Cortinarius pyrenaicus Ballarà, M.M. Gómez & Cadiñanos (2016)
- Cortinarius pyrinophyllus Rob. Henry (1989)
- Cortinarius pyromyxa M.M. Moser & E. Horak (1975)
- Cortinarius pyrrophaeus Rob. Henry (1983)

== Q ==
- Cortinarius quadrisporus Nouhra & Kuhar (2021)
- Cortinarius quaerendus Rob. Henry (1989) – France
- Cortinarius quarciticus H. Lindstr. (1994) – Sweden
- Cortinarius quaresimalis Gasparini (2007) – Australia (Tasmania)
- Cortinarius quercoarmillatus Ammirati, Halling & Garnica (2007) – Costa Rica
- Cortinarius quercoconicus Liimat., Kytöv. & Niskanen (2017)
- Cortinarius quercoflocculosus Kałucka & Liimat. (2021)
- Cortinarius quercophilus Y. Lamoureux, Lebeuf, A. Paul & J. Landry (2021)
- Cortinarius quercuum Armada (2021)
- Cortinarius quidemolens Rob. Henry (1986) – France

== R ==
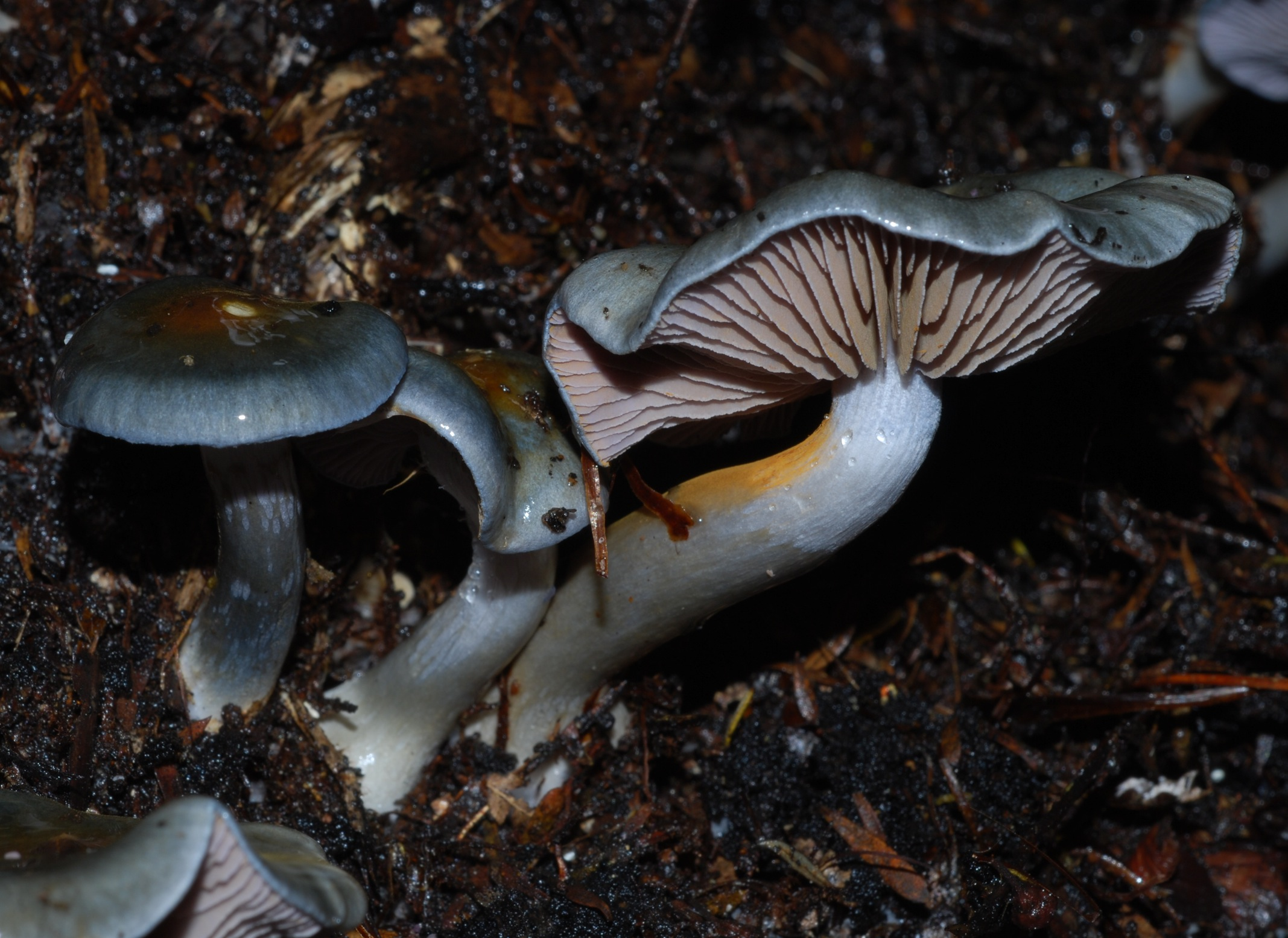
C. rotundisporus Cleland & Cheel 1918

- Cortinarius radians Earle (1902)
- Cortinarius radicans (Velen.) Moënne-Locc. & Reumaux (1989)
- Cortinarius radicidurus Bidaud (2013)
- Cortinarius radicifer Consiglio & Reumaux (2012)
- Cortinarius radicosissimus Moënne-Locc. (1997)
- Cortinarius radiofibrillosus A. Pearson (1951)
- Cortinarius rainierensis A.H. Sm. & D.E. Stuntz (1950)
- Cortinarius rammii Rob. Henry & Ramm (1989)
- Cortinarius rancidus M.M. Moser (1975)
- Cortinarius rapaceus Fr. (1838)
- Cortinarius raphanodiabolicus Rob. Henry (1983)
- Cortinarius raphanoides (Pers.) Fr. (1838) – edible, but deadly look-alikes (C. gentilis)
- Cortinarius rapiolens M.M. Moser (1975)
- Cortinarius rarissimus Reumaux (2000)
- Cortinarius rarus Bojantchev, Ammirati, Parker, Liimat., Niskanen & Dima (2021)
- Cortinarius rastetteri Rob. Henry (1981)
- Cortinarius rattinoides Soop (2008) – New Zealand
- Cortinarius redactus Britzelm. (1885)
- Cortinarius redimitus (Fr.) Cooke (1888)
- Cortinarius regalis A.H. Sm. & P.M. Rea (1944)
- Cortinarius regis-romae Rob. Henry (1977)
- Cortinarius regularis Peck (1878)
- Cortinarius repertus A. Favre & Vialard (2004)
- Cortinarius resectipes Rob. Henry (1968)
- Cortinarius resinaceus M.M. Moser & McKnight (1995)
- Cortinarius respersus Melot (1992)
- Cortinarius reticulisporus Miyauchi (2001)
- Cortinarius rhaebopus (M.M. Moser) M.M. Moser (1967)
- Cortinarius rickenianorum Rob. Henry (1992)
- Cortinarius rickenianus Maire (1937)
- Cortinarius rickenii Rob. Henry ex Bidaud, Moënne-Locc. & Reumaux (2000)
- Cortinarius rigens (Pers.) Fr. (1838)
- Cortinarius rigentium Bidaud & Carteret (2008)
- Cortinarius rigidiannulatus A. de Haan, Lenaerts & Volders (2000)
- Cortinarius rigidipes M.M. Moser (1968)
- Cortinarius rigidiusculus Nezdojm. (1983)
- Cortinarius rigidus (Scop.) Fr. (1838)
- Cortinarius rimosofissus Rob. Henry (1983)
- Cortinarius rimosus Peck (1897)
- Cortinarius riopancensis M.M. Moser (1975)
- Cortinarius rioussetorum Bidaud, Moënne-Locc. & Reumaux (2000)
- Cortinarius roberti-henrici Contu (1988)
- Cortinarius roblemaulicola Garrido & E. Horak (1988)
- Cortinarius roblerauli M.E. Salgado Salomón & U. Peintner (2018)
- Cortinarius roblicola Garrido (1988)
- Cortinarius robustus Peck (1878)
- Cortinarius romagnesii Rob. Henry (1937)
- Cortinarius roseipes (Velen.) Reumaux (1992)
- Cortinarius roseivelatus Kytöv., Liimat. & Niskanen (2014)
- Cortinarius roseoarmillatus Niskanen, Kytöv. & Liimat. (2011)
- Cortinarius roseobasalis Ammirati, Beug, Liimat., Niskanen & O. Ceska (2016)
- Cortinarius roseobrunneus Carteret (2000)
- Cortinarius roseobulbus M.M. Moser (1997)
- Cortinarius roseobulliardioides Kytöv., Niskanen, Liimat. & Ammirati (2021)
- Cortinarius roseocalceolatus E. Horak & M.M. Moser (1975)
- Cortinarius roseolilacinus (Bougher, Fuhrer & E. Horak) Peintner, E. Horak, M.M. Moser & Vilgalys (2002)
- Cortinarius roseomyceliosus Bidaud (2009)
- Cortinarius roseonudipes Rob. Henry & Moënne-Locc. (1997)
- Cortinarius roseopallidus Murrill (1915)
- Cortinarius roseopurpurascens M.M. Moser & E. Horak (1975)
- Cortinarius roseovariatus Rob. Henry (1989)
- Cortinarius rossicioenochelis Liimat., Kytöv. & Niskanen (2017)
- Cortinarius rotundisporus Cleland & Cheel (1918) – Australia
- Cortinarius rozites Gasparini (2008) – Australia
- Cortinarius rubellopes Rob. Henry (1937)
- Cortinarius rubellus Cooke (1887)
- Cortinarius rubenii A. de Haan & Volders (2013)
- Cortinarius rubens Kauffman (1918)
- Cortinarius ruber Cleland (1927)
- Cortinarius rubescens Gasparini (2007)
- Cortinarius rubeus Robar, K.A. Harrison & Grund (1981)
- Cortinarius rubricosissimus Chevassut & Rob. Henry (1982)
- Cortinarius rubricosoides Bidaud & Carteret (2014)
- Cortinarius rubricosus (Fr.) Fr. (1838)
- Cortinarius rubrimarginatus Soop (2018) - Aotearoa New Zealand
- Cortinarius rubripes Peck (1906)
- Cortinarius rubripurpuratus Soop (2008)
- Cortinarius rubrobasalis M.M. Moser & E. Horak (1975)
- Cortinarius rubrobrunneus Ammirati, Liimat. & Niskanen (2014)
- Cortinarius rubrocinctus Reumaux (1995)
- Cortinarius rubrocinereus Peck (1883)
- Cortinarius rubroclavus L. Krieg. (1927)
- Cortinarius rubrophyllus (Moënne-Locc.) Liimat., Niskanen, Ammirati & Dima (2014)
- Cortinarius rubrosanguineus Bidaud, Moënne-Locc. & Reumaux (1994)
- Cortinarius rubroviolaceus Gasparini (2014)
- Cortinarius rubrovioleipes Bendiksen & K. Bendiksen (1993)
- Cortinarius rufobrunneus M.M. Moser (1975)
- Cortinarius rufoconnatus Rob. Henry (1983)
- Cortinarius rufoides San-Fabian, Niskanen & Liimat. (2018)
- Cortinarius rufomyrrheus Eyssart., Sleiman & Bellanger (2023)
- Cortinarius rufosanguineus S.D. Adams, Ammirati & Liimat. (2021)
- Cortinarius rufosimilis San-Fabian, Niskanen & Liimat. (2018)
- Cortinarius rufostriatus J. Favre (1955)
- Cortinarius rufoviolaceus Rob. Henry (1982)
- Cortinarius rufuloides Bidaud, Moënne-Locc. & Reumaux (2000)
- Cortinarius rufulus Reumaux (1994)
- Cortinarius rufus M.M. Moser (1975)
- Cortinarius rugatofibrillosus A. Favre (1997)
- Cortinarius rugosiceps (E. Horak & G.M. Taylor) Peintner, E. Horak, M.M. Moser & Vilgalys (2002)
- Cortinarius rugosolilacinus Miyauchi (2002)
- Cortinarius rugosus Rob. Henry (1945)
- Cortinarius ruizii Fern. Sas. (2003)
- Cortinarius rumoribrunsi Bojantchev, Ammirati, Niskanen & Liimat. (2017)
- Cortinarius russeocinnamomeus Cleland (1928)
- Cortinarius russeus Rob. Henry (1985)
- Cortinarius russii Bidaud & Moënne-Locc. (1993)
- Cortinarius russulaespermus Carteret (2004)
- Cortinarius russulariellus Speg. (1887)
- Cortinarius rusticelloides Kokkonen (2020)
- Cortinarius rusticellus J. Favre (1955)
- Cortinarius rusticus P. Karst. (1883)

== S ==
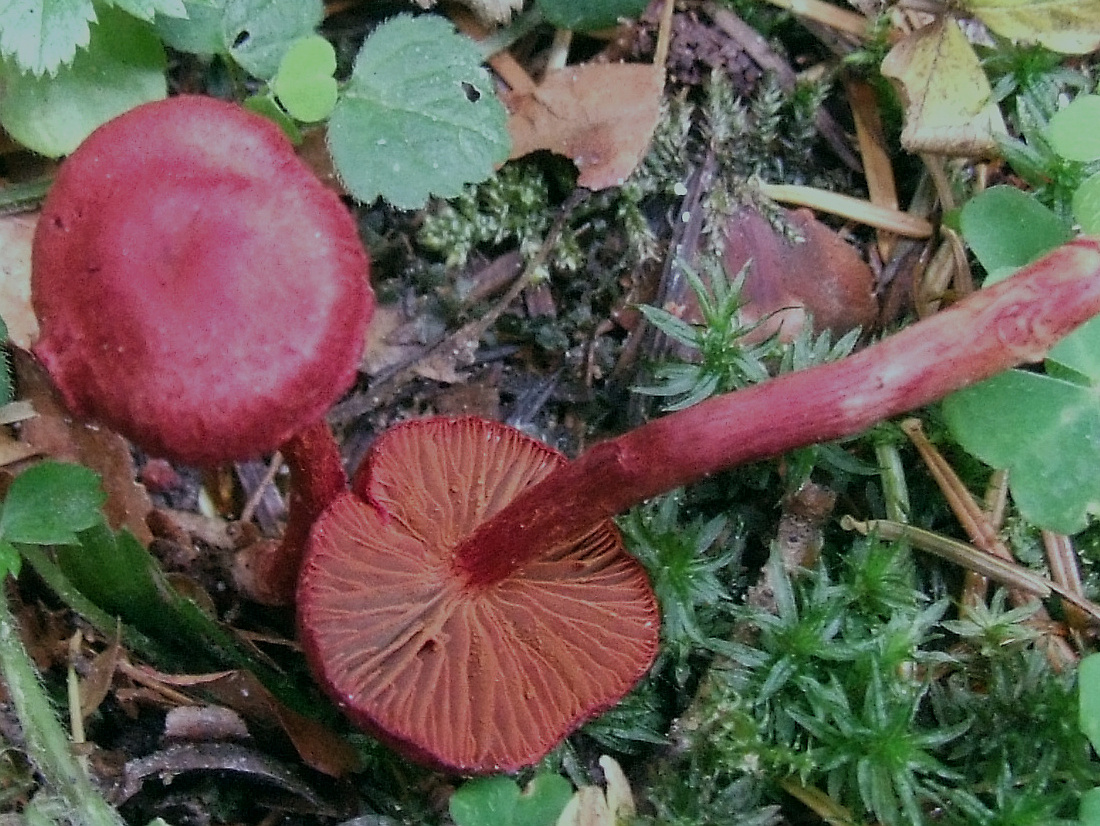
C. sanguineus (Wulfen 1781) Gray 1821

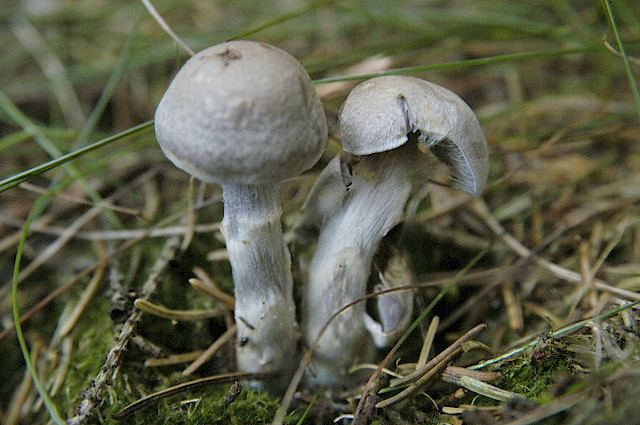
C. salor Fr. 1838

- Cortinarius sabuletorum Redeuilh & Reumaux (1995)
- Cortinarius sabulicola Rob. Henry & Contu (1987)
- Cortinarius saccharatus M.M. Moser (1975)
- Cortinarius sacchariosmus Bon (1975)
- Cortinarius saevus (Rob. Henry) Bidaud (2009)
- Cortinarius sagacitas Kytov., Niskanen & Liimat. (2020)
- Cortinarius sagarum Kokkonen (2020)
- Cortinarius sagatus M.M. Moser (1975)
- Cortinarius salicinus Bidaud & Carteret (2014)
- Cortinarius salicis Rob. Henry (1977)
- Cortinarius salicis-rosmarinifoliae Svrček (1996)
- Cortinarius salicticola Volders & Gelderblom (2013)
- Cortinarius salignus (M.M. Moser & Gerw. Keller) G. Garnier (1992)
- Cortinarius salmaster Gasparini (2007)
- Cortinarius salmastrium Soop (2018) - Aotearoa New Zealand
- Cortinarius salmoneobasalis Bidaud (2004)
- Cortinarius salmoneoroseascens Chevassut & Rob. Henry (1978)
- Cortinarius salmoneotomentosus Rob. Henry (1977)
- Cortinarius salor Fr. (1838) – Europe, east to Japan and New Guinea
- Cortinarius sanguineophyllus Carteret (2013)
- Cortinarius sanguineus (Wulfen) Gray (1821) – Europe, North America
- Cortinarius sanguinolentus (Moënne-Locc. & Reumaux) Moënne-Locc. & Reumaux (2000)
- Cortinarius saniosus (Fr.) Fr. (1838)
- Cortinarius sarcinochrous Peintner & M.M. Moser (2002)
- Cortinarius sarcoflammeus Esteve-Rav., Gerw. Keller & A. Ortega (2001)
- Cortinarius sarkae-ferocis Svrček (1996)
- Cortinarius sarmienti Speg. (1887)
- Cortinarius saturatus J.E. Lange (1940)
- Cortinarius saturninus (Fr.) Fr. (1838)
- Cortinarius saturniorum Soop (2001)
- Cortinarius saturnoides Rob. Henry (1956)
- Cortinarius saugetii Rob. Henry (1937)
- Cortinarius savegrensis Ammirati, Halling & Garnica (2007)
- Cortinarius scabridipileus Kytov., Liimat. & Niskanen (2020)
- Cortinarius scabrosporus M.M. Moser (1975)
- Cortinarius scabrosus (Cooke & Massee) Peintner & M.M. Moser (2002)
- Cortinarius scandens Fr. (1838)
- Cortinarius scauroides Rob. Henry (1939)
- Cortinarius scaurotraganoides Rob. Henry (1986)
- Cortinarius schedisus Rob. Henry (1983)
- Cortinarius scintillatus M.M. Moser (1975)
- Cortinarius sciophylloides Bidaud (2015)
- Cortinarius sciurellus Soop (2014)
- Cortinarius sciurodes M.M. Moser & E. Horak (1975)
- Cortinarius sclerophyllorum Gasparini (2007)
- Cortinarius sclerospermus Peintner & M.M. Moser (2002)
- Cortinarius scobinaceus Malençon & Bertault (1970)
- Cortinarius scolecinus M.M. Moser (1975)
- Cortinarius scoticus Niskanen & Liimat. (2020) – UK
- Cortinarius scotoides J. Favre (1955)
- Cortinarius scutulatus (Fr.) Fr. (1838)
- Cortinarius sebaceus Fr. (1838)
- Cortinarius sebosus A.A. Francis & Bougher (2004)
- Cortinarius seidliae Ammirati, Niskanen & Liimat. (2015)
- Cortinarius sejunctifolius Rob. Henry (1995)
- Cortinarius selinolens Bidaud & Bellanger (2021) – France, Spain, Tunisia
- Cortinarius semiamictus E. Horak (1975)
- Cortinarius semiglobatus M.M. Moser (1975)
- Cortinarius seminagnitus Rob. Henry (1956)
- Cortinarius semiodoratus Rob. Henry (1993)
- Cortinarius semipellucidus (M.M. Moser) G. Garnier (1992)
- Cortinarius semirubicundulus M.M. Moser (1975)
- Cortinarius semisanguineus (Fr.) Gillet (1876) – also known as Dermocybe semisanguinea red-gilled cortinar (Europe & North America)
- Cortinarius semivelatus Rob. Henry (1970)
- Cortinarius semivestitus M.M. Moser (1968)
- Cortinarius semudaphilus Rob. Henry ex Reumaux (2013)
- Cortinarius seponendus Rob. Henry (1989)
- Cortinarius septentrionalis Bendiksen, K. Bendiksen & Brandrud (1993)
- Cortinarius sequanus Rob. Henry (1977)
- Cortinarius serenitas-caeli Rob. Henry (1997)
- Cortinarius sergianus Bidaud & Eyssart. (2000)
- Cortinarius sericatus Ramain ex Rob. Henry (1989)
- Cortinarius sericeofulvus Bidaud, Carteret & Reumaux (2013)
- Cortinarius sericeolazulinus Ammirati, Halling & Garnica (2007)
- Cortinarius sericeo-ochraceus M.M. Moser (1975)
- Cortinarius sericeps Peck (1883)
- Cortinarius sericeus (Schaeff.) Henn. (1898)
- Cortinarius serotinus (Fr.) Bidaud, Moënne-Locc. & Reumaux (1996)
- Cortinarius serratissimus M.M. Moser (1968)
- Cortinarius shigaensis Hongo (1967)
- Cortinarius siccolens Rob. Henry (1989)
- Cortinarius siccus M.M. Moser (1975)
- Cortinarius sierraensis (Ammirati) Ammirati, Niskanen & Liimat. (2013) – North America
- Cortinarius silvae-monachi (D.A. Reid, Murton & N.J. Westwood) Melot (1989)
- Cortinarius similis (E. Horak) Peintner, E. Horak, M.M. Moser & Vilgalys (2002)
- Cortinarius simillimus Bidaud (2004)
- Cortinarius simplex E. Horak (1975)
- Cortinarius simulans (Peck) Sacc. (1891)
- Cortinarius simulatorius Reumaux (2002)
- Cortinarius simulatus P.D. Orton (1958)
- Cortinarius sinapicolor Cleland (1933) – Australia
- Cortinarius sinapivelus Danks, T. Lebel & Vernes (2010)
- Cortinarius sinapizans M.M. Moser (1967)
- Cortinarius sinensis L.H. Sun, T.Z. Wei & Y.J. Yao (2020)
- Cortinarius singeri M.M. Moser (1975)
- Cortinarius singerianus Peintner (2003)
- Cortinarius smithii Ammirati, Niskanen & Liimat. (2013) – North America
- Cortinarius sociatus Rob. Henry (1983)
- Cortinarius solis-occasus Melot (1986)
- Cortinarius solitarius Rob. Henry (1987)
- Cortinarius solivagus Reumaux (2008)
- Cortinarius sommerfeltii Høil. (1984)
- Cortinarius sordescens Rob. Henry (1944)
- Cortinarius sordescentipes Bidaud, Moënne-Locc. & Reumaux (1997)
- Cortinarius sordidemaculatus Rob. Henry (1981)
- Cortinarius sordipes A. de Haan & Volders (2003)
- Cortinarius soricinegriseus Rob. Henry (1985)
- Cortinarius sororiatus (P. Karst.) Reumaux (2006)
- Cortinarius spadix Herp. (1912)
- Cortinarius sparsus (Chevassut & Rob. Henry) Bidaud, Moënne-Locc. & Reumaux (1993)
- Cortinarius speciosus Earle (1905)
- Cortinarius sphaerocephalus (E. Horak & M.M. Moser) Peintner & M.M. Moser (2002)
- Cortinarius sphaerospermus Kauffman (1918)
- Cortinarius sphaerosporus Peck (1873)
- Cortinarius sphagneti Singer (1949)
- Cortinarius sphagnogenus (M.M. Moser) Nezdojm. (1976)
- Cortinarius sphagnoravus Liimat., Kytöv., Niskanen & Ammirati (2017)
- Cortinarius spheroideogranatus Rob. Henry (1989)
- Cortinarius spilomeus (Fr.) Fr. (1863)
- Cortinarius spinulosporus Reumaux (1993)
- Cortinarius spisnii Consiglio, D. Antonini & M. Antonini (2004)
- Cortinarius splendentium Chevassut & Rob. Henry (1982)
- Cortinarius splendidus Peck (1878) – also known as Dermocybe splendida splendid red skin-head Australia
- Cortinarius spodochrous Reumaux & Bidaud (2008)
- Cortinarius spodoleucus M.M. Moser (1975)
- Cortinarius spontescissus Chevassut & Rob. Henry (1982)
- Cortinarius sporanotus Rob. Henry (1969)
- Cortinarius sporovatus Rob. Henry (1970)
- Cortinarius spurcatus Moënne-Locc. & Reumaux (2001)
- Cortinarius squalidiformis Murrill (1946)
- Cortinarius squalidus A.H. Sm. (1942)
- Cortinarius squamicutis Bidaud & Savignoni (2000)
- Cortinarius squamiger M.M. Moser (1975)
- Cortinarius squamipes E. Horak (1975)
- Cortinarius squamivenetoideus Niskanen, Liimat. & Ammirati (2021)
- Cortinarius squamivenetus Kytöv., Liimat. & Niskanen (2014)
- Cortinarius squamosipes Rob. Henry (1938)
- Cortinarius squamosus E. Sesli (2021)
- Cortinarius squamulosus Peck (1872) – edible, but related species have unclassified edibility
- Cortinarius squarrosus Clem. (1901)
- Cortinarius squarrulosus Bidaud, Moënne-Locc. & Reumaux (1997)
- Cortinarius stellorugosus Rob. Henry (1985)
- Cortinarius stenospermus Lamoure (1987)
- Cortinarius stephanopus M.M. Moser & E. Horak (1975)
- Cortinarius sterilis Kauffman (1905)
- Cortinarius sterilobtusus Rob. Henry (1968)
- Cortinarius stillatitius Fr. (1838)
- Cortinarius stipitemirus Rob. Henry (1995)
- Cortinarius stipite-violascens Rob. Henry (1989)
- Cortinarius straminipes Murrill (1942)
- Cortinarius strenuisporus Bidaud, Cors. Gut. & Vila (2002)
- Cortinarius streptosmus Rob. Henry (1986)
- Cortinarius strictipes M.M. Moser (1975)
- Cortinarius striolatus Speg. (1887)
- Cortinarius strobilaceofulvus D. Antonini & M. Antonini (2002)
- Cortinarius stuntzii S.A. Rehner & Ammirati (1989)
- Cortinarius subaffinis Rob. Henry (1985)
- Cortinarius subalbidulus Reumaux (2000)
- Cortinarius subalbidus (A.H. Sm.) Peintner & M.M. Moser (2002)
- Cortinarius subalboviolaceus Hongo (1963)
- Cortinarius subamethystinus Rob. Henry (1985)
- Cortinarius subamoenolens Carteret & Reumaux ex Armada (2013)
- Cortinarius subarcheri Cleland (1928) – Australia
- Cortinarius subargentatus Murrill (1939)
- Cortinarius subargyronotus Niskanen, Liimat. & Kytöv. (2014)
- Cortinarius subarmillatus Hongo (1964)
- Cortinarius subarquatus (M.M. Moser) M.M. Moser (1967)
- Cortinarius subarvinaceus Cleland (1927)
- Cortinarius subaustralis A.H. Sm. & Hesler (1944)
- Cortinarius subavellanocoeruleus Bidaud & Reumaux (2008)
- Cortinarius subavellanofulvus Carteret & Reumaux (2003)
- Cortinarius subbalaustinus Rob. Henry (1991)
- Cortinarius subbivelus Kauffman (1907)
- Cortinarius subbolbitioides Reumaux (2000)
- Cortinarius subbrunneoideus Kytöv., Liimat. & Niskanen (2014)
- Cortinarius subbrunneus Bidaud, Carteret & Reumaux (2009)
- Cortinarius subbulliardioides Rob. Henry (1970)
- Cortinarius subcaesiobrunneus Y. Li & M.L. Xie (2019)
- Cortinarius subcaespitosus Murrill (1939)
- Cortinarius subcagei Niskanen & Liimat. (2017)
- Cortinarius subcalyptrosporus M.M. Moser (1987) – Malaysia
- Cortinarius subcamphoratus Murrill (1946)
- Cortinarius subcaninus Maire (1928)
- Cortinarius subcarabus Liimat., Kytöv. & Niskanen (2017)
- Cortinarius subcarneinatus Niskanen, Kytöv. & Liimat. (2017)
- Cortinarius subcartilagineus Rob. Henry (1968)
- Cortinarius subcastanellus E. Horak, Peintner, M.M. Moser & Vilgalys (2002) (previously Rozites castanella) - New Zealand
- Cortinarius subcastaneus Bidaud & Reumaux (2000)
- Cortinarius subcephalixus Bidaud, Consiglio, D. Antonini & M. Antonini (2005)
- Cortinarius subcinnamomeus P. Karst. (1889)
- Cortinarius subcommunis Murrill (1938)
- Cortinarius subcompactus Rob. Henry (1958)
- Cortinarius subconicus M.M. Moser (1975)
- Cortinarius subcoronatus Bidaud (2001)
- Cortinarius subcotoneipes Rob. Henry (1988)
- Cortinarius subcotoneus Bidaud (2005)
- Cortinarius subcrassus Rob. Henry (1983)
- Cortinarius subcristatosporus Bidaud & Carteret (2013)
- Cortinarius subcroceofolius Ammirati & A.H. Sm. (1972)
- Cortinarius subcroceophyllus Rob. Henry (1984)
- Cortinarius subcuspidatus A.H. Sm. (1944)
- Cortinarius subcylindripes Bidaud, Moënne-Locc. & Reumaux (2000)
- Cortinarius subcylindrosporus Reumaux (2010)
- Cortinarius subdecipiens Gelderblom & Volders (2013)
- Cortinarius subdelibutus Hongo (1958)
- Cortinarius subelatior Bidaud, Moënne-Locc. & Reumaux (2000)
- Cortinarius subelegantior Rob. Henry (1987)
- Cortinarius subemunctus Moënne-Locc. & Reumaux (1992)
- Cortinarius suberi Soop (1990)
- Cortinarius suberugatus Bidaud & Reumaux (2010)
- Cortinarius suberythraeus Carteret (2002)
- Cortinarius suberythrinus Moënne-Locc. (1988)
- Cortinarius subexitiosus Liimat., Niskanen, Kytöv. & Ammirati (2014)
- Cortinarius subferrugineoides Reumaux (1980)
- Cortinarius subfillionii Kytöv., Niskanen & Liimat. (2017)
- Cortinarius subfimbriatus Murrill (1946)
- Cortinarius subfirmus Bidaud (2015)
- Cortinarius subflavifolius Murrill (1939)
- Cortinarius subflexipes Peck (1888)
- Cortinarius subfloccopus Kytöv., Niskanen & Liimat. (2012)
- Cortinarius subfulmineus Murrill (1939)
- Cortinarius subfulvescens Bidaud (2009)
- Cortinarius subfuscoperonatus Y. Li & M.L. Xie (2020)
- Cortinarius subfusipes Rob. Henry (1940)
- Cortinarius subfusisporus Bon (1990)
- Cortinarius subgaleroides Rob. Henry (1991)
- Cortinarius subglandicolor Niskanen, Liimat. & Kytöv. (2017)
- Cortinarius subglaucopus Murrill (1939)
- Cortinarius subglobispermus Bidaud & Reumaux (2004)
- Cortinarius subglobisporus Murrill (1945)
- Cortinarius subheterocyclus Liimat., Niskanen & Kytöv. (2017)
- Cortinarius subhygrophanicus (M.M. Moser) M.M. Moser (1967)
- Cortinarius subiliopodius Bidaud & Moënne-Locc. (2013)
- Cortinarius subincarnatus Rob. Henry (1941)
- Cortinarius subinocyboides M.M. Moser (1975)
- Cortinarius subinsignis Reumaux (1988)
- Cortinarius subintentus Reumaux (2013)
- Cortinarius subiodolens Reumaux (2001)
- Cortinarius subionochlorus Rob. Henry (1952)
- Cortinarius subionophyllus Niskanen, Liimat. & Kytöv. (2017)
- Cortinarius subjuberinus Murrill (1939)
- Cortinarius sublanatorum Rob. Henry (1992)
- Cortinarius sublanatus (Sowerby) Fr. (1838)
- Cortinarius sublargus Cleland (1928) - Australia
- Cortinarius sublateritius Peck (1900)
- Cortinarius subleproleptopus Liimat., Niskanen & Bojantchev (2021)
- Cortinarius sublilacinus Murrill (1945)
- Cortinarius sublubricus (Jul. Schäff. ex M.M. Moser) M.M. Moser (1967)
- Cortinarius submarginalis Peck (1902)
- Cortinarius submelanotus Bidaud (2005)
- Cortinarius submeleagris Gasparini (2007)
- Cortinarius submilvinus Bidaud (2010)
- Cortinarius subminiatopus Kytöv., Niskanen & Liimat. (2017)
- Cortinarius subobtusobrunneus Bidaud (2004)
- Cortinarius subobtusus Kauffman & A.H. Sm. (1933)
- Cortinarius suboenochelis Kytöv., Liimat. & Niskanen (2011)
- Cortinarius subolivaceophyllus Rob. Henry (1976)
- Cortinarius subolivaceus Bidaud, Moënne-Locc. & Reumaux (2000)
- Cortinarius subolivellus Carteret & Reumaux (2009)
- Cortinarius suboliveocaninus Chevassut & Rob. Henry (1978)
- Cortinarius suboxytoneus Bidaud (2015)
- Cortinarius subpaleaceus Kytöv., Niskanen & Liimat. (2017)
- Cortinarius subparevernius Rob. Henry (1970)
- Cortinarius subparvannulatus Moënne-Locc. & Fillion (2010)
- Cortinarius subpateriformis Carteret (2013)
- Cortinarius subplumbosus Reumaux (2010)
- Cortinarius subpudorinus Reumaux (2008)
- Cortinarius subpuellaris Brandrud & Dima (2016)
- Cortinarius subpulchrifolius Kauffman (1918)
- Cortinarius subpulchripes Reumaux (1990)
- Cortinarius subpurpureus A.H. Sm. (1944)
- Cortinarius subradicatus Herp. (1912)
- Cortinarius subrepandus Melot (1989)
- Cortinarius subresectipes A. Delannoy, Eyssart. & Cheype (2008)
- Cortinarius subrhombisporus A. de Haan, Volders & Lenaerts (2013)
- Cortinarius subrigens Kauffman (1918)
- Cortinarius subrimosus A.H. Sm. & Hesler (1944)
- Cortinarius subrufulus Ammirati, Liimat. & Niskanen (2014)
- Cortinarius subrufus San-Fabian, Niskanen & Liimat. (2018)
- Cortinarius subsafranopes Rob. Henry (1956)
- Cortinarius subsalmoneus Kauffman (1907)
- Cortinarius subsanguineus T.Z. Wei, M.L. Xie & Y.J. Yao (2020)
- Cortinarius subsaniosus Liimat. & Niskanen (2020) – UK
- Cortinarius subsaturninus Rob. Henry (1938)
- Cortinarius subscandens Rob. Henry (1969)
- Cortinarius subscaurus (M.M. Moser) M.M. Moser (1967)
- Cortinarius subsciorophyllus Gasparini (2007)
- Cortinarius subscotoides Niskanen & Liimat. (2019)
- Cortinarius subsedens Rob. Henry (1956)
- Cortinarius subserratissimus Kytöv., Liimat. & Niskanen (2014)
- Cortinarius subsquamulosus (Batsch) Rob. Henry (1959)
- Cortinarius substriaepileus Melot (1995)
- Cortinarius substriatus Kauffman (1932)
- Cortinarius subsulcatipes Bidaud (2014)
- Cortinarius subtabularis Kauffman (1918)
- Cortinarius subtenuatus Carteret & Eyssartier (2008)
- Cortinarius subtestaceus A.H. Sm. (1942)
- Cortinarius subtigrinus Reumaux (1982)
- Cortinarius subtilior J. Favre (1955)
- Cortinarius subtilis Bendiksen & Brandrud (2015)
- Cortinarius subtomentosus Reumaux (1988)
- Cortinarius subtortus (Pers.) Zawadzki (1835)
- Cortinarius subtorvus Lamoure (1969)
- Cortinarius subtricolor Reumaux (2013)
- Cortinarius subturibulosus Kizlik & Trescol (1991)
- Cortinarius subumbilicatus Rob. Henry (1952)
- Cortinarius subumbrinus Chevassut & Rob. Henry (1982)
- Cortinarius subvaccinus Rob. Henry (1959)
- Cortinarius subvalidus Rob. Henry (1958)
- Cortinarius subvelatus (Rob. Henry) Bidaud & Moënne-Locc. (2008)
- Cortinarius subviolaceus Gasparini (2014)
- Cortinarius subviolascens Rob. Henry ex Nezdojm. (1983)
- Cortinarius subvirgatus Reumaux ex Carteret & Reumaux (2014)
- Cortinarius subvolvatus (Fayod) Sacc. & D. Sacc. (1905)
- Cortinarius succineus M.M. Moser (1991)
- Cortinarius suecicolor Soop (2003)
- Cortinarius suillonigrescens Rob. Henry ex Reumaux (2002)
- Cortinarius suilloviolascens Reumaux (2010)
- Cortinarius suillus Fr. (1838)
- Cortinarius sulcatipes Rob. Henry (1983)
- Cortinarius sulcatus Moënne-Locc. & Reumaux (2002)
- Cortinarius sulfurinodibaphus Chevassut & Rob. Henry (1994)
- Cortinarius sulphureomyceliatus M.M. Moser & E. Horak (1975)
- Cortinarius sulphureomyceliosus Svrček (1996)
- Cortinarius sulphureus Lindgr. (1845)
- Cortinarius suppariger M.M. Moser & E. Horak (1975)
- Cortinarius suratus Fr. (1838), (= Cortinarius delibutus)
- Cortinarius surreptus E. Horak (1980)
- Cortinarius sutherlandensis Liimat., D. Savage & Niskanen (2022)
- Cortinarius sylvae-norvegicae Høil. (1993)
- Cortinarius symeae (Bougher, Fuhrer & E. Horak) Peintner, E. Horak, M.M. Moser & Vilgalys (2002)
- Cortinarius sytnikii M.M. Moser (1996)

== T ==
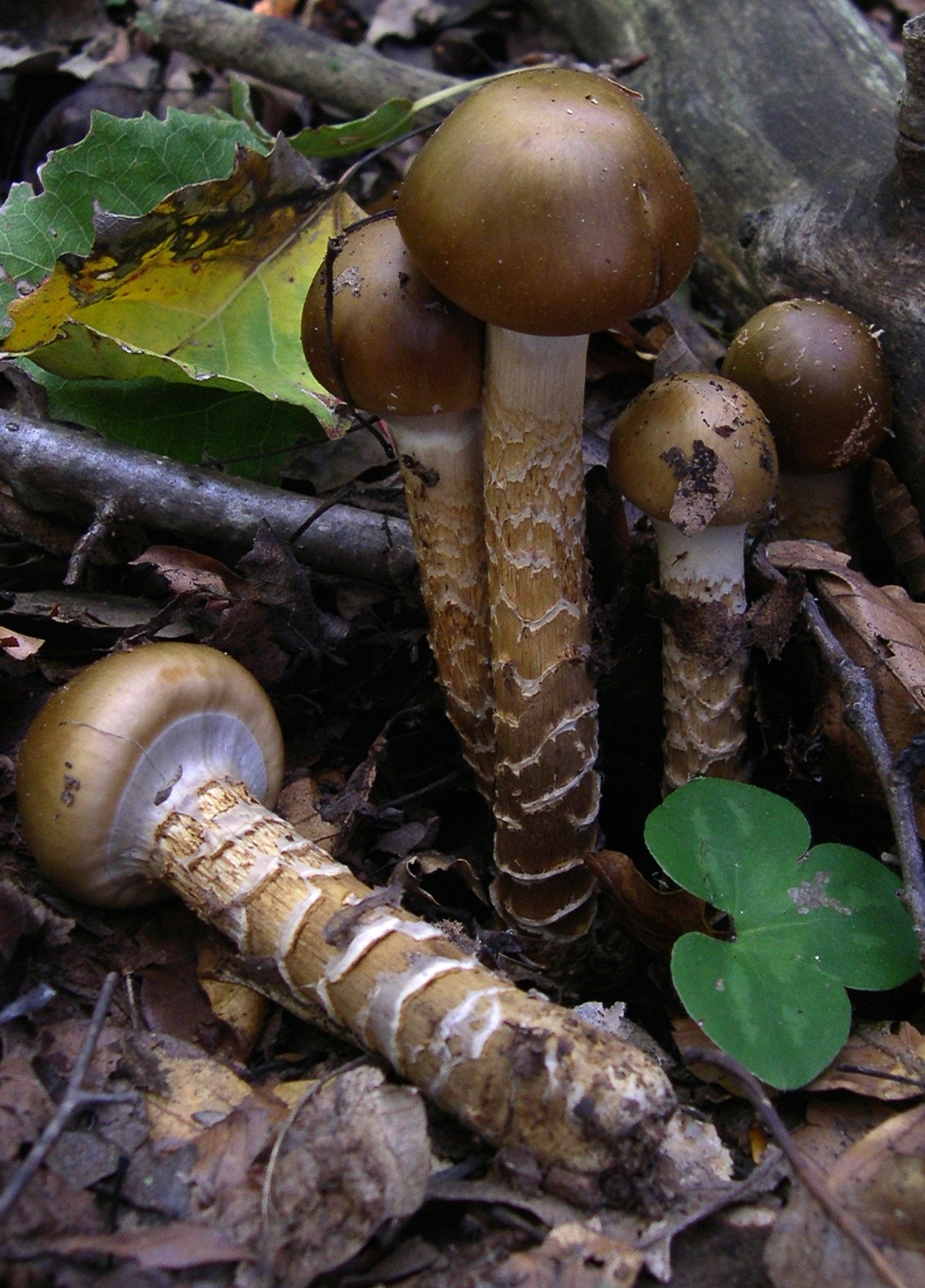
C. trivialis J.E.Lange 1940

- Cortinarius tabacinus P.D. Orton (1984)
- Cortinarius tabularis (Fr.) Fr. (1838)
- Cortinarius tacitus Bidaud & Carteret (2014)
- Cortinarius tammii (Fr.) Melot (2005)
- Cortinarius tarnensis Speg. (1887)
- Cortinarius tasmacamphoratus Gasparini (2008) – Australia
- Cortinarius tatrensis R. Fellner & Landa (1993)
- Cortinarius taylorianus E. Horak (1990) – New Zealand
- Cortinarius telamoniopsis Rob. Henry (1970)
- Cortinarius tenebricus J. Favre (1955)
- Cortinarius tenellus M.M. Moser (1975)
- Cortinarius tenneovelatus Corrales, Ovrebo, Ammirati, Dima & Liimat. (2022)
- Cortinarius tenuatus Rob. Henry (1970)
- Cortinarius tenuifulvescens Kytöv., Niskanen & Liimat. (2016)
- Cortinarius tenuis M.M. Moser (1975)
- Cortinarius tenuivestitus Bidaud (2013)
- Cortinarius tephrophyllus M.M. Moser (1975)
- Cortinarius teras Reumaux (1980)
- Cortinarius teraturgus M.M. Moser (1975)
- Cortinarius terebrinus E. Horak & M.M. Moser (1975)
- Cortinarius terebripes E. Horak (1980)
- Cortinarius teresae (Garrido) G. Garnier (1992)
- Cortinarius termutuans Rob. Henry (1992)
- Cortinarius terribilis Reumaux (2002) – France
- Cortinarius tessellatovariatus Rob. Henry (1989)
- Cortinarius tessellatus Rob. Henry (1981)
- Cortinarius tessiae Soop (2008) – New Zealand
- Cortinarius testaceofractus Carteret & Reumaux (2000) – France
- Cortinarius testaceomicaceus Bidaud (2014)
- Cortinarius testaceoviolascens Bidaud & Reumaux (2000) – France
- Cortinarius testicolor Bidaud, Carteret, Reumaux & Moënne-Locc. (2010)
- Cortinarius tetonensis Ammirati, Liimat., Niskanen & Dima (2021)
- Cortinarius thalliopallidus Rob. Henry (1976)
- Cortinarius thallioruber Chevassut & Rob. Henry (1982)
- Cortinarius thalliosubflavescens Rob. Henry (1995) – France
- Cortinarius thiersianus Peintner & M.M. Moser (2002) – US
- Cortinarius thiersii Ammirati & A.H. Sm. (1977) – edible, but deadly look-alikes (C. gentilis)
- Cortinarius thyoneus E. Horak (1980)
- Cortinarius tiffanyae Healy, Ammirati & Liimat. (2020)
- Cortinarius tigrellus Soop (2003)
- Cortinarius tigrinipes Bergeron (1997)
- Cortinarius tiliaceus N. Arnold (1993)
- Cortinarius tillamookensis Ammirati, Liimat. & Niskanen (2014)
- Cortinarius timiskamingensis Malloch, Ammirati, Liimat. & Niskanen (2014)
- Cortinarius tinctorum Bidaud & Carteret (2016)
- Cortinarius togularis E. Horak (1975)
- Cortinarius tomasii Melot (1992)
- Cortinarius torquatorum Rob. Henry (1989)
- Cortinarius tortipes Moënne-Locc. & Reumaux (1997)
- Cortinarius tortuosus (Fr.) Fr. (1838)
- Cortinarius torvoides Rob. Henry (2000)
- Cortinarius torvus (Fr.) Fr. (1838)
- Cortinarius trachyspermus M.M. Moser (1975)
- Cortinarius traganus (Fr.) Fr. (1838) – gassy webcap (Europe)
- Cortinarius transatlanticus Ammirati, Liimat. & Niskanen (2014)
- Cortinarius transiens (Melot) Soop (1990)
- Cortinarius translucidus N. Pastor & Nouhra (2019)
- Cortinarius trappei Ammirati, Liimat. & Niskanen (2014)
- Cortinarius trechisporus E. Horak (1975)
- Cortinarius tremulinus (Velen.) Rob. Henry (1996)
- Cortinarius trescolii Rob. Henry (1981)
- Cortinarius triangulus Rob. Henry (1983)
- Cortinarius trichocarpus Soop (2016)
- Cortinarius tricholomoides M.M. Moser (1975)
- Cortinarius tricognandus Rob. Henry (1943)
- Cortinarius triformis Fr. (1838)
- Cortinarius tristis E. Horak (1975)
- Cortinarius trivialis J.E. Lange (1940)
- Cortinarius trongolensis Garrido (1988)
- Cortinarius trossingenensis Melot (1981)
- Cortinarius truckeensis Bojantchev (2013) – North America (Truckee, California)
- Cortinarius truncatoides M.M. Moser (1975)
- Cortinarius tubarius Ammirati & A.H. Sm. (1972)
- Cortinarius tubercularis (Bougher & A.A. Francis) Gasparini (2014)
- Cortinarius tubulosus Bidaud (2014)
- Cortinarius tucumanensis M.M. Moser (1975)
- Cortinarius tugurium Liimat. & Niskanen (2022)
- Cortinarius tumidipes M.M. Moser (1975)
- Cortinarius tundrae Speg. (1887)
- Cortinarius tuolumnensis Bojantchev (2013) – North America
- Cortinarius turbinatoides Consiglio, D. Antonini & M. Antonini (2004) – Italy
- Cortinarius turbinatus (Bull.) Fr. (1838)
- Cortinarius turbinoides Kauffman (1907)
- Cortinarius turbobasalis E. Horak (1995)
- Cortinarius turcicus (Lasch) Bidaud, Moënne-Locc. & Reumaux (1997)
- Cortinarius turgidipes Rob. Henry ex Bidaud & Carteret (2008)
- Cortinarius turgidulus Bidaud (2002) – France
- Cortinarius turgidus Fr. (1838)
- Cortinarius turibulosus (Jul. Schäff. & E. Horak) Bon & G. Garnier (1991)
- Cortinarius turpis E. Horak (1975)
- Cortinarius tylostomatoides (Singer) Peintner & M.M. Moser (2002)
- Cortinarius tympanicus (E. Horak) Peintner & M.M. Moser (2002)

== U ==
- Cortinarius udolivascens Rob. Henry (1990)
- Cortinarius ulematus Gasparini (2007) – Australia (Tasmania)
- Cortinarius uliginobadius Rob. Henry (1981)
- Cortinarius uliginobtusus Rob. Henry (1941)
- Cortinarius uliginosus Berk. (1860)
- Cortinarius ultimiionophyllus Kytöv., Niskanen & Liimat. (2017)
- Cortinarius ultrodistortus Rob. Henry & Vagnet (1992)
- Cortinarius umbilicatus P. Karst. (1893)
- Cortinarius umbonatoides Moënne-Locc. & Reumaux (2008)
- Cortinarius umbonatus (Velen.) Rob. Henry (1947)
- Cortinarius umbrinobellus Liimat., Niskanen & Kytöv. (2014)
- Cortinarius umbrinocarneus M.M. Moser (1975)
- Cortinarius umbrinoclarus Rob. Henry (1984)
- Cortinarius umbrinocoerulescens (Röhl.) Melot (2017)
- Cortinarius umbrinofoliatus Rob. Henry (1968)
- Cortinarius umbrinolens P.D. Orton (1980)
- Cortinarius umbrinolutescens Reumaux (2004)
- Cortinarius umbrinomammosus Rob. Henry (2003) – France
- Cortinarius undantipes Rob. Henry (1969)
- Cortinarius undulatofibrillosus Pilát ex A. Favre (1997) – Czech Republic
- Cortinarius ungularis E. Horak & M.M. Moser (1975)
- Cortinarius unimodus Britzelm. (1885)
- Cortinarius uraceisporus Niskanen, Kytöv. & Liimat. (2014)
- Cortinarius uraceomajalis Dima, Liimat., Niskanen & Bojantchev (2014)
- Cortinarius uraceonemoralis Niskanen, Liimat., Dima, Kytöv., Bojantchev & H. Lindstr. (2014)
- Cortinarius uraceoroseus Bidaud, Carteret & Reumaux (2013)
- Cortinarius uraceovernus Rob. Henry ex A. Favre & Vialard (2008)
- Cortinarius uraceus Fr. (1838)
- Cortinarius urbicus (Fr.) Fr. (1838)
- Cortinarius urbis-veteris Cleric., Boccardo & Dovana (2023)
- Cortinarius ursus Soop (2001) – New Zealand
- Cortinarius uxorum J. Ballarà, R. Mahiques & I. Garrido-Benavent (2019)

== V ==
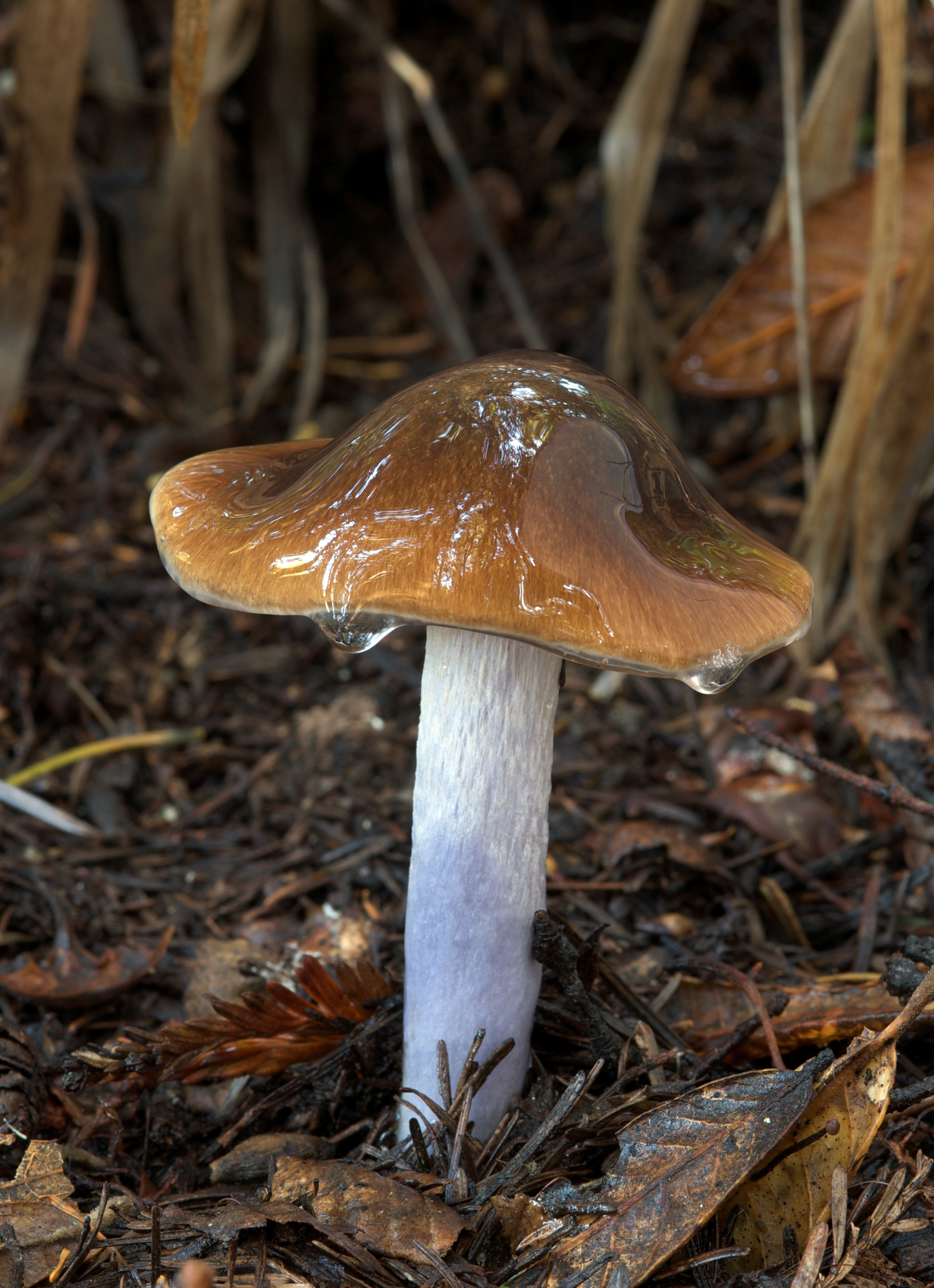
C. vanduzerensis A.H.Sm. & Trappe 1972

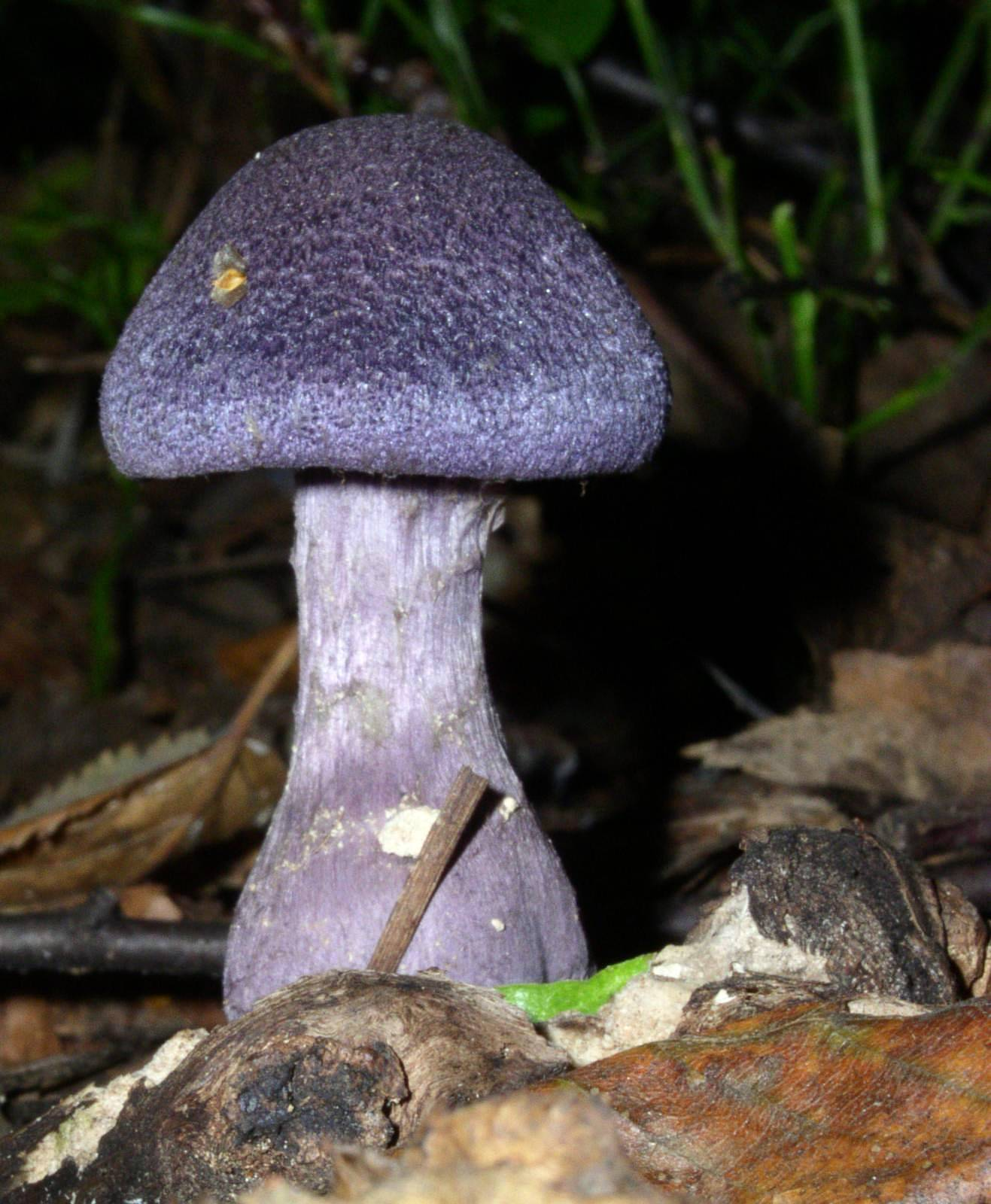
C. violaceus (L. 1753) Gray 1821

- Cortinarius vaccinochelis Chevassut & Rob. Henry (1978) – France
- Cortinarius vaccinus Rob. Henry (1959) – France
- Cortinarius vagabundus Liimat. & Niskanen (2021)
- Cortinarius vaginatopus Bidaud, Moënne-Locc. & Reumaux (1993) – France
- Cortinarius vagnetoi Rob. Henry (1986) – France
- Cortinarius valgus Fr. (1838)
- Cortinarius vandervekenianus Verstr. & Gelderblom (2013)
- Cortinarius vanduzerensis A.H. Sm. & Trappe (1972)
- Cortinarius variebulbus Chevassut & Rob. Henry (1982) – France
- Cortinarius variecolor (Pers.) Fr. (1838) – Europe
- Cortinarius variegatuloides Remaux (1995) – France
- Cortinarius variegatulus M.M. Moser (1975) – Argentina
- Cortinarius variipes Rob. Henry (1977) – France
- Cortinarius varius (Schaeff.) Fr. (1838)
- Cortinarius velatocaulis Rob. Henry (1986) – France
- Cortinarius velatus Thiers & A.H. Sm. (1969)
- Cortinarius velenovskyanus Moënne-Locc. & Reumaux (1997) – France
- Cortinarius vellingae Bojantchev, Ammirati, Garnica & Beug (2015)
- Cortinarius velutinellus Singer (1949) – northern European Russia
- Cortinarius veneto-occidentalis Niskanen, Liimat. & Ammirati (2021)
- Cortinarius venetus (Fr.) Fr. (1838)
- Cortinarius venosifolius Bidaud, Moënne-Locc. & Reumaux (1993) – France
- Cortinarius venosus A.E. Johnson (1878)
- Cortinarius ventricosus M.M. Moser (2002) – US (Wyoming)
- Cortinarius venustissimus Bidaud (2002) – Sweden
- Cortinarius venustus P. Karst. (1878)
- Cortinarius verallopus Rob. Henry & Ramm (1991) – France
- Cortinarius veraprilis Chevassut, Rob. Henry & G. Riousset (1986)
- Cortinarius verecundus E. Horak (1990) – New Caledonia
- Cortinarius veregregius Rob. Henry (1938) – France
- Cortinarius vernalis Peck (1872)
- Cortinarius vernalishastensis Bojantchev, Ammirati, Niskanen & Liimat. (2017)
- Cortinarius vernalisierraensis Bojantchev, Ammirati, Niskanen & Liimat. (2017)
- Cortinarius vernicosus M.T. Seidl (2000) – US (Washington)
- Cortinarius vernus H. Lindstr. & Melot (1994) – Sweden
- Cortinarius verona-brunneus Cleland & J.R. Harris (1948)
- Cortinarius veronicae Soop (1998) – New Zealand
- Cortinarius veronicoides Gasparini (2008) – Australia
- Cortinarius verruculosus (Murrill) Singer (1951)
- Cortinarius versicolor A. Blytt (1904)
- Cortinarius versicolorum Rob. Henry (1976)
- Cortinarius vestitipes Bellanger & Reumaux (2013)
- Cortinarius vicinus Bidaud, Consiglio, D. Antonini & M. Antonini (2005)
- Cortinarius vicus Liimat., Danhao Wang & Niskanen (2022)
- Cortinarius vienoi Kokkonen (2020)
- Cortinarius vikingus Liimat., Danhao Wang, D. Savage & Niskanen (2022)
- Cortinarius vinaceobrunneus Ammirati, Beug, Liimat., Niskanen & O. Ceska (2016)
- Cortinarius vinaceocinereus Cleland (1928)
- Cortinarius vinaceogrisescens Ammirati, Beug, Liimat. & Niskanen (2016)
- Cortinarius vinaceolamellatus Cleland (1933)
- Cortinarius vinaceomaculatus M.M. Moser (1975)
- Cortinarius vinicolor (E. Horak) Garnier (1992)
- Cortinarius vinosipes Gasparini (2001)
- Cortinarius violaceobrunneus Corrales, Ovrebo, Ammirati, Dima & Liimat. (2022)
- Cortinarius violaceocalcarius Rob. Henry (1952)
- Cortinarius violaceocystidiatus A.R. Nilsen & Orlovich (2020) – New Zealand
- Cortinarius violaceofuscus (Cooke & Massee) Massee (1904)
- Cortinarius violaceohinnuleus Cleland & J.R. Harris (1948)
- Cortinarius violaceo-hinnuleus Cleland & J.R. Harris (1948)
- Cortinarius violaceo-olivaceus M.M. Moser (1975)
- Cortinarius violaceopapillatus Bidaud (2010)
- Cortinarius violaceovalens Chevassut & Rob. Henry (1982)
- Cortinarius violaceovolvatus (E. Horak) Peintner & M.M. Moser (2002)
- Cortinarius violaceus (L.) Gray (1821) – purple cortinar (Europe), violet cort (North America)
- Cortinarius violaeodor Rob. Henry (1985)
- Cortinarius violaeolens Carteret & Reumaux (2010)
- Cortinarius violascens (A. Blytt) Sacc. (1912)
- Cortinarius violeipes M.M. Moser (1975)
- Cortinarius violeovelatus Lamoure (1977)
- Cortinarius violilamellatus A. Pearson ex P.D. Orton (1984)
- Cortinarius virgatocephalus Bidaud (2014)
- Cortinarius virgatus Peck (1895)
- Cortinarius virgineus E. Horak & M.M. Moser (1975)
- Cortinarius viridans Bellanger & Loizides (2021) – Cyprus
- Cortinarius viridiflavus Ammirati, Bojantchev, Liimat. & Niskanen (2014)
- Cortinarius viridipes M.M. Moser (1967)
- Cortinarius viridipileatus X. Yue Wang, M.C. Te Tana, A.R. Nilsen & Orlovich (2021) – New Zealand
- Cortinarius viridoalbus Ramm & Rob. Henry (1995)
- Cortinarius viridulifolius M.M. Moser (1975)
- Cortinarius viscibadius Murrill (1945)
- Cortinarius viscostriatus E. Horak (1990)
- Cortinarius viscovenetus E. Horak (1975)
- Cortinarius viscoviridis E. Horak (1990)
- Cortinarius vitellinopes Secr. ex J. Schröt. (1889)
- Cortinarius vitiosus (M.M. Moser) Niskanen, Kytöv., Liimat. & S. Laine (2012)
- Cortinarius vitreofulvus Soop (2016)
- Cortinarius vitreopallidus Soop (2021)
- Cortinarius vitreopileatus E. Horak (1990)
- Cortinarius vittatus E. Horak (1995)
- Cortinarius voluptatis Salgado Salomón & Peintner (2021)
- Cortinarius volvatus A.H. Sm. (1939)
- Cortinarius volvosuberis Chevassut & Rob. Henry (1994)
- Cortinarius vulpicolor M.M. Moser & McKnight (1987)

== W ==
- Cortinarius wahkiacus Ammirati, Beug, Liimat. & Niskanen (2016)
- Cortinarius waiporianus Soop (2013)
- Cortinarius wakullaensis Niskanen & Liimat. (2021)
- Cortinarius walkeri Cooke & Massee (1893)
- Cortinarius wallacei Soop (2014)
- Cortinarius walpolensis A.A. Francis & Bougher (2004) – Australia
- Cortinarius watamukiensis Hongo (1962)
- Cortinarius watsonii Murrill (1945)
- Cortinarius weberi Murrill (1945)
- Cortinarius weberianus Singer (1951)
- Cortinarius westii Murrill (1939)
- Cortinarius whiteae Peck (1902)
- Cortinarius wirrabara Gasparini (2007) – Australia (Tasmania)

== X ==
- Cortinarius xantheuodes Rob. Henry (1992)
- Cortinarius xanthocephaloides A.I. Ivanov (1988)
- Cortinarius xanthocephalus P.D. Orton (1960)
- Cortinarius xanthocholus E. Horak & M.M. Moser (1975)
- Cortinarius xantholamellatus Bidaud (2005)
- Cortinarius xantholilacinus Eyssart. & Reumaux (2000)
- Cortinarius xanthophylloides Reumaux (2004)
- Cortinarius xanthopus M.M. Moser (1975)
- Cortinarius xanthosarx Vila, A. Ortega, Bidaud & Suár.-Sant. (2009)
- Cortinarius xenosma Soop (2003)
- Cortinarius xenosmatoides Soop (2016)
- Cortinarius xerampelinus E. Horak (1975)
- Cortinarius xerophilus Rob. Henry & Contu (1986)
- Cortinarius xiaojinensis T.Z. Wei, M.L. Xie & Y.J. Yao (2020)
- Cortinarius xylochroma E. Horak (1975)
- Cortinarius xylocinnamomeus M.M. Moser (1975)

== Y ==
- Cortinarius yerillus Grgur. (1997) – Australia (New South Wales)

== Z ==
- Cortinarius zakii Ammirati & A.H. Sm. (1977) – edible, but deadly look-alikes (C. gentilis)
- Cortinarius zinziberatus (Scop.) Fr. (1838)
- Cortinarius zonatus Reumaux (2005) – France
- Cortinarius zosteroides P.D. Orton (1983) – United Kingdom
