= Triumphans =

Triumphans may refer to:

- Cortinarius triumphans is a basidiomycete mushroom of the genus Cortinarius found in Europe
- Ecclesia Triumphans is a term of Christian ecclesiology which comprises those Catholics who are in Heaven.
- Juditha triumphans is an oratorio by Antonio Vivaldi.
