= Phlegmacium subrubrovelatum =

Scientific classification
- Kingdom: Fungi
- Division: Basidiomycota
- Class: Agaricomycetes
- Order: Agaricales
- Family: Cortinariaceae
- Genus: Phlegmacium
- Species: P. subrubrovelatum

Binomial name
- Phlegmacium subrubrovelatum (Bidaud) Niskanen & Liimat. (2022)

Synonyms
- Cortinarius subrubrovelatus (Bidaud) Kytöv., Liimat., Niskanen & Dima (2014); Cortinarius glaucopus var. subrubrovelatus Bidaud (2008)

Species of fungus

Phlegmacium subrubrovelatum is a species of mushroom producing fungus in the family Cortinariaceae. It was previously known as Cortinarius subrubrovelatus.

== Taxonomy ==
It was described as new to science in 2008 as a variety of another Cortinarius species, Cortinarius glaucopus var. subrubrovelatus but raised to distinct species status in 2014. It was classified as Cortinarius subrubrovelatus and placed in the subgenus Phlegmacium of the large mushroom genus Cortinarius.

In 2022 the species was transferred from Cortinarius and reclassified as Phlegmacium subrubrovelatum based on genomic data. This study also reclassified Cortinarius glaucopus as Phlegmacium glaucopus.

== Habitat and distribution ==
The mushroom is found in Central and northern Europe, where it grows in coniferous forests.
