= Phlegmacium caesiocolor =

Scientific classification
- Kingdom: Fungi
- Division: Basidiomycota
- Class: Agaricomycetes
- Order: Agaricales
- Family: Cortinariaceae
- Genus: Phlegmacium
- Species: P. caesiocolor

Binomial name
- Phlegmacium caesiocolor (Kytöv., Liimat. & Niskanen) Niskanen & Liimat. (2022)

Synonyms
- Cortinarius caesiocolor Kytöv., Liimat. & Niskanen (2014)

Species of fungus

Phlegmacium caesiocolor is a species of mushroom-forming fungus in the family Cortinariaceae. First described in 2014 as Cortinarius caesiocolor, it was later reclassified in 2022 based on molecular data. The specific name caesiocolor refers to the distinctive bluish-violet to violet-brown colouration of its cap, which measures 5–9 cm in width. The mushroom features closely spaced gills that change from pale greyish-brown with bluish tints to pale brown as they mature, and a whitish stem with subtle bluish tints. Its flesh displays blue colouration throughout or in patches, particularly near the gills, and turns yellow when treated with potassium hydroxide solution. This fungus is found in southern Finland, where it grows in deciduous forests, along roadsides, and in parks, typically associated with oak, poplar, and hazel trees on calcareous soil.

== Taxonomy ==
The fungus was originally described in 2014 by the mycologists Ilkka Kytövuori, Kare Liimatainen and Tuula Niskanen, who classified it as Cortinarius caesiocolor. The specific epithet refers to the bluish-violet colour of the cap. The holotype specimen was collected in Finland, in the Tamminiemi area of Jalassaari, Lohja, within the Uusimaa region. It was found on 27 August 2000, by I. Kytövuori (collection number 00-029) growing by a track on calcareous soil in a mixed deciduous forest containing birch (Betula), aspen (Populus tremula), oak (Quercus), hazel (Corylus), and goat willow (Salix caprea). The holotype is housed at the University of Helsinki herbarium (H). It was placed in the (subgenus Phlegmacium) of the large mushroom genus Cortinarius.

In 2022 the species was transferred from Cortinarius and reclassified as Phlegmacium caesiocolor based on molecular data.

== Description ==
The cap (pileus) of Phlegmacium caesiocolor measures 5–9 cm in width and develops from hemispherical to convex, eventually becoming flattened-convex. It has a slightly sticky surface with natural fibrous patterns that become more pronounced toward the margin. The cap displays a bluish-violet to violet-brown colouration. The gills (lamellae) are notched where they meet the stem, closely spaced, and undergo a colour transformation from pale greyish-brown with bluish tints when young to pale brown or brown as they mature.

The stem (stipe) is 6–10 cm long, measuring 1–2 cm thick at its top and widening to 2–3.5 cm at its base, giving it a club-like shape. It appears primarily whitish with subtle bluish tints at the apex. The universal veil (the protective tissue covering the immature fruiting body) is initially pale blue before transforming to brown, and is present in sparse amounts.

The flesh (context) displays blue colouration throughout or may be partially whitish while maintaining blue areas near the gills. The fungus has no distinctive odour. When potassium hydroxide (KOH) solution is applied to the flesh, it produces a yellow reaction. Dried herbarium specimens (Latin: specimina exsiccata) appear pale greyish-brown to violet-brown in the cap region, with the stem showing pale greyish-brown colouration that darkens to brown at the base.

Microscopically, the spores measure approximately 9.9 micrometre (μm) in length by 5.8 μm in width, with a ratio of length to width averaging 1.70. They have a weakly lemon-shaped appearance, sometimes featuring a slight depression on the side facing the attachment point. The spores are dark-coloured, moderately reactive with Melzer's reagent (dextrinoid), and distinctly warty with interconnected surface projections. The spore-producing cells (basidia) measure 30–41 μm by 7.5–9.0 μm, are club-shaped with four spores each, and contain reddish-brown pigmentation often with red particles.

The cap's outer layer (pileipellis) consists of a weakly gelatinous upper section with narrow hyphae (fungal filaments) measuring 2–4 μm wide, showing spiral surface decorations but generally lacking large reddish-brown particles. The lower hyphae are wider, measuring up to 8 μm, and contain small brown granular structures.

== Habitat and distribution ==
Phlegmacium caesiocolor is found in southern Finland, where it grows with oak, poplar, and hazel in deciduous forests, roadsides, and parks. P. chromataphilum is a sister species.

== See also ==
- List of Cortinarius species
