= Phlegmacium brunneiaurantium =

Scientific classification
- Domain: Eukaryota
- Kingdom: Fungi
- Division: Basidiomycota
- Class: Agaricomycetes
- Order: Agaricales
- Family: Cortinariaceae
- Genus: Phlegmacium
- Species: P. brunneiaurantium

Binomial name
- Phlegmacium brunneiaurantium (Kytöv., Liimat. & Niskanen) Niskanen & Liimat. (2022)

Synonyms
- Cortinarius brunneiaurantius Kytöv., Liimat. & Niskanen (2014)

Species of fungus

Phlegmacium brunneiaurantium is a species of mushroom-forming fungus in the family Cortinariaceae, endemic to southern Finland. First described scientifically in 2014 and originally placed in the genus Cortinarius, it was reassigned to Phlegmacium in 2022 following DNA-based analyses. The fungus produces mushrooms with medium-sized caps coloured in shades of ochre to pale brown, initially dome-shaped and sticky but becoming flatter and drier with age. It grows on nutrient-rich clay soils among broadleaf trees such as lime and oak, typically fruiting in autumn.

== Taxonomy ==
The fungus was originally described in 2014 by the mycologists Ilkka Kytövuori, Kare Liimatainen and Tuula Niskanen, who classified it as Cortinarius brunneiaurantium. It was placed in the (subgenus Phlegmacium) of the large mushroom genus Cortinarius. The type specimen was from the Kansanpuisto area of Ruissalo, Turku, in the region of Varsinais-Suomi (Finland). It was found along an alley of Tilia trees, with nearby specimens of Quercus robur, growing on soil described as clayey mull.

In 2022 the species was transferred from Cortinarius and reclassified as Phlegmacium brunneiaurantium based on molecular data.

== Description ==
The cap of Phlegmacium brunneiaurantium measures between 4 and 9 cm across. Initially shaped as a hemisphere, it gradually becomes flattened and convex with maturity. Its surface starts off somewhat sticky (viscid) but soon dries, developing small, flattened scales near the centre, while becoming finely fibrous (fibrillose) closer to the edge. The cap colour is a pale ochre-brown. Underneath the cap, the gills (lamellae) are crowded closely together and attach to the stem with a notch-like indentation (emarginate). Initially, they appear bluish or pale grey, transitioning later to a pale brown shade.

The stem (stipe) ranges from 4 to 9 cm in height, and its thickness varies between 0.8 and 1.5 cm near the top, widening gradually to between 1.2 and 2 cm at its base, resulting in a club-shaped (clavate) appearance. Its colour shifts from white when young to pale brown as it ages. A universal veil—a protective layer of tissue enveloping young mushrooms—is present but rather sparse, initially white and quickly turning brownish. Internally, the mushroom tissue (context) appears white within the cap and typically bluish within the upper stem. No distinct odour has been noted. A chemical reaction occurs when applying potassium hydroxide (KOH) solution to the tissue, producing a yellow colour. In dried specimens, the cap colouration changes to shades ranging from orange-brown or darker brown centrally to a paler yellowish-brown along its edges, and the stem is pale brown.

The spores, when observed under a microscope in a chemical medium called Melzer's reagent, measure about 8.2–9.7 by 4.8–5.4 micrometre (μm), averaging around 8.9 by 5.2 μm. Their shape resembles an almond or lemon (amygdaloid to citriform), featuring a shallow depression at one end (suprahilar depression). They have a moderately to prominently roughened surface (verrucose), covered with dark warts that react moderately to dextrinoid (staining reddish-brown) and are frequently very darkly coloured.

Microscopic examination reveals that the spore-producing structures, called basidia, are club-shaped, sand-brown, measure 30–38 by 7–8 μm, and produce spores in groups of four. The inner structure (trama) of the gills contains hyphae (fungal filaments) filled with dark small granules embedded in a blood-red substance or larger granules against a greenish-grey background. At the top of the stem, hyphae appear bright yellow, some bearing granules and chip-like inclusions. Those closest to the surface contain darker pigments ranging from yellowish to reddish-brown with near-black, blood-coloured contents.

The cap surface (pileipellis) is structurally simple, predominantly orange-red overall. Its upper hyphae, measuring 4–8 μm in width, have clearly defined spiral wall encrustations and contain occasional dark granular accumulations. Lower hyphae are broader, appear yellower, smoother, and contain abundant dark granular substances. No distinct hypodermal layer (hypoderm) is present.

== Habitat and distribution ==
Phlegmacium brunneiaurantium is found only in south Finland, where it grows in deciduous forests and fruits in autumn. Close relatives include C. sobrius, C. balteatus, C. brunneoviolaceus, C. pseudonaeovosus and C. clarobaltoides var. longispermus.
