= Phlegmacium subfoetidum =

Scientific classification
- Kingdom: Fungi
- Division: Basidiomycota
- Class: Agaricomycetes
- Order: Agaricales
- Family: Cortinariaceae
- Genus: Phlegmacium
- Species: P. subfoetidum

Binomial name
- Phlegmacium subfoetidum (A.H.Sm.) Niskanen & Liimat. (2022)

Synonyms
- Cortinarius subfoetidus A.H.Sm. (1944) Cortinarius subfoetidus var. bubalinovelatus M.M.Moser & Ammirati (1999)

Species of fungus

Phlegmacium subfoetidum in Granite Pass, Kaniksu National Forest, Pend Oreille Co., Washington, USA

Phlegmacium subfoetidum, commonly known as the aromatic lavender webcap, is a species of mushroom producing fungus in the family Cortinariaceae. It was previously known as Cortinarius subfoetidus.

== Taxonomy ==
It was described as new to science in 1944 by American mycologist Alexander H. Smith who classified it as Cortinarius subfoetidus. It was placed in Cortinarius (subgenus Phlegmacium).

In 1999 Meinhard Michael Moser and Joe Ammirati published the variety Cortinarius subfoetidus var. bubalinovelatus.

In 2022 the species was transferred from Cortinarius and reclassified as Phlegmacium subfoetidum based on genomic data.

== Description ==
The mushroom cap is 3–10 cm wide, convex to flat (sometime umbonate), lavender to pinkish, bluish in age, slimy, smooth, with a fruity odor. The gills are adnate to notched, lilac then brown as the spores mature. The stalk is 5–10 cm tall and 1–2 cm wide, equal or clavate.

Its edibility is unknown, but it is not recommended due to its similarity to deadly poisonous species.

Similar species include Cortinarius griseoviolaceus and C. traganus.

== Habitat and distribution ==
Phlegmacium subfoetidum
- Mycological characteristics
- Gills on hymenium
- Cap is umbonate or convex
- Hymenium is adnexed
- Stipe has a cortina
- Spore print is brown
- Ecology is mycorrhizal
- Edibility is unknown

Found in the Pacific Northwest region of the United States and Canada.

== See also ==
- List of Cortinarius species
