= Phlegmacium boreidionysae =

Scientific classification
- Kingdom: Fungi
- Division: Basidiomycota
- Class: Agaricomycetes
- Order: Agaricales
- Family: Cortinariaceae
- Genus: Phlegmacium
- Species: P. boreidionysae

Binomial name
- Phlegmacium boreidionysae (Kytöv., Liimat., Niskanen & Dima) Niskanen & Liimat. (2022)

Synonyms
- Cortinarius boreidionysae Kytöv., Liimat., Niskanen & Dima (2014)

Species of fungus

Phlegmacium boreidionysae is a rare species of mushroom-forming fungus in the family Cortinariaceae. Originally described in 2014 as a member of the genus Cortinarius, it was reclassified in 2022 based on genomic data. The specific epithet alludes to both its relationship to Cortinarius dionysae and its northern distribution. The species is characterised by its mustard to cocoa brown cap with a silky centre, gills that transition from violaceous to pale brownish grey, and a stem with a distinctive marginate bulb that changes from pale violet to yellowish with age. This fungus has only been documented in the boreal forests of Finland, where it grows in spruce-dominated woodlands on calcareous soil.

== Taxonomy ==
The fungus was originally described in 2014 by the mycologists Ilkka Kytövuori, Kare Liimatainen, Tuula Niskanen, and Balint Dima who classified it as Cortinarius boreidionysae. The type specimen was collected on 11 September 1997, by I. Kytövuori (collection number 97-1220) in Raemäki, Peura, within the Tervola municipality in the Peräpohjola region of Finland. The holotype specimen is preserved in the herbarium of the University of Helsinki (H), with an isotype (duplicate specimen) housed in the New York Botanical Garden herbarium (NY). The specific epithet boreidionysae refers to its close relationship to C. dionysae, and its boreal distribution. It was placed in the (subgenus Phlegmacium) of the large mushroom genus Cortinarius.

In 2022 the species was transferred from Cortinarius and reclassified as Phlegmacium boreidionysae based on genomic data.

== Description ==
The cap (pileus) measures 5–10 cm in width, initially hemispherical to convex before expanding with age. Its surface is sticky and slimy (glutinous) with an innately fibrous appearance. The colouration ranges from mustard brown to cocoa brown, featuring a somewhat silky, shining centre and olive-yellowish tint at the margin when young. The gills (lamellae) are notched where they meet the stem (emarginate) and densely arranged (crowded). Their colour transitions from violaceous in young specimens to violet grey and finally pale brownish grey as the mushroom matures.

The stem (stipe) measures 3–9 cm in length and 1–1.8 cm in thickness at the top, widening to 2–2.5 cm at the base. It features a distinctive bulb with a clearly defined edge (marginate bulb). Young specimens display a pale violaceous stem that gradually becomes yellowish with age. The universal veil, a protective tissue that covers the immature fruiting body, appears yellow at the margin of the bulb.

The flesh (context) varies in colour depending on its location: white in the cap, violaceous in the stem, and initially whitish in the bulb before developing a brownish-yellowish tint. The fungus has a faint flour-like (farinaceous) odour. Dried herbarium specimens (Latin: specimina exsiccata) exhibit a uniformly orange-brown cap, sometimes with a faint greyish tint, and a somewhat paler stem.

Under microscopic examination with Melzer's reagent, the spores measure 8.4–10.2 by 5.2–6.1 micrometres (μm) (average 9.3 by 5.8 μm). The spores are strongly lemon-shaped (citriform) with a pronounced beak-like projection. Their surface is moderately covered with sharp wart-like protrusions (verrucose), often containing small coloured droplets (guttules). When exposed to iodine, they show a faint to moderate reddish-brown reaction (faintly to moderately dextrinoid).

The basidia (spore-producing structures) measure 23–32 by 7–9 μm, bear four spores each, and are club-shaped. Some basidia contain brownish-yellow, foamy contents. The tissue between the gills (lamellar trama) contains thread-like structures (hyphae) that appear yellow and granular-guttulate, though they lack the blood-red droplets found in some related species.

The hyphae at the stem apex appear yellowish to yellow with smooth surfaces, containing golden yellow small drops and abundant large, blood-red, worm-like droplets in the outermost hyphae. The outer layer of the cap (pileipellis) has a strongly gelatinous surface layer (epicutis). The uppermost hyphae measure 3–11 μm in width and are mostly densely and spirally encrusted with small to large blood-red droplets. Lower down, there is a thick layer of somewhat wider hyphae filled with small to very large, worm-like, foamy, blood-red droplets. The cap has a well-developed layer of differentiated cells beneath the pileipellis (hypoderm) that appears yellow to reddish-brownish.

== Habitat and distribution ==
Found in Finland, it grows in northern boreal forests of predominantly Norway spruce (Picea abies). The type specimen was found growing in a grass-herb-spruce forest with spring-fed depressions on calcareous soil.
