= Phlegmacium calyptratum =

Scientific classification
- Kingdom: Fungi
- Division: Basidiomycota
- Class: Agaricomycetes
- Order: Agaricales
- Family: Cortinariaceae
- Genus: Phlegmacium
- Species: P. calyptratum

Binomial name
- Phlegmacium calyptratum A.H. Sm. Niskanen and Liimat.

Synonyms
- Cortinarius calyptratus A.H. Sm.

Species of fungus

Phlegmacium calyptratum Mycological characteristics
- Gills on hymenium
- Cap is convex or flat
- Hymenium is adnate
- Stipe has a cortina
- Spore print is reddish-brown
- Ecology is mycorrhizal
- Edibility is unknown

Phlegmacium calyptratum, formerly known as Cortinarius calyptratus, is a species of mushroom in the family Cortinariaceae. It is rare.

== Description ==
The cap of Phlegmacium calyptratum is purple in color and grayer in older specimens. It starts out round and becomes convex or flat. The bulbous stipe is about 5-7.3 centimeters long, 1.1-1.5 centimeters wide at the top, and 1.8-2.5 centimeters wide at its widest point. It can be purplish or gray, and a cortina is present. The gills start out purplish to grayish and become brown as they mature.

== Habitat and ecology ==
Phlegmacium calyptratum is found in old-growth forests in the Cascades and the Coast Range. It grows under conifers and fruits during fall.
