= Phlegmacium cremeiamarescens =

Scientific classification
- Kingdom: Fungi
- Division: Basidiomycota
- Class: Agaricomycetes
- Order: Agaricales
- Family: Cortinariaceae
- Genus: Phlegmacium
- Species: P. cremeiamarescens

Binomial name
- Phlegmacium cremeiamarescens (Kytöv., Liimat. & Niskanen) Niskanen & Liimat. (2022)

Synonyms
- Cortinarius cremeiamarescens Kytöv., Liimat. & Niskanen (2014)

Species of fungus

Phlegmacium cremeiamarescens is a species of mushroom-forming fungus in the family Cortinariaceae. First described in 2014 as Cortinarius cremeiamarescens, it was reclassified in 2022 based on genomic data. The mushroom features a cream-coloured to pale ochraceous-yellow cap measuring 3.5–5.5 cm in width, pale greyish brown gills, and a white stem that gradually becomes pale brownish yellow with age. While it has no distinctive odour, its cap cuticle has a bitter taste, which is reflected in its name cremeiamarescens. This fungus inhabits conifer-dominated forests in hemiboreal and southern boreal regions with nutrient-rich to calcareous soils, and has been recorded in southern Europe, British Columbia, and Alaska, typically fruiting between late August and late October.

== Taxonomy ==
The fungus was originally described in 2014 by the mycologists Ilkka Kytövuori, Kare Liimatainen and Tuula Niskanen, who classified it as Cortinarius cremeiamarescens. The holotype specimen was collected in Sweden, specifically in the Ollajvs Nature Reserve located between Alskog and När parishes on Gotland. It was found on 27 September 2011, by I. Kytövuori (collection number 11-014) in a mesic to damp spruce forest that also contained some pine (Pinus), oak (Quercus), and hazel (Corylus). The holotype is preserved at the University of Helsinki herbarium (H). It was placed in the (subgenus Phlegmacium) of the large mushroom genus Cortinarius. The specific epithet cremeiamarescens refers to the fruiting body colour and the bitter-tasting cap cuticle. Phlegmacium gentianeus is a sister species with which it has been previously confused.

In 2022 the species was transferred from Cortinarius and reclassified as Phlegmacium cremeiamarescens based on genomic data.

== Description ==
The cap (pileus) of Phlegmacium cremeiamarescens measures 3.5–5.5 cm in width, developing from hemispherical to convex before becoming expanded. It has a very finely innate fibrillose surface texture and displays a cream-coloured to pale ochraceous-yellow colouration. The gills (lamellae) are notched where they meet the stem, almost crowded, and pale greyish brown in colour.

The stem (stipe) is 6.5–9.5 cm long, measuring 0.7–1.4 cm thick at its top and widening to 1–2.3 cm at its base, featuring a slightly marginate bulb. Initially white, the stem gradually becomes pale brownish yellow with age. The universal veil is white and sparse, primarily visible at the bulb margin.

The flesh (context) is white. The fungus has no distinctive odour, but the cap cuticle has a bitter taste. Dried herbarium specimens (Latin: specimina exsiccata) show an ochraceous clay-colour to ochraceous yellow to warm ochraceous brown appearance, especially at the centre of the cap, while the stem becomes pale grey to brown. Microscopically, the spores measure approximately 7.8 micrometre (μm) in length by 4.7 μm in width, with a ratio of length to width averaging 1.67. They range from lemon-shaped (citriform) to narrowly spindle-shaped (fusoid) with a distinct beak, are thin-walled, and feature fairly fine, dense, and often sharp surface warts. The spores are slightly to moderately reactive with Melzer's reagent (dextrinoid). The spore-producing cells (basidia) measure 24–34 μm by 6.5–8 μm, are narrowly club-shaped with four spores each, very thin-walled, colourless, and more or less filled with blood red droplets.

The gill tissue (lamellar trama) consists of yellow hyphae filled with small blood red drops, with larger globose and worm-like oil droplets (guttules) being relatively scarce (notably fewer than in the related species P. gentianeus). The hyphae at the stem apex are almost colourless to yellow, smooth, and full of small golden yellow to blood red drops, with fewer larger globose and worm-like guttules.

The cap's outer layer (pileipellis) features a strongly gelatinous upper section (epicutis) with hyphae 2–6 μm wide that are very thin-walled and difficult to define, filled with small to medium-sized blood red guttules, mostly evenly distributed throughout the hyphae. The layer beneath the epicutis (hypoderm) is present and pale yellow. In comparison, P. gentianeus has epicutis hyphae full of very long, worm-like, foamy guttules, and a much thicker blood-red layer than P. cremeiamarescens.

== Habitat and distribution ==
Phlegmacium cremeiamarescens inhabits conifer-dominated forests in hemiboreal and southern boreal regions, preferring nutrient-rich to calcareous soils. The species has been recorded in southern Europe as well as western North America, particularly in British Columbia and Alaska. Fruiting typically occurs between late August and late October.
