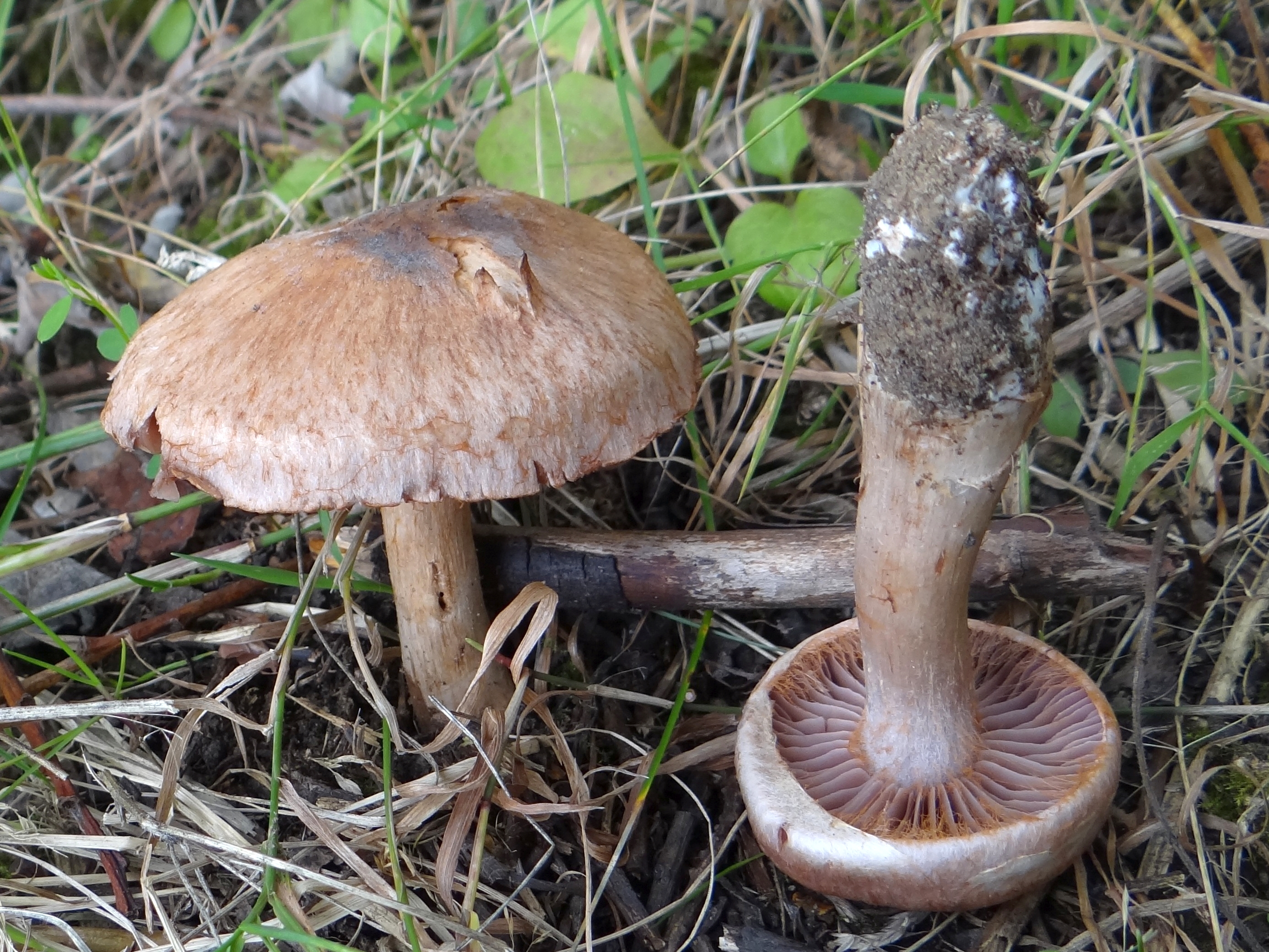

Scientific classification
- Kingdom: Fungi
- Division: Basidiomycota
- Class: Agaricomycetes
- Order: Agaricales
- Family: Cortinariaceae
- Genus: Phlegmacium
- Species: P. glaucopus

Binomial name
- Phlegmacium glaucopus (Schaeff.) Wünsche (1877)

Synonyms
- Agaricus glaucopus Schaeff. (1774); Agaricus defossus Batsch (1786) Cortinarius glaucopus (Schaeff.) Gray (1821)

= Phlegmacium glaucopus =

Species of fungus

Phlegmacium glaucopus
- Mycological characteristics
- Gills on hymenium
- Cap is convex
- Hymenium is adnate or free
- Stipe has a cortina
- Spore print is reddish-brown
- Ecology is mycorrhizal
- Edibility is inedible

Phlegmacium glaucopus is a species of fungus in the family Cortinariaceae. It is commonly known as the blue-foot webcap.

== Taxonomy ==
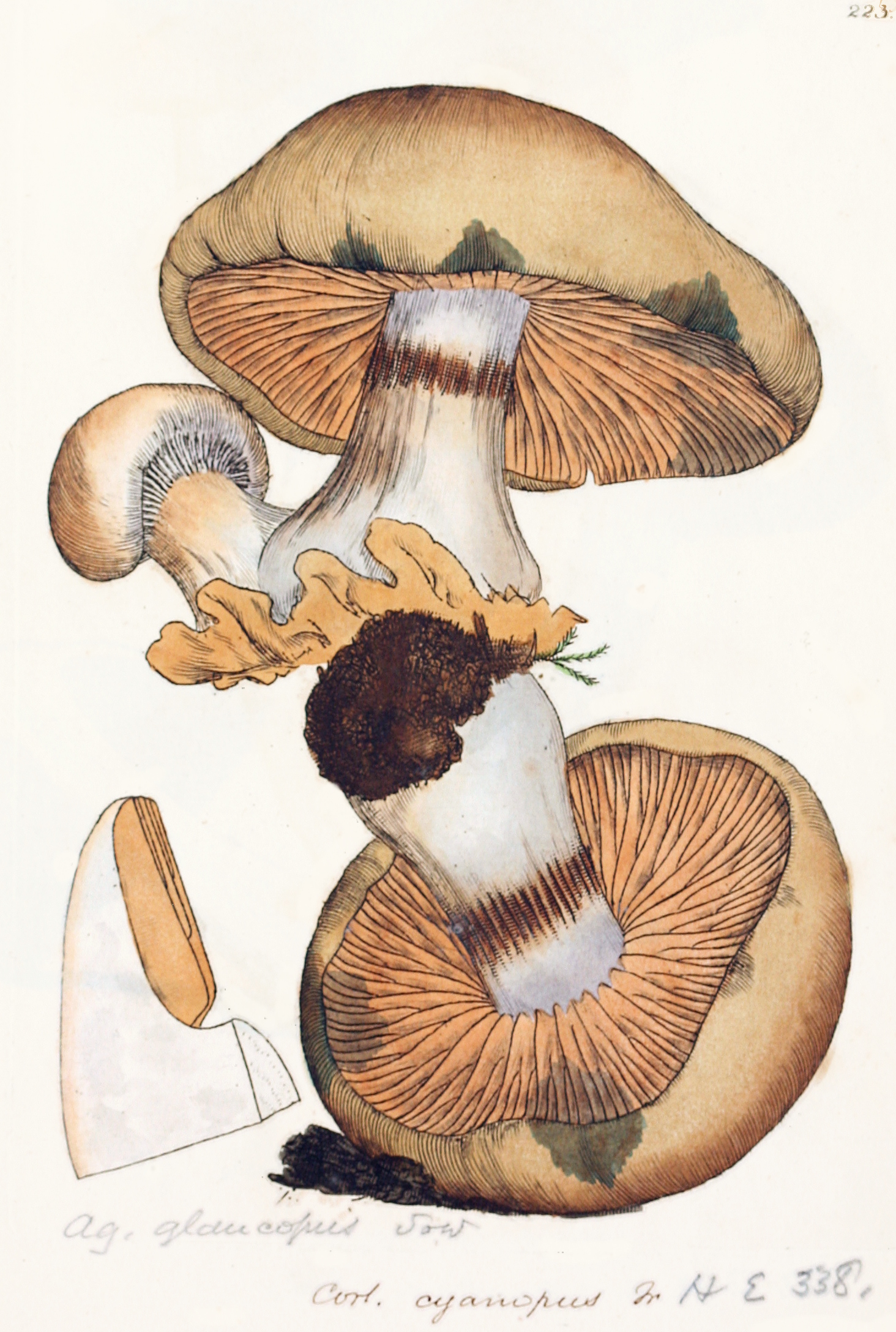

The species was first described as Agaricus glaucopus by Jacob Christian Schäffer in 1774. It was reclassified as Cortinarius glaucopus in 1821 by the British mycologist Samuel Frederick Gray. However the fully taxonomic history of this species is complicated by numerous proposed variants and forms.

Within the genus Cortinarius, it was classified in the subgenus Phlegmacium and section Glaucopodes. A 2014 genetic study confirmed it was synonymous with C. glaucopoides and that C. subrubrovelatus was a distinct species.

In 2022 a genomic study was carried out which radically reshaped the family Cortinariaceae resulting in many Cortinarius species being transferred to new or existing genera. C. glaucopus, C. glaucopoides and C. glaucopoides were among the species transferred to the Phlegmacium genus.

Common names in other languages include Schwachknolliger Klumpfuss (German), Cortinaire à pied glauque (French) and Szálaskalapú pókhálósgomba (Hungarian).

== Description ==
The fruit bodies of this fungus have convex caps 4 to 12 cm (1.6 to 4.7 in) across and ochre or tawny in colour with prominent darker brown fibres. Like other members of the genus, young mushrooms are covered in a web-like veil (cortina) from the cap margin to the stipe. The bulbous stipe is 4–10 cm tall and 1–3 cm wide, pale lilac-blue initially with lower parts fading to yellow-white. The flesh is yellow-white with a blue hue in the upper stipe. The lilac-blue gills are adnate or free, and become brown as the spores mature. The smell, if present, is slightly mealy. The spore print is red-brown and the spores measure 6.5–8.5 by 4.5–5 μm.

=== Similar species ===
The species is relatively difficult to identify. Similar species include Cortinarius caerulescens, C. pansa, C. sodagnitus, and C. subfoetens.

== Habitat and distribution ==
Phlegmacium glaucopus appears from August onwards into autumn in deciduous and coniferous forests, often in profuse numbers. It can be found in fairy rings.

The species is found in Western North America (both the United States and Canada), and is common in the Rocky Mountains. It is rare east of the Great Plains; it is rare in the British Isles.

== Ecology ==
P. glaucopus forms ectomycorrhizae that are unusually hydrophobic (water-repellent) compared with other fungi, which has led to interest in decoding its genome. DNA studies indicate it may decompose toxic polycyclic aromatic compounds in the soil with specially adapted oxidizing enzymes.

== Edibility ==
The flesh is mild tasting, and not highly regarded. It is considered inedible; because it closely resembles many other species, including some that are deadly poisonous, its consumption is warned against. In Tlaxcala, Mexico, it is collected in June and sold in the market.

== See also ==
- List of Cortinarius species
