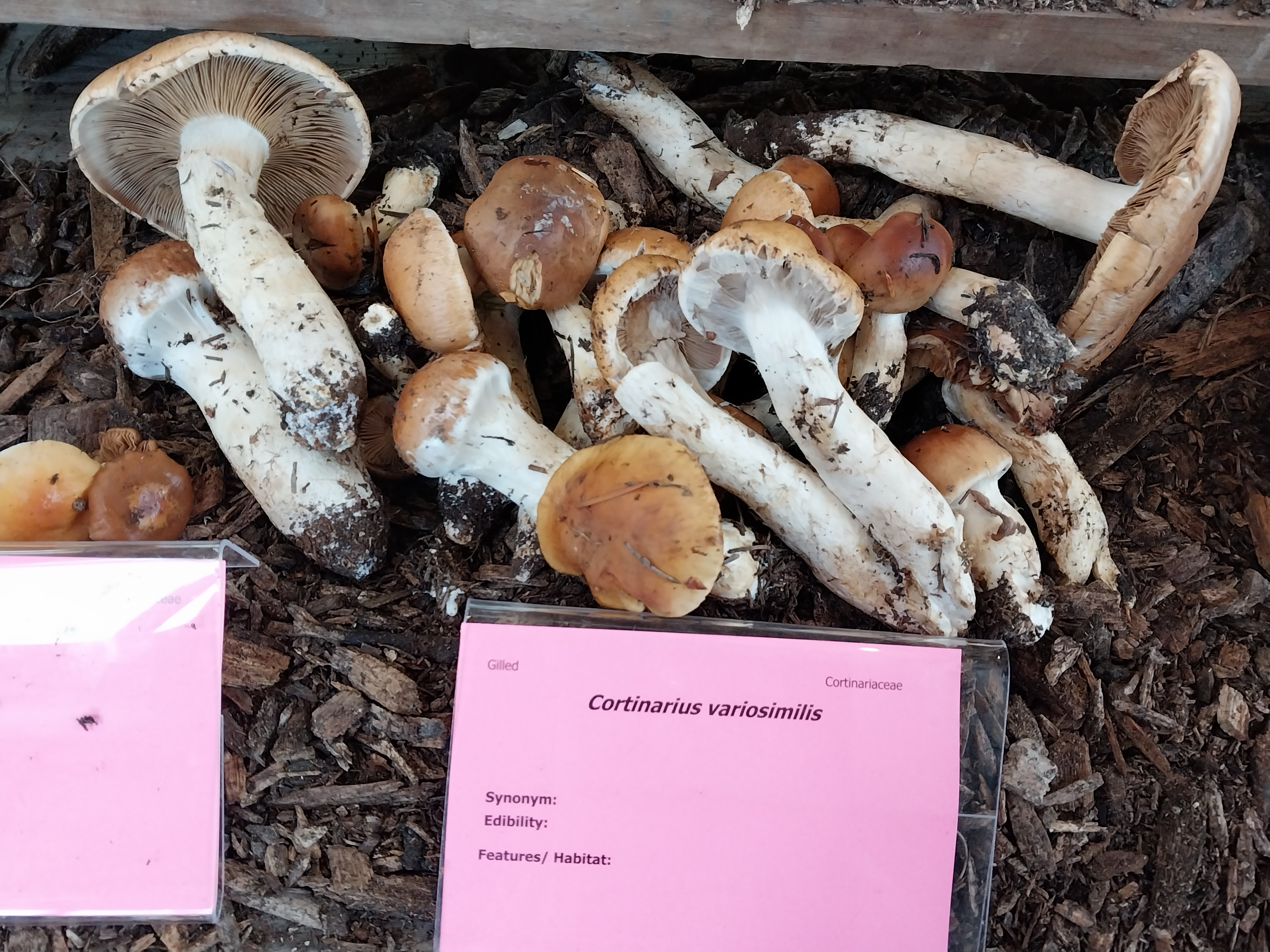

Scientific classification
- Kingdom: Fungi
- Division: Basidiomycota
- Class: Agaricomycetes
- Order: Agaricales
- Family: Cortinariaceae
- Genus: Phlegmacium
- Species: P. variosimile

Binomial name
- Phlegmacium variosimile (M.M. Moser & Ammirati) Niskanen & Liimat.

Synonyms
- Cortinarius variosimilis M.M. Moser & Ammirati

= Phlegmacium variosimile =

Species of fungus

Phlegmacium variosimile
- Mycological characteristics
- Gills on hymenium
- Cap is convex
- Hymenium is adnate or emarginate
- Stipe has a cortina
- Spore print is reddish-brown
- Ecology is mycorrhizal
- Edibility is unknown

Phlegmacium variosimile, formerly known as Cortinarius variosimilis, is a species of mushroom in the family Cortinariaceae.

== Description ==
The convex to umbonate cap of Phlegmacium variosimile is slimy when wet and yellowish brown to ochre brown in color. It is about 5-12 centimeters in diameter. The gills start out lilac and become brown as the mushroom gets older. The stipe is white in color and sometimes discolors tannish in older specimens. It is about 4-15 centimeters long and 1.5-4 centimeters wide. A cortina is present and the spore print is rusty brown. When potassium hydroxide is applied, the mushroom turns yellow.

=== Similar species ===
Cortinarius varius is similar to Phlegmacium variosimile. However, it is found in Europe and is less pale in color. C. varius also has a stronger reaction with potassium hydroxide, creating a chrome yellow color. Several other species are similar to P. variosimile and difficult to distinguish.

== Habitat and ecology ==
Phlegmacium variosimile is found in the eastern parts of the Cascades, where it grows under conifers. It seems to be more common under fir.
