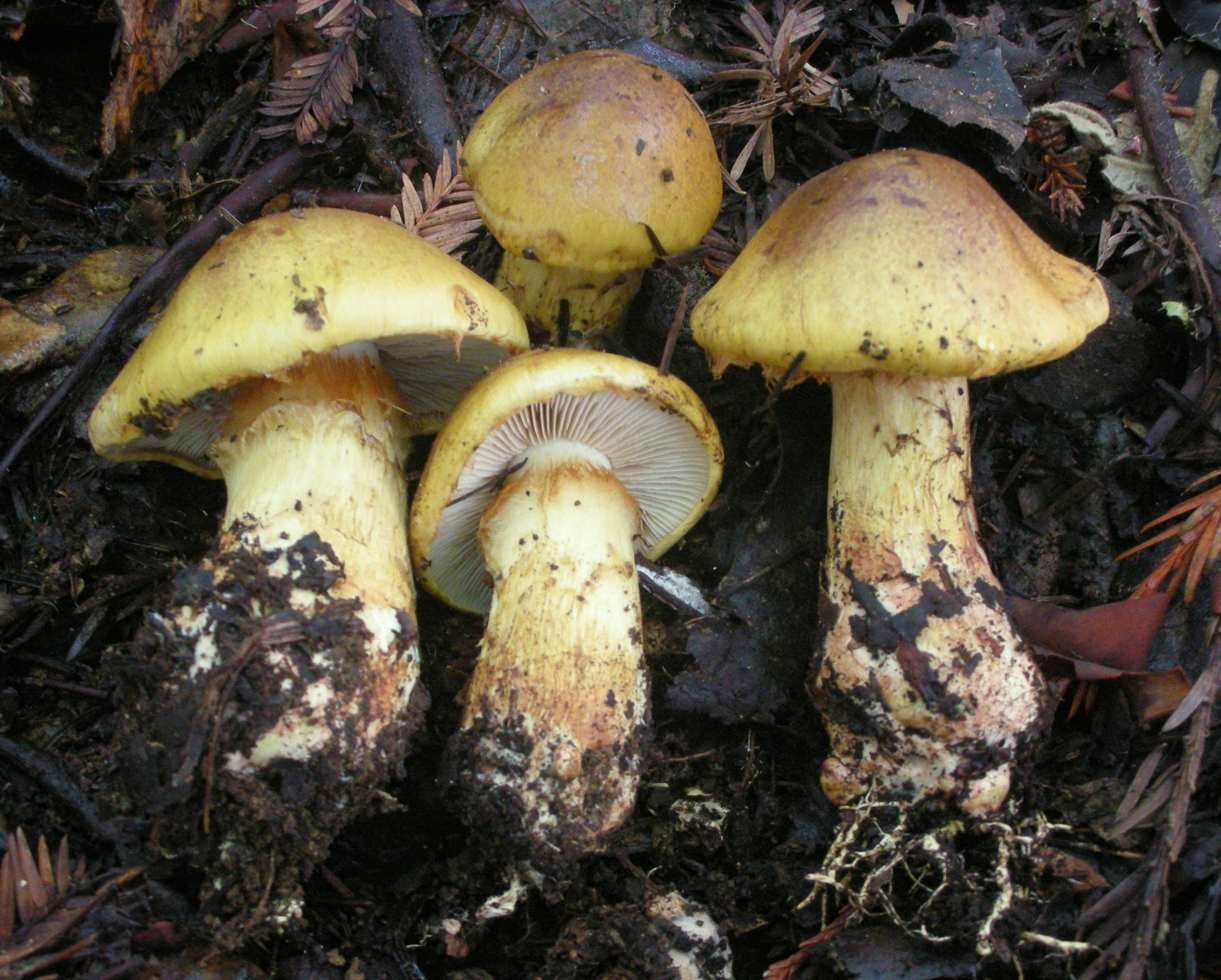

Scientific classification
- Kingdom: Fungi
- Division: Basidiomycota
- Class: Agaricomycetes
- Order: Agaricales
- Family: Cortinariaceae
- Genus: Phlegmacium
- Species: P. superbum

Binomial name
- Phlegmacium superbum (A.H. Sm.) Niskanen & Liimat.

Synonyms
- Cortinarius superbus A.H. Sm.

= Phlegmacium superbum =

Species of fungus

Phlegmacium superbum
- Mycological characteristics
- Gills on hymenium
- Cap is convex or flat
- Hymenium is adnexed
- Stipe has a cortina
- Ecology is mycorrhizal
- Edibility is unknown

Phlegmacium superbum, formerly known as Cortinarius superbus and commonly known as the superb webcap, is a species of mushroom in the family Cortinariaceae.

== Description ==
The cap of Phlegmacium superbum is yellowish to brownish in color and slimy when wet. It is about 4-15 centimeters in diameter. It starts out round or convex and becomes broadly convex or flat in age. The gills start out yellow and become brown as they mature. They are adnexed. The stipe is about 6-15 centimeters long and 1-3 centimeters wide at the top. It is wider at the base, and yellow in color. A slimy area is present near the base. A cortina is present, and the spore print is rusty brown. The smell is strong.

== Habitat and ecology ==
Phlegmacium superbum can be found in the mountains, where it grows under conifer trees. While widespread in the Pacific Northwest, it is rare.
