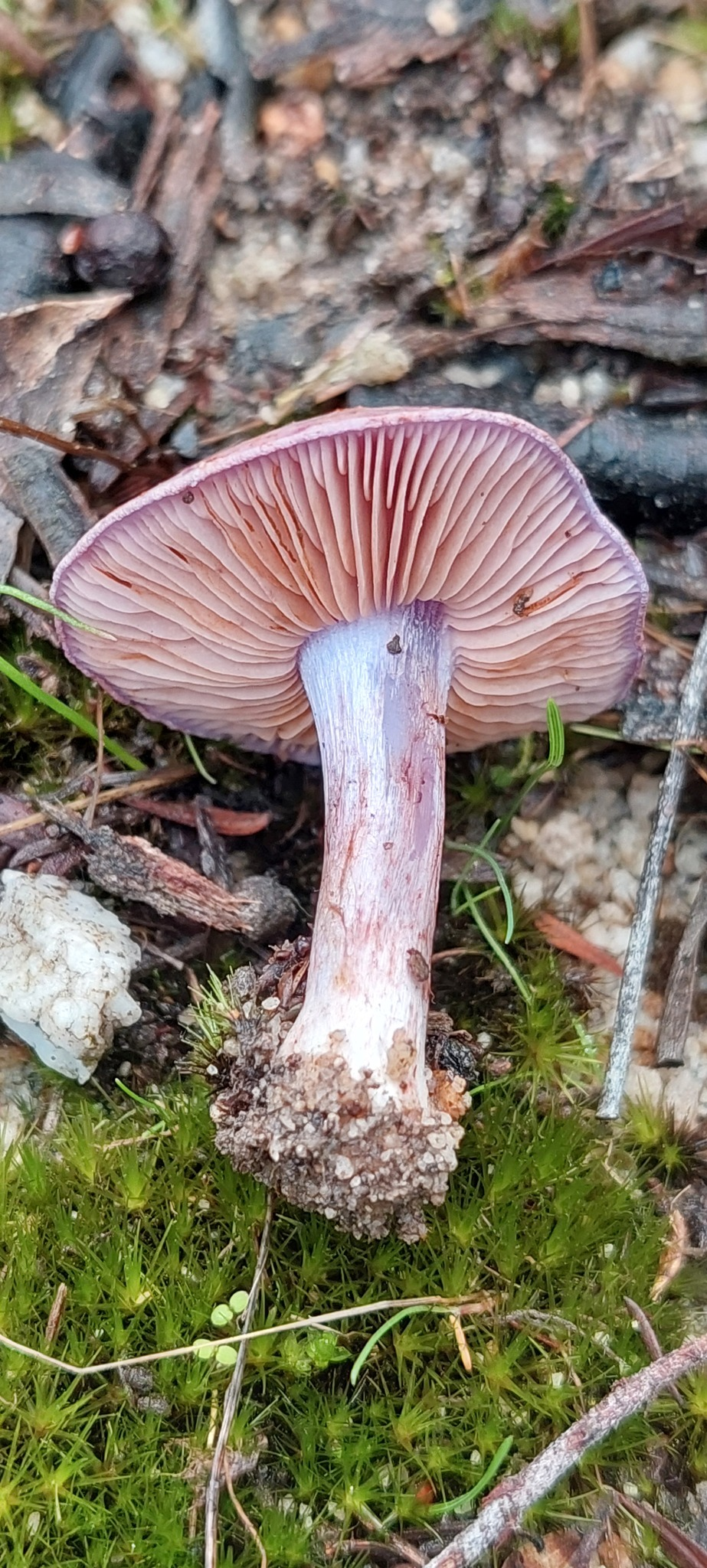
- P. lavendulense

Scientific classification
- Domain: Eukaryota
- Kingdom: Fungi
- Division: Basidiomycota
- Class: Agaricomycetes
- Order: Agaricales
- Family: Cortinariaceae
- Genus: Phlegmacium
- Species: P. lavendulense

Binomial name
- Phlegmacium lavendulense (Cleland) M.M.Moser (1960)

Synonyms
- Cortinarius lavendulensis Cleland (1928)

= Phlegmacium lavendulense =

Species of fungus

Phlegmacium lavendulense is a species of fungus in the family Cortinariaceae.

== Taxonomy ==
It was described in 1928 by John Burton Cleland who classified it as Cortinarius lavendulensis.

In 1960 it was reclassified as Phlegmacium lavendulense by Meinhard Michael Moser.

In 2022 a genomic study of the family Cortinariaceae transferred many Cortinarius species to new and existing genera. The basionym Cortinarius lavendulensis was transferred to Phlegmacium and listed in the paper as a novel combination accredited to the mycologists Tuula Niskanen and Kare Liimatainen.

== Habitat and distribution ==
It is native to Australia and was described from a specimen collected in the Mount Lofty Ranges.
