= Phlegmacium luteiaureum =

Scientific classification
- Kingdom: Fungi
- Division: Basidiomycota
- Class: Agaricomycetes
- Order: Agaricales
- Family: Cortinariaceae
- Genus: Phlegmacium
- Species: P. luteiaureum

Binomial name
- Phlegmacium luteiaureum (Kytöv., Liimat. & Niskanen) Niskanen & Liimat. (2022)

Synonyms
- Cortinarius luteiaureus Kytöv., Liimat. & Niskanen (2014)

Species of fungus

Phlegmacium luteiaureum is a litlle-known species of mushroom-forming fungus in the family Cortinariaceae. First described in 2014 as Cortinarius luteiaureus, it was reclassified in 2022 based on genomic analysis. The epithet luteiaureum refers to the distinctive yellow to brownish yellow colouration of its cap, which measures 4–7 cm in width and has a very sticky surface. The mushroom features greyish white to pale greyish brown gills, a white stem with distinctive yellow ring-like zones formed by the universal veil, and white flesh with no recorded odour. Its spores are narrowly almond-shaped with moderate to strong surface warts and often contain dark red brown angular granules. This fungus is found in northern Finland, where it grows on the ground in coniferous forests.

== Taxonomy ==
The species was described in 2014 and classified as Cortinarius luteiaureus. It was placed in the subgenus Phlegmacium of the large mushroom genus Cortinarius. The holotype specimen was collected in Finland, in the southern part of Iso Juuvankangas, west of Iso Juuvanjärvi lake, in the Juuvansydänmaa area of Kiiminki. It was found on 17 August 2007, by M. Toivonen and I. Kytövuori (collection number 07-247b, H6033617) growing in a grass-herb Norway spruce (Picea abies) forest with some birch (Betula), aspen (Populus tremula), and pine (Pinus) on calcareous soil. The holotype is preserved at the University of Helsinki herbarium (H). The specific epithet luteiaureum (originally luteiaureus) refers to the yellow colour of the cap.

In 2022 the species was transferred from Cortinarius and reclassified as Phlegmacium luteiaureum based on genomic data.

== Description ==
The cap (pileus) of Phlegmacium luteiaureum measures 4–7 cm in width, initially convex before becoming plano-convex with a low and broad umbo (central raised area). It has a viscid to glutinous (very sticky) surface without fibrillose texture, and displays a yellow to brownish yellow colouration. The gills (lamellae) are notched where they meet the stem, almost crowded, greyish white when young and later developing to pale greyish brown.

The stem (stipe) is 5–10 cm long, measuring 1–1.5 cm thick at its top and widening to 1.5–2 cm at its base, with an almost cylindrical shape ending in a club-shaped to slightly bulbous base. The stem is white in colour. The universal veil is yellow and forms distinctive girdles (ring-like zones) on the stem.The flesh (context) is white. No odour was recorded for this species. Dried specimens (Latin: specimina exsiccata) as deposted in herbaria display a yellow brownish cap, while the stem remains whitish.

Microscopically, the spores measure approximately 10.6 micrometre (μm) in length by 6.1 μm in width, with a ratio of length to width averaging 1.74. They are narrowly almond-shaped (amygdaloid) with a rounded apex, and feature moderate to fairly strong surface warts. The spores are moderately reactive with Melzer's reagent (dextrinoid), and often contain dark red brown angular granules. The spore-producing cells (basidia) measure 32–44 μm by 8–10 μm, are club-shaped with four spores each, sand brown in colour, with fairly small granules and chips.

The gill tissue (lamellar trama) consists of hyphae containing moderate to very large sand brown to red brown granules. The hyphae at the stem apex are sand brown and densely granular, with the outermost ones appearing more orange or reddish without granules.

The cap's outer layer (pileipellis) features a strongly gelatinous upper section (epicutis) with uppermost hyphae 2–4 μm wide, ochraceous yellow to ochraceous brown in colour, mostly without granules. The lower hyphae are 4–10 μm wide and filled with small to large dark red brown granules. The layer beneath the epicutis (hypoderm) is absent in this species.

== Habitat and distribution ==
Phlegmacium luteiaureum is found in northern Finland, where it grows on the ground in coniferous forests.
