= Phlegmacium balteatialutaceum =

Scientific classification
- Kingdom: Fungi
- Division: Basidiomycota
- Class: Agaricomycetes
- Order: Agaricales
- Family: Cortinariaceae
- Genus: Phlegmacium
- Species: P. balteatialutaceum

Binomial name
- Phlegmacium balteatialutaceum (Kytöv., Liimat. & Niskanen) Niskanen & Liimat. (2022)

Synonyms
- Cortinarius balteatialutaceus Kytöv., Liimat. & Niskanen (2014)

Species of fungus

Phlegmacium balteatialutaceum is a species of mushroom-forming fungus in the family Cortinariaceae. Originally described in 2014 as a member of the large genus Cortinarius, it was reclassified in 2022 based on genomic data. The fungus is characterised by its pale brown cap with a whitish margin that darkens with age, notched gills that progress from pale brownish grey to pale brown, and a whitish club-shaped stem. Found in Fennoscandia, it grows in association with birch trees in subalpine birch forests and middle to northern boreal forests near oceans, typically fruiting from mid-August to mid-September.

== Taxonomy ==
This species was originally described in 2014 by the mycologists Ilkka Kytövuori, Kare Liimatainen, and Tuula Niskanen. It was classified as Cortinarius balteatialutaceus. It was placed in the subgenus (subgenus Phlegmacium). The type specimen of was collected on 7 September 2009, in Säterklumpen, Jormlien, within the Frostviken area of Jämtland, Sweden. It was discovered by P. and I. Kytövuori (collection number 09-751) growing in a birch (Betula) forest that contained isolated Norway spruce(Picea) trees. The holotype specimen is preserved in the herbarium of the University of Helsinki.

In 2022 the species was transferred from Cortinarius and reclassified as Phlegmacium balteatialutaceum based on genomic data.

== Description ==
The cap (pileus) measures 6–12 cm in width, initially hemispherical before developing into a plano-convex shape. It features a margin that remains curved inward (involute) for a considerable period. When young, the cap surface is slightly sticky but becomes dry with age. The colouration is pale brown with a whitish to very pale brown margin, with the centre gradually darkening to a deeper brown as the fungus matures. The gills (lamellae) are notched where they meet the stem (emarginate), densely packed (crowded), and show a progression in colour from pale brownish grey in young specimens to pale brown in maturity.

The stem (stipe) measures 5–7 cm in length with a club-shaped (clavate) structure. It measures 1.3–2.5 cm thick at the top, widening to 1.8–3.5 cm at the base, sometimes forming an almost marginate bulb. The stem is predominantly whitish in colour, with a sparse white universal veil (a protective tissue that covers the immature fruiting body). The flesh (context) is white throughout, and the fungus lacks any distinctive odour. When potassium hydroxide (KOH) solution is applied to the flesh, it produces a yellow reaction. Dried specimens (Latin: specimina exsiccata) as regularly deposited in herbaria show a leather brown cap centre with a paler margin and a very pale brownish stem.

Microscopically, the spores measure 9.1–10.9 by 5.0–5.9 μm (average 10.0 by 5.4 μm). The spores are almond-to-spindle shaped (amygdaloid-fusoid), occasionally featuring a slight depression above the attachment point (suprahilar depression). Their surface is moderately to strongly covered with wart-like protrusions (verrucose) that typically do not connect to each other. The spores are weakly dextrinoid (turning reddish-brown when stained with iodine) and yellowish brown in colour.

The basidia (spore-producing structures) measure 30–39 by 7–8.5 μm, are club-shaped, pale brownish, and show fine granulation at the base. The tissue between the gills (lamellar trama) contains hyphae with moderate to large, dark rice-like granules against a yellowish-green background. The hyphae at the stem apex range from pale yellow to pale brown, with the outermost hyphae containing reddish-brown granular contents.

The outer layer of the cap (pileipellis) is very weakly gelatinous, with the uppermost hyphae measuring 3–8 μm in width. These hyphae range from pale ochre to reddish-brown and feature very fine, dense encrustation with small, reddish-brown granules. Deeper in the pileipellis, some hyphae contain fairly large, reddish-brown to blackish-brown granules and chips. The thin-walled upper hyphae degrade with age and are typically absent in older specimens. The fungus lacks a hypoderm (a layer of differentiated cells beneath the pileipellis).

== Habitat and distribution ==
Phlegmacium balteatialutaceum was found in Fennoscandia, where it grows in association with birch in subalpine birch forests as well as middle and northern boreal forests located close to oceans. Fruiting occurs from mid-August to mid-September.

== See also ==
- List of Cortinarius species
