= Phlegmacium myrtilliphilum =

Scientific classification
- Domain: Eukaryota
- Kingdom: Fungi
- Division: Basidiomycota
- Class: Agaricomycetes
- Order: Agaricales
- Family: Cortinariaceae
- Genus: Phlegmacium
- Species: P. myrtilliphilum

Binomial name
- Phlegmacium myrtilliphilum (Kytöv., Liimat., Niskanen & Brandrud) Niskanen & Liimat. (2022)

Synonyms
- Cortinarius myrtilliphilus Kytöv., Liimat., Niskanen & Brandrud (2014)

Species of mushroom-forming fungus

Phlegmacium myrtilliphilum is a species of mushroom-forming fungus in the family Cortinariaceae, first described in 2014 as a member of the genus Cortinarius before being reclassified in 2022. It is characterized by its medium-sized fruit bodies with pale yellowish-brown to ochraceous caps, greyish-white gills that turn pale brown with age, and distinctively shaped spores with an elongated apex. This fungus grows in mesic spruce-dominated forests with bilberry (Vaccinium myrtillus) understory, from which its name derives. Currently known only from the middle boreal zone of Finland and Norway, it appears to be relatively rare and produces its fruiting bodies in autumn.

== Taxonomy ==
The species was described in 2014 and classified as Cortinarius myrtilliphilus. The type specimen of was collected on 14 September 1997 by I. Kytövuori (no. 97‑1469) in Suolijärvi–Siikajärvi, at the north‑west foot of Siikavaara (Rönninvaara) in the municipality of Suomussalmi, Kainuu, Finland. The fungus was found in a gently sloping, partly swampy grass–herb–Picea forest with scattered Pinus, Betula, Populus, Alnus incana and various Salix species. The holotype (H6032751) is preserved at the herbarium of Helsinki University (H), and an isotype (duplicate) held at the New York Botanical Garden (NY).

The fungus was placed in the subgenus Phlegmacium of the large mushroom genus Cortinarius. The specific epithet myrtilliphilum (originally myrtilliphilus) alludes to the association with Vaccinium myrtillus plants. In 2022 the species was transferred from Cortinarius and reclassified as Phlegmacium myrtilliphilum based on genomic data.

== Description ==
Phlegmacium myrtilliphilum produces a medium‑sized fruit body with a cap (pileus) measuring 4.5–9 cm broad, initially hemispherical and becoming plano‑convex, its margin slightly incurved. Young caps are weakly to distinctly viscid from a thin, soon‑drying veil, showing appressed scales, especially at the centre. Colour varies from pale yellowish‑brown to darker ochraceous or leather brown—reminiscent of Cortinarius balteatus—with a paler, almost whitish margin and occasional hygrophanous streaks (bands that change hue as the cap loses moisture). The gills (lamellae) are emarginate (notched where they meet the stipe), crowded, greyish white in youth and turning pale brown as spores mature. The stipe is 5.5–11 cm long, 1–2.5 cm thick near the apex and 1.5–3 cm wide at the base, clavate, white at first, then pale brown from the base. A sparse white universal veil may leave remnant patches. The flesh (context) is white, faintly greyish hygrophanous at the stipe apex, and emits a faint, pleasant odour resembling corn. In dried specimens, the pileus is uniformly pale warm yellowish‑brown to brown—sometimes darker centrally—with the stipe matching but lighter. A strong potassium hydroxide reaction turns fresh context bright yellow, fading with age or remaining only at the margin.

Microscopically, spores measure 10.9–13.4 by 6.3–7.5 micrometre (μm) and are amygdaloid‑fusoid with a distinct suprahilar depression (the notch at the former point of attachment) and an elongated apex, much like those of Cortinarius collinitus. Their surfaces range from finely to moderately verrucose (warted) and stain slightly dextrinoid (reddish‑brown) in Melzer's reagent. Basidia are four‑spored, sand brown, 33–45 by 8.5–11 μm, bearing few dark granules. The lamellar trama consists of pale yellowish, smooth hyphae with small granules, while stipe‑apex hyphae are pale brown—outermost cells more reddish—with scant dark granules. The pileipellis features a gelatinous epicutis of erect‑sinuose hyphae typically 4–6 μm wide over a repent layer of smooth, thin‑walled hyphae 5–10 μm wide, spirally incrusted with angular dark red‑brown particles. Deeper hypodermal hyphae are slightly thicker, smooth to coarsely incrusted, containing dark red‑brown granular to farinose (meal‑like) contents.

== Habitat and distribution ==
Phlegmacium myrtilliphilum occurs in mesic spruce‑dominated forests, where the understory ranges from richer to poorer bilberry (Vaccinium myrtillus) communities. At the time of its original publication, it had only been recorded in the middle boreal zone of Finland and Norway, suggesting it may be rare. Fruiting bodies emerge in autumn.

== See also ==
- List of Cortinarius species
