= Phlegmacium flavivelatum =

Scientific classification
- Kingdom: Fungi
- Division: Basidiomycota
- Class: Agaricomycetes
- Order: Agaricales
- Family: Cortinariaceae
- Genus: Phlegmacium
- Species: P. flavivelatum

Binomial name
- Phlegmacium flavivelatum (Kytöv., Liimat. & Niskanen) Niskanen & Liimat. (2022)

Synonyms
- Cortinarius flavivelatus Kytöv., Liimat. & Niskanen (2014)

Species of fungus

Phlegmacium flavivelatum is a species of mushroom-forming fungus in the family Cortinariaceae. First described in 2014 as Cortinarius flavivelatus, it was reclassified in 2022 based on molecular data. The mushroom features a 5–8 cm viscid cap coloured olive-brown to ochraceous, emarginate (notched) gills that change from pale-bluish to brownish, and a whitish stem with distinctive yellow veil remnants forming girdles. It is closely related to Phlegmacium pini, which differs by having a white veil and larger spores. The species is known to occur only in boreal coniferous forests in Sweden, where it was collected in a spruce heath forest with pine and birch trees.

== Taxonomy ==
It was originally described in 2014 by the mycologists Ilkka Kytövuori, Kare Liimatainen and Tuula Niskanen who classified it as Cortinarius flavivelatus. The type specimen was collected on 15 August 15 by Kytövuori (collection number 98-885) in Sweden. It was found in Norrbotten province near Pajala, specifically in the Junosuando locality within a Nature Reserve. The habitat was a relatively dry Picea abies (Norway spruce) heath forest that also contained Pinus (pine) and Betula (birch) trees, interspersed with open meadow areas.

The taxon was originally classified in the (subgenus Phlegmacium) of the large mushroom genus Cortinarius. The specific epithet flavivelatum (originally flavivelatus) refers to the yellow colour of the universal veil.

In 2022 the species was transferred from Cortinarius and reclassified as Phlegmacium flavivelatum based on molecular data.

== Description ==
Cortinarius flavivelatus is a mushroom-forming fungus characterised by a medium-sized fruiting body. The pileus (cap) measures 5–8 cm in width, initially hemispherical to convex, later becoming plano-convex. It has a viscid surface with fine, innate fibrils, coloured olive brown to ochraceous brown at the centre, fading to lighter tones at the margin, and displays hygrophanous streaking patterns.

The lamellae (gills) are emarginate (a "notched" attachment to the stipe) and densely arranged. They have a distinctive pale-bluish colouration when young, later developing into pale brown with a bluish tint. The stipe (stem) measures 6–10 cm in length, with a thickness of 1–1.8 cm at the apex, widening to 1.5–2.5 cm at the base, making it club-shaped (clavate) to nearly cylindrical in shape. The stipe is predominantly whitish with a bluish tint observable at the apex.

A defining feature of this species is its yellow universal veil, which forms girdles on the stipe and has a somewhat viscid texture. The context (flesh) is white throughout the pileus and lower portions of the stipe, while displaying a bluish colour at the stipe apex. The fungus has an indistinct odour and shows no reaction when tested with potassium hydroxide solution (KOH). Dried specimens (Latin: specimina exsiccata) as deposited in herbaria have a warm yellowish to reddish brown pileus and a whitish stipe.

Under the microscope, Cortinarius flavivelatus shows distinctive features. The basidiospores are almond to lemon-shaped, measuring about 9.1–10.9 by 5.0–5.9 μm, with a finely warty surface. The mushroom's internal structure contains various coloured elements: the spore-producing cells (basidia) are club-shaped and pale brown; the gill tissue contains dark granules; the stipe surface has entangled threads with reddish-black granules; and the cap cuticle consists of a gelatinous layer of ochre-brown threads over a well-developed reddish-brown layer beneath, both featuring dark brown granular deposits.

=== Similar species ===
The species is closely related to Phlegmacium pini, which differs by having a white universal veil and larger spores.

== Habitat and distribution ==
Cortinarius flavivelatus is known to occur only in boreal coniferous forests of Sweden.
