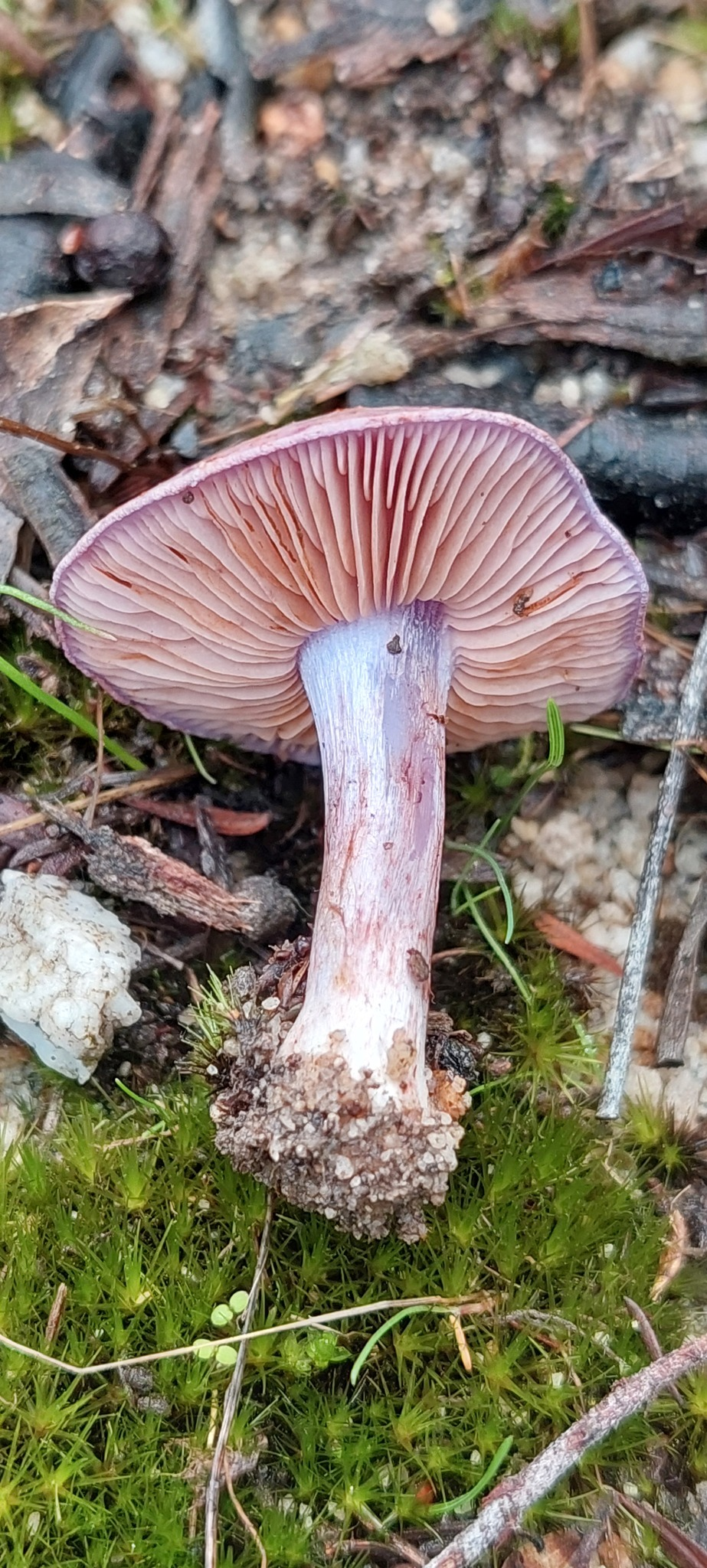
- Phlegmacium lavendulense

Scientific classification
- Domain: Eukaryota
- Kingdom: Fungi
- Division: Basidiomycota
- Class: Agaricomycetes
- Order: Agaricales
- Family: Cortinariaceae
- Genus: Phlegmacium (Fr.) Wünsche (1877) em. Liimat. & Niskanen

Type species
- Phlegmacium saginum (Fr.) Liimat. & Niskanen (2021)

= Phlegmacium =

Genus of fungi

Phlegmacium is a genus of fungi in the family Cortinariaceae.

== Taxonomy ==
The genus was created in 1877 by the German mycologist Friedrich Otto Wünsche based on the earlier 1821 classification of the Agaricus tribe Phlegmacium by the Swedish mycologist Elias Magnus Fries.

In 2022 the family Cortinariaceae, which previously contained only the one genus of Cortinarius was reclassified based on genomic data and split into the genera of Cortinarius, Aureonarius, Austrocortinarius, Calonarius, Cystinarius, Hygronarius, Mystinarius, Phlegmacium, Thaxterogaster and Volvanarius. Numerous Cortinarius species were transferred into the genus of Phlegmacium as a result of this work.

The genus is further divided with subgenus and section classifications:

- Phlegmacium subgenus Phlegmacium includes the clade: Caligata and the sections: Phlegmacium, Arguta, Claricoloria, Elastica, Obsoleta, Phlegmacioida, Percomia, Rhizophora, Seraria, and Varia.
- Phlegmacium subgenus Bulbopodium includes the sections: Amoenolentia, Arcifolia, Aureocistophila, Bulbopodium, Caerulea, Caerulescentia, Dionysae, Glaucocephala, Glaucopodes, Subhymenogaster and Taura.
- Phlegmacium subgenus Carbonella includes the section: Carbonella.

== Species ==
As of January 2023, Species Fungorum accepted 252 species of Phlegmacium.

1. Phlegmacium acidophilum (Brandrud) Niskanen & Liimat. (2022)
2. Phlegmacium acystidiosum (Thiers) Niskanen & Liimat. (2022)
3. Phlegmacium albescens (A.H. Sm.) Niskanen & Liimat. (2022)
4. Phlegmacium albofragrans (Ammirati & M.M. Moser) Niskanen & Liimat. (2022)
5. Phlegmacium alticaudum (Reumaux) Niskanen & Liimat. (2022)
6. Phlegmacium americanomussivum (Liimat. & Niskanen) Niskanen & Liimat. (2022)
7. Phlegmacium amoenolens (Rob. Henry ex P.D. Orton) Niskanen & Liimat. (2022)
8. Phlegmacium aquilanum (T.S. Jeppesen & Frøslev) Niskanen & Liimat. (2022)
9. Phlegmacium areni-silvae (Brandrud) Niskanen & Liimat. (2022)
10. Phlegmacium areolatoimbricatum (Cleland) Niskanen & Liimat. (2022)
11. Phlegmacium argutum (Fr.) Niskanen & Liimat. (2022)
12. Phlegmacium artosum (Soop) Niskanen & Liimat. (2022)
13. Phlegmacium atrochalybaeum (Ammirati & M.M. Moser) Niskanen & Liimat. (2022)
14. Phlegmacium aurantiobasalis (Bidaud) Niskanen & Liimat. (2022)
15. Phlegmacium aurantiopallidum (Bidaud) Niskanen & Liimat. (2022)
16. Phlegmacium aureocistophilum (Vila, Contu & Llimona) Niskanen & Liimat. (2022)
17. Phlegmacium aurescens (Ammirati, Bojantchev, Garnica, Beug, Liimat. & Niskanen) Niskanen & Liimat. (2022)
18. Phlegmacium aurilicis (Chevassut & Trescol) Niskanen & Liimat. (2022)
19. Phlegmacium balteatialutaceum (Kytöv., Liimat. & Niskanen) Niskanen & Liimat. (2022)
20. Phlegmacium balteatibulbosum (Kytöv., Niskanen, Liimat., Bojantchev & A.F.S. Taylor) Niskanen & Liimat. (2022)
21. Phlegmacium balteaticlavatum (Kytöv., Liimat. & Niskanen) Niskanen & Liimat. (2022)
22. Phlegmacium balteatocumatile (Rob. Henry ex P.D. Orton) Niskanen & Liimat. (2022)
23. Phlegmacium balteatoindicum (Dima, Semwal, V. Papp, Brandrud & V.K. Bhatt) Niskanen & Liimat. (2022)
24. Phlegmacium balteatotomentosum (Rob. Henry) Niskanen & Liimat. (2022)
25. Phlegmacium balteatum (Fr.) A. Blytt (1905)
26. Phlegmacium barrentium (Poirier & Reumaux) Niskanen & Liimat. (2022)
27. Phlegmacium basorapulum (Danks, T. Lebel & Vernes) Niskanen & Liimat. (2022)
28. Phlegmacium beugii (Ammirati, Bojantchev, Liimat., Niskanen & Garnica) Niskanen & Liimat. (2022)
29. Phlegmacium bisporiger (Contu) Niskanen & Liimat. (2022)
30. Phlegmacium blattoi (R. Mazza) Niskanen & Liimat. (2022)
31. Phlegmacium boreicyanites (Kytöv., Liimat., Niskanen & A.F.S. Taylor) Niskanen & Liimat. (2022)
32. Phlegmacium boreidionysae (Kytöv., Liimat., Niskanen & Dima) Niskanen & Liimat. (2022)
33. Phlegmacium borgsjoeense (Brandrud) Niskanen & Liimat. (2022)
34. Phlegmacium brunneiaurantium (Kytöv., Liimat. & Niskanen) Niskanen & Liimat. (2022)
35. Phlegmacium brunneocoerulescens (Rob. Henry) Niskanen & Liimat. (2022)
36. Phlegmacium brunneolividum (Bidaud) Niskanen & Liimat. (2022)
37. Phlegmacium brunneoviolaceum (Bidaud) Niskanen & Liimat. (2022)
38. Phlegmacium brunnescens (A.H. Sm.) Niskanen & Liimat. (2022)
39. Phlegmacium bulbolatens (Chevassut & Rob. Henry) Niskanen & Liimat. (2022)
40. Phlegmacium caesiocolor (Kytöv., Liimat. & Niskanen) Niskanen & Liimat. (2022)
41. Phlegmacium caesiocortinatum (Jul. Schäff.) Niskanen & Liimat. (2022)
42. Phlegmacium caesiogriseum Jul. Schäff. ex M.M. Moser (1960)
43. Phlegmacium caligatum (Malençon) Niskanen & Liimat. (2022)
44. Phlegmacium callimorphum (Bojantchev & R.M. Davis) Niskanen & Liimat. (2022)
45. Phlegmacium calyptratum (A.H. Sm.) Niskanen & Liimat. (2022)
46. Phlegmacium calyptrodermum (A.H. Sm.) Niskanen & Liimat. (2022)
47. Phlegmacium camptoros (Brandrud & Melot) Niskanen & Liimat. (2022)
48. Phlegmacium carbonellum (Soop) Niskanen & Liimat. (2022)
49. Phlegmacium castaneicolor (A.H. Sm.) Niskanen & Liimat. (2022)
50. Phlegmacium cephalixoides (M.M. Moser & Thiers) Niskanen & Liimat. (2022)
51. Phlegmacium cephalixolargum (Rob. Henry) Niskanen & Liimat. (2022)
52. Phlegmacium chromataphilum (Rob. Henry) Niskanen & Liimat. (2022)
53. Phlegmacium cinctipes (Bidaud, Eyssart. & Hermitte) Niskanen & Liimat. (2022)
54. Phlegmacium cistoglaucopus (A. Ortega, Vila, J.C. Campos & Fern.-Brime) Niskanen & Liimat. (2022)
55. Phlegmacium citrinifolium (A.H. Sm.) Niskanen & Liimat. (2022)
56. Phlegmacium citriolens (Ammirati & M.M. Moser) Niskanen & Liimat. (2022)
57. Phlegmacium clarobaltoides (Rob. Henry) Niskanen & Liimat. (2022)
58. Phlegmacium clarum (Reumaux) Niskanen & Liimat. (2022)
59. Phlegmacium cliduchus (Secr. ex Fr.) Niskanen & Liimat. (2022)
60. Phlegmacium coalescens (Kärcher & Seibt) Niskanen & Liimat. (2022)
61. Phlegmacium coelopus (Gasparini) Niskanen & Liimat. (2022)
62. Phlegmacium coerulescentium (Rob. Henry) Niskanen & Liimat. (2022)
63. Phlegmacium concrescens (Secr. ex Bidaud, Moënne-Locc. & Reumaux) Niskanen & Liimat. (2022)
64. Phlegmacium congeminum (Moënne-Locc. & Reumaux) Niskanen & Liimat. (2022)
65. Phlegmacium cremeiamarescens (Kytöv., Liimat. & Niskanen) Niskanen & Liimat. (2022)
66. Phlegmacium cruentipellis (Kytöv., Liimat., Niskanen & Dima) Niskanen & Liimat. (2022)
67. Phlegmacium cupreonatum (Soop) Niskanen & Liimat. (2022)
68. Phlegmacium cupreoviolaceum (Bidaud & Reumaux) Niskanen & Liimat. (2022)
69. Phlegmacium daulnoyae (Quél.) Niskanen & Liimat. (2022)
70. Phlegmacium delaportei (Rob. Henry) Niskanen & Liimat. (2022)
71. Phlegmacium durus (P.D. Orton) Niskanen & Liimat. (2022)
72. Phlegmacium eliae (Bidaud, Moënne-Locc. & Reumaux) Niskanen & Liimat. (2022)
73. Phlegmacium eucaeruleum (Rob. Henry) Niskanen & Liimat. (2022)
74. Phlegmacium exlugubre (Soop) Niskanen & Liimat. (2022)
75. Phlegmacium flavescentipes (Reumaux) Niskanen & Liimat. (2022)
76. Phlegmacium flavivelatum (Kytöv., Liimat. & Niskanen) Niskanen & Liimat. (2022)
77. Phlegmacium flavolilacinum (Lebeuf, A. Paul & J. Landry) Niskanen & Liimat. (2022)
78. Phlegmacium fraudulosoides (Liimat. & Niskanen) Niskanen & Liimat. (2022)
79. Phlegmacium fraudulosum (Britzelm.) Niskanen & Liimat. (2022)
80. Phlegmacium gentianeum (Bidaud) Niskanen & Liimat. (2022)
81. Phlegmacium georgiolens (Rob. Henry) Niskanen & Liimat. (2022)
82. Phlegmacium glaucocephalus (M.M. Moser, Ammirati & Halling) Niskanen & Liimat. (2022)
83. Phlegmacium glaucopoides (Kauffman) Niskanen & Liimat. (2022)
84. Phlegmacium glaucopus (Schaeff.) Wünsche (1877)
85. Phlegmacium gratum (Reumaux) Niskanen & Liimat. (2022)
86. Phlegmacium griseocoeruleum (Ammirati & M.M. Moser) Niskanen & Liimat. (2022)
87. Phlegmacium hedyaromaticum (C.L. Cripps & O.K. Mill.) Niskanen & Liimat. (2022)
88. Phlegmacium hemicaeruleum (Brotzu, Lorenzon, Padovan, Bellù & Dima) Niskanen & Liimat. (2022)
89. Phlegmacium herculeum (Malençon) Niskanen & Liimat. (2022)
90. Phlegmacium heterosporum Sosin (1960)
91. Phlegmacium hysginicolor (Bidaud) Niskanen & Liimat. (2022)
92. Phlegmacium ignatianum Rick (1961)
93. Phlegmacium inexspectatum (Brandrud) Niskanen & Liimat. (2022)
94. Phlegmacium inusitatum (A. Ortega, Bidaud, Suár.-Sant. & Vila) Niskanen & Liimat. (2022)
95. Phlegmacium josephii (Reumaux) Niskanen & Liimat. (2022)
96. Phlegmacium kuehneri (M.M. Moser) Niskanen & Liimat. (2022)
97. Phlegmacium kytoevuorii (Niskanen & Liimat.) Niskanen & Liimat. (2022)
98. Phlegmacium langei (Rob. Henry) Niskanen & Liimat. (2022)
99. Phlegmacium largusiellum (Reumaux) Niskanen & Liimat. (2022)
100. Phlegmacium latoclaricolor (Rob. Henry) Niskanen & Liimat. (2022)
101. Phlegmacium lavendulense (Cleland) M.M. Moser (1960)
102. Phlegmacium lemanicum (A. Favre & Vialard) Niskanen & Liimat. (2022)
103. Phlegmacium leonicolor (Reumaux) Niskanen & Liimat. (2022)
104. Phlegmacium lepistoides (T.S. Jeppesen & Frøslev) Niskanen & Liimat. (2022)
105. Phlegmacium lintrisporum (Reumaux) Niskanen & Liimat. (2022)
106. Phlegmacium luhmannii (Münzmay, Saar & B. Oertel) Niskanen & Liimat. (2022)
107. Phlegmacium luteiaureum (Kytöv., Liimat. & Niskanen) Niskanen & Liimat. (2022)
108. Phlegmacium luteoarmillatum (A.H. Sm.) Niskanen & Liimat. (2022)
109. Phlegmacium luteobrunnescens (A.H. Sm.) Niskanen & Liimat. (2022)
110. Phlegmacium luteocingulatum (Bidaud & Fillion) Niskanen & Liimat. (2022)
111. Phlegmacium luteoimmarginatum (Rob. Henry) Niskanen & Liimat. (2022)
112. Phlegmacium luteovaginans (Bidaud & Faurite-Gendron) Niskanen & Liimat. (2022)
113. Phlegmacium maculatipes (Bidaud) Niskanen & Liimat. (2022)
114. Phlegmacium maculipes (Peck) Niskanen & Liimat. (2022)
115. Phlegmacium maculosum (Pers.) Niskanen & Liimat. (2022)
116. Phlegmacium mahiquesii (Vila, A. Ortega & Suár.-Sant.) Niskanen & Liimat. (2022)
117. Phlegmacium majoranae (Frøslev & T.S. Jeppesen) Niskanen & Liimat. (2022)
118. Phlegmacium malavalii (Bellanger & Ballarà) Niskanen & Liimat. (2022)
119. Phlegmacium marklundii (Brandrud, Dima, Saar, Schmidt-Stohn & Ballarà) Niskanen & Liimat. (2022)
120. Phlegmacium mediterraneense (A. Ortega & Vila) Niskanen & Liimat. (2022)
121. Phlegmacium memoria-annae annae (Gasparini) Niskanen & Liimat. (2022)
122. Phlegmacium misermontii (Chevassut & Rob. Henry) Niskanen & Liimat. (2022)
123. Phlegmacium moenne-loccozii loccozii (Bidaud) Niskanen & Liimat. (2022)
124. Phlegmacium muricinicolor (Moënne-Locc.) Niskanen & Liimat. (2022)
125. Phlegmacium mussivum (Fr.) Niskanen & Liimat. (2022)
126. Phlegmacium myrtilliphilum (Kytöv., Liimat., Niskanen & Brandrud) Niskanen & Liimat. (2022)
127. Phlegmacium neotriumphans (Bidaud, Moënne-Locc. & Reumaux) Niskanen & Liimat. (2022)
128. Phlegmacium norrlandicum (Brandrud) Niskanen & Liimat. (2022)
129. Phlegmacium obsoletum (Kühner) Niskanen & Liimat. (2022)
130. Phlegmacium occultum (Moënne-Locc. & Reumaux) Niskanen & Liimat. (2022)
131. Phlegmacium ochraceobrunneum (Rob. Henry ex Bidaud, Moënne-Locc. & Reumaux) Niskanen & Liimat. (2022)
132. Phlegmacium ochribubalinum (Kytöv., Liimat. & Niskanen) Niskanen & Liimat. (2022)
133. Phlegmacium ochroclarum (Rob. Henry) Niskanen & Liimat. (2022)
134. Phlegmacium olidoamarum (A. Favre) Niskanen & Liimat. (2022)
135. Phlegmacium olidoamethysteum (Rob. Henry & Ramm) Niskanen & Liimat. (2022)
136. Phlegmacium olidovolvatum (Bon & Trescol) Niskanen & Liimat. (2022)
137. Phlegmacium olidum (J.E. Lange) Niskanen & Liimat. (2022)
138. Phlegmacium olivaceodionysae (A. Ortega, Vila & Fern.-Brime) Niskanen & Liimat. (2022)
139. Phlegmacium olivaceolilacinum Ricek (1964)
140. Phlegmacium ophiopus (Peck) Niskanen & Liimat. (2022)
141. Phlegmacium palazonianum (Vila, A. Ortega & Fern.-Brime) Niskanen & Liimat. (2022)
142. Phlegmacium pallidifolium (A.H. Sm.) Niskanen & Liimat. (2022)
143. Phlegmacium pansa (Fr.) A. Blytt (1905)
144. Phlegmacium pansicolor (Soop) Niskanen & Liimat. (2022)
145. Phlegmacium papulosum (Fr.) Niskanen & Liimat. (2022)
146. Phlegmacium paracephalixum (Bohus) Niskanen & Liimat. (2022)
147. Phlegmacium parargutum (Bidaud, Moënne-Locc. & Reumaux) Niskanen & Liimat. (2022)
148. Phlegmacium pardinum (Reumaux) Niskanen & Liimat. (2022)
149. Phlegmacium patibile (Brandrud & Melot) Niskanen & Liimat. (2022)
150. Phlegmacium patrickense (M.M. Moser) Niskanen & Liimat. (2022)
151. Phlegmacium percome (Fr.) A. Blytt (1905)
152. Phlegmacium perpallens (Chevassut & Rob. Henry) Niskanen & Liimat. (2022)
153. Phlegmacium perstrenuus (Chevassut & Rob. Henry) Niskanen & Liimat. (2022)
154. Phlegmacium pictum Ricek (1964)
155. Phlegmacium pini (Brandrud) Niskanen & Liimat. (2022)
156. Phlegmacium piriodolens (Moënne-Locc.) Niskanen & Liimat. (2022)
157. Phlegmacium pistorium M.M. Moser (1960)
158. Phlegmacium ponderosum (A.H. Sm.) Niskanen & Liimat. (2022)
159. Phlegmacium populinum (Brandrud) Niskanen & Liimat. (2022)
160. Phlegmacium prasinocyaneum (Rob. Henry) Niskanen & Liimat. (2022)
161. Phlegmacium psalliotoides (Chevassut & Rob. Henry) Niskanen & Liimat. (2022)
162. Phlegmacium pseudoarcuatorum (Rob. Henry) Niskanen & Liimat. (2022)
163. Phlegmacium pseudocephalixum (Bidaud & Moënne-Locc.) Niskanen & Liimat. (2022)
164. Phlegmacium pseudocyanopus (Rob. Henry) Niskanen & Liimat. (2022)
165. Phlegmacium pseudodaulnoyae (Rob. Henry & Ramm) Niskanen & Liimat. (2022)
166. Phlegmacium pseudodiabolicum M.M. Moser (1960)
167. Phlegmacium pseudolargus (Rob. Henry) Niskanen & Liimat. (2022)
168. Phlegmacium pseudonaevosum (Rob. Henry) Niskanen & Liimat. (2022)
169. Phlegmacium pseudonebulare (Moënne-Locc.) Niskanen & Liimat. (2022)
170. Phlegmacium pseudopansa (Bidaud) Niskanen & Liimat. (2022)
171. Phlegmacium pseudopimum (Rob. Henry) Niskanen & Liimat. (2022)
172. Phlegmacium pseudoturmale (Bidaud & Moënne-Locc.) Niskanen & Liimat. (2022)
173. Phlegmacium pseudovariegatum (M.M. Moser) Niskanen & Liimat. (2022)
174. Phlegmacium pseudovarium (Moënne-Locc. & Reumaux) Niskanen & Liimat. (2022)
175. Phlegmacium pseudovulpinum (Rob. Henry & Ramm) Niskanen & Liimat. (2022)
176. Phlegmacium punctatisporum (Garnica) Niskanen & Liimat. (2022)
177. Phlegmacium rattinum (Soop) Niskanen & Liimat. (2022)
178. Phlegmacium reverendissimum (Bidaud, Moënne-Locc. & Reumaux) Niskanen & Liimat. (2022)
179. Phlegmacium rex-claricolorum claricolorum (Bidaud, Carteret & Reumaux) Niskanen & Liimat. (2022)
180. Phlegmacium rhizophorum (Bidaud & Consiglio) Niskanen & Liimat. (2022)
181. Phlegmacium rioussetiae (Chevassut & Rob. Henry) Niskanen & Liimat. (2022)
182. Phlegmacium rosargutum (Chevassut & Rob. Henry) Niskanen & Liimat. (2022)
183. Phlegmacium roseolimbatum Secr. ex M.M. Moser (1960)
184. Phlegmacium rubrivelatum (Garnica) Niskanen & Liimat. (2022)
185. Phlegmacium rufior (Reumaux) Niskanen & Liimat. (2022)
186. Phlegmacium rufoaurantium (Soop) Niskanen & Liimat. (2022)
187. Phlegmacium rufolatum (Moënne-Locc.) Niskanen & Liimat. (2022)
188. Phlegmacium russum (Fr.) Niskanen & Liimat. (2022)
189. Phlegmacium saginoides (Bidaud & Reumaux) Niskanen & Liimat. (2022)
190. Phlegmacium saginum (Fr.) Niskanen & Liimat. (2022)
191. Phlegmacium scaurocaninum (Chevassut & Rob. Henry) Niskanen & Liimat. (2022)
192. Phlegmacium serariicolor (Rob. Henry) Niskanen & Liimat. (2022)
193. Phlegmacium serarium (Fr.) Niskanen & Liimat. (2022)
194. Phlegmacium sobrium (P. Karst.) Niskanen & Liimat. (2022)
195. Phlegmacium spadicellum M.M. Moser (1960)
196. Phlegmacium sphagnetorum (Bidaud) Niskanen & Liimat. (2022)
197. Phlegmacium spurcum (Weinm.) Niskanen & Liimat. (2022)
198. Phlegmacium squameoradicans (Bellivier ex Cheype) Niskanen & Liimat. (2022)
199. Phlegmacium squamosocephalum (Bidaud, Moënne-Locc. & Reumaux) Niskanen & Liimat. (2022)
200. Phlegmacium stjernegaardii (Brandrud & Frøslev) Niskanen & Liimat. (2022)
201. Phlegmacium subaccedens (Rob. Henry) Niskanen & Liimat. (2022)
202. Phlegmacium subalbescens (Reumaux) Niskanen & Liimat. (2022)
203. Phlegmacium subamaricatum (Bidaud) Niskanen & Liimat. (2022)
204. Phlegmacium subbalteatum (Kühner) Niskanen & Liimat. (2022)
205. Phlegmacium subcaeruleum (A.H. Sm.) Niskanen & Liimat. (2022)
206. Phlegmacium subcrassoides (Moënne-Locc. & Remaux) Niskanen & Liimat. (2022)
207. Phlegmacium subcyanites (Bidaud) Niskanen & Liimat. (2022)
208. Phlegmacium subdecolorans (M. Langl. & Reumaux) Niskanen & Liimat. (2022)
209. Phlegmacium subdecoloratum (Reumaux) Niskanen & Liimat. (2022)
210. Phlegmacium subfoetens (M.M. Moser & McKnight) Niskanen & Liimat. (2022)
211. Phlegmacium subfoetidum (A.H. Sm.) Niskanen & Liimat. (2022)
212. Phlegmacium subfraudulosum (Kytöv., Liimat. & Niskanen) Niskanen & Liimat. (2022)
213. Phlegmacium subfuligineum (Bidaud) Niskanen & Liimat. (2022)
214. Phlegmacium subhygrophanum (Bidaud) Niskanen & Liimat. (2022)
215. Phlegmacium sublilacinum (A.H. Sm.) Niskanen & Liimat. (2022)
216. Phlegmacium subolivascens (A.H. Sm.) Niskanen & Liimat. (2022)
217. Phlegmacium subopimum (Bidaud) Niskanen & Liimat. (2022)
218. Phlegmacium subrubrovelatum (Bidaud) Niskanen & Liimat. (2022)
219. Phlegmacium subrugulosum (Bidaud & Armada) Niskanen & Liimat. (2022)
220. Phlegmacium subsolitarium (A.H. Sm.) Niskanen & Liimat. (2022)
221. Phlegmacium subspadiceum (Reumaux) Niskanen & Liimat. (2022)
222. Phlegmacium subvariiforme (Bidaud) Niskanen & Liimat. (2022)
223. Phlegmacium superbum (A.H. Sm.) Niskanen & Liimat. (2022)
224. Phlegmacium tauri (Mahiques & Reumaux) Niskanen & Liimat. (2022)
225. Phlegmacium terpsichores (Melot) Niskanen & Liimat. (2022)
226. Phlegmacium tiliae (Brandrud) Niskanen & Liimat. (2022)
227. Phlegmacium tirolianum (Bidaud, Moënne-Locc. & Reumaux) Niskanen & Liimat. (2022)
228. Phlegmacium tomentosum (Rob. Henry) Niskanen & Liimat. (2022)
229. Phlegmacium trachycystis (M.M. Moser) Niskanen & Liimat. (2022)
230. Phlegmacium triumphale (Bidaud, Moënne-Locc. & Reumaux) Niskanen & Liimat. (2022)
231. Phlegmacium triumphans (Fr.) A. Blytt (1905)
232. Phlegmacium turbinatorum (Cors. Gut. & Vila) Niskanen & Liimat. (2022)
233. Phlegmacium vacciniophilum (Brandrud) Niskanen & Liimat. (2022)
234. Phlegmacium van-campiae campiae (Consiglio) Niskanen & Liimat. (2022)
235. Phlegmacium variiforme (Malençon) Niskanen & Liimat. (2022)
236. Phlegmacium variosimile (M.M. Moser & Ammirati) Niskanen & Liimat. (2022)
237. Phlegmacium velenovskyi M.M. Moser (1960)
238. Phlegmacium velicopium (Kauffman) Niskanen & Liimat. (2022)
239. Phlegmacium veneris (Bidaud, Moënne-Locc. & Reumaux) Niskanen & Liimat. (2022)
240. Phlegmacium vernicifer (Soop) Niskanen & Liimat. (2022)
241. Phlegmacium violaceoflavescens (Lebeuf, A. Paul, J. Landry & Y. Lamoureux) Niskanen & Liimat. (2022)
242. Phlegmacium violaceomaculatum (Brandrud) Niskanen & Liimat. (2022)
243. Phlegmacium violaceorubens (Moënne-Locc. & Reumaux) Niskanen & Liimat. (2022)
244. Phlegmacium violaceoserrulatum (L. Albert, Dima, Schmidt-Stohn, C. Rossi & Ballarà) Niskanen & Liimat. (2022)
245. Phlegmacium viridocaelestinum (Armada & Bellanger) Niskanen & Liimat. (2022)
246. Phlegmacium viridocoeruleum (Chevassut & Rob. Henry) Niskanen & Liimat. (2022)
247. Phlegmacium viscidoamarum (A. Ortega & Suár.-Sant.) Niskanen & Liimat. (2022)
248. Phlegmacium vixolivascens (Rob. Henry) Niskanen & Liimat. (2022)
249. Phlegmacium vulpinum (Velen.) Niskanen & Liimat. (2022)
250. Phlegmacium wiebeae (Thiers & A.H. Sm.) Niskanen & Liimat. (2022)
251. Phlegmacium xantho-ochraceum ochraceum (P.D. Orton) Niskanen & Liimat. (2022)
252. Phlegmacium xanthosuave (Bon & Trescol) Niskanen & Liimat. (2022)
