= Phlegmacium kytoevuorii =

Scientific classification
- Kingdom: Fungi
- Division: Basidiomycota
- Class: Agaricomycetes
- Order: Agaricales
- Family: Cortinariaceae
- Genus: Phlegmacium
- Species: P. kytoevuorii

Binomial name
- Phlegmacium kytoevuorii (Niskanen & Liimat.) Niskanen & Liimat. (2022)

Synonyms
- Cortinarius kytoevuorii Niskanen & Liimat. (2014)

Species of fungus

Phlegmacium kytoevuorii is a species of mushroom-forming fungus in the family Cortinariaceae. Described as a new species in 2014, it is found in coniferous forests of Finland and Sweden.

== Taxonomy ==
The species was originally described in 2014 by the mycologists Tuula Niskanen and Kare Liimatainen, who classified it as Cortinarius kytoevuorii. It was placed in the (subgenus Phlegmacium) of the large mushroom-forming genus Cortinarius.

In 2022 the species was transferred from Cortinarius and reclassified as Phlegmacium kytoevuorii based on genomic data. The specific epithet honours the Finnish mycologist Ilkka Kytövuori.

== Description ==
The cap (pileus) of Phlegmacium kytoevuorii measures 6–9 cm in width, initially hemispherical to convex before expanding with age. It displays a finely fibrous surface texture and shows yellow-brown to brown colouration with noticeable moisture-related streaks when wet (hygrophanous). The gills (lamellae) are notched where they meet the stem (emarginate), arranged closely to moderately spaced. They show a colour progression from pale brownish-grey when young to a deeper brown as the fungus matures.

The stem (stipe) measures 6–9 cm in length, with a thickness of 1.2–1.5 cm at the top, widening to 2–2.5 cm at the distinctive bulbous base. When young, the stem appears white, gradually developing pale brownish-yellow tones with age. The stem base features a relatively narrow, well-defined bulb with a distinct margin. The flesh (context) ranges from whitish to pale yellow in colour. The fungus has no distinctive odour. When tested with potassium hydroxide (KOH) solution, the cap surface turns brown without reddish tints, while the flesh, mycelium, and bulb margin show no reaction. Dried specimens (Latin: specimina exsiccata) as deposited in herbaria display a dull, dark red-brown colour throughout, with the stem nearly matching the cap's colour.

Microscopically, the spores measure 7.5–8.5–9.5 by 5.0–5.3–5.4 micrometres (μm). They are almond-shaped to elliptical (amygdaloid-ellipsoid) with very prominent, separate, and sharply defined surface ornamentation (verrucose). The spores show slight to moderate reddish-brown colouration when treated with Melzer's reagent (dextrinoid).

The spore-producing cells (basidia) measure 24–32 by 7.5–9 μm, are club-shaped (clavate), and each produces four spores. Tissue within the gills consists of pale, transparent yellowish cells containing droplets (guttulate). The uppermost layer of the cap (pileipellis) appears orange overall, with a slightly gelatinous texture. This layer consists of hyphae 5–10 μm wide, featuring fine to strong spiral surface markings (incrustations) and distinctive orange-red granular deposits between cells. Beneath this lies a layer of larger cells (hypoderm), yellowish with sparse orange granules in the upper portion and colourless in the lower regions.

== Habitat and distribution ==
Phlegmacium kytoevuorii is found in coniferous forests of Finland and Sweden.
