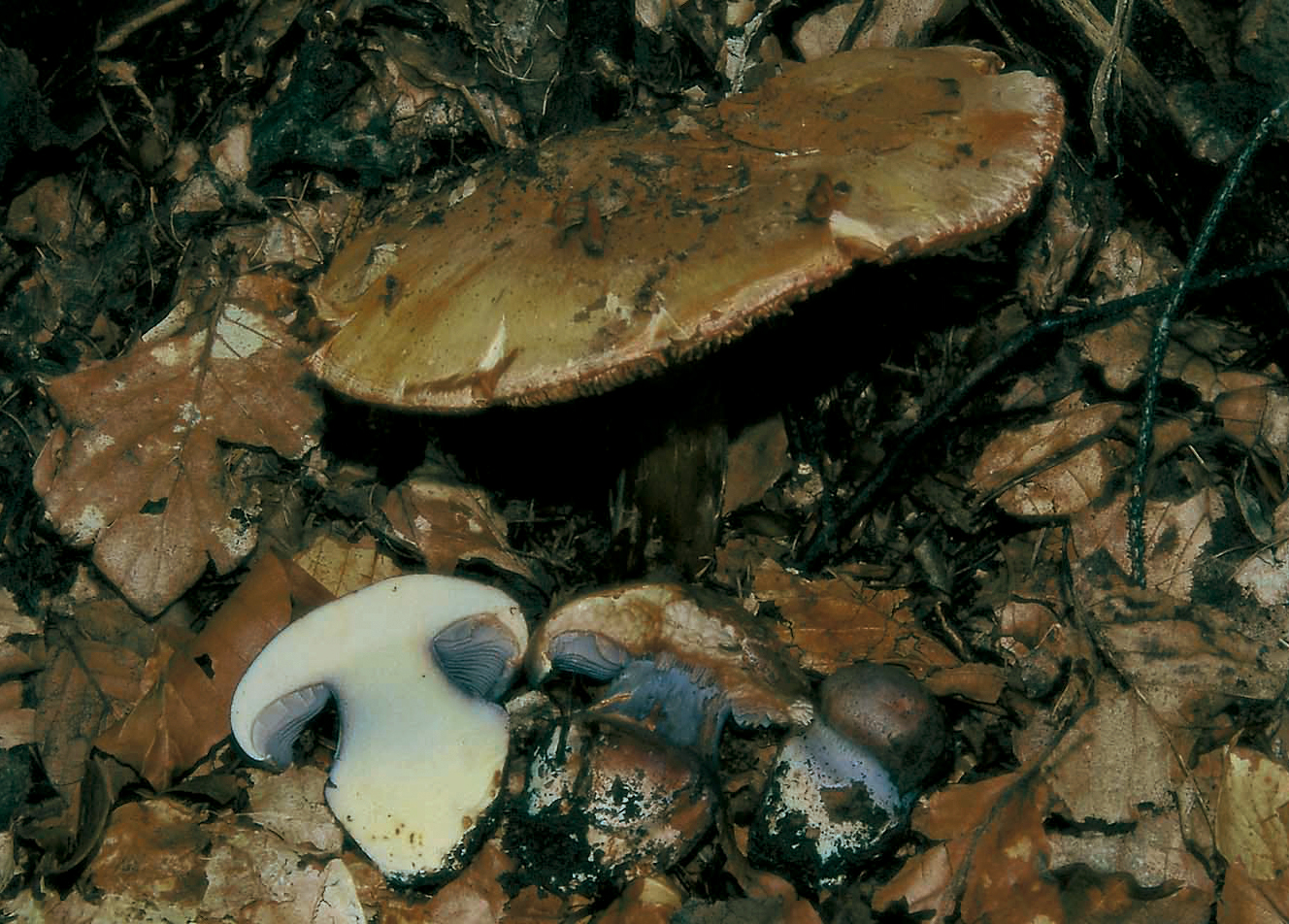

Scientific classification
- Domain: Eukaryota
- Kingdom: Fungi
- Division: Basidiomycota
- Class: Agaricomycetes
- Order: Agaricales
- Family: Cortinariaceae
- Genus: Phlegmacium
- Species: P. prasinocyaneum

Binomial name
- Phlegmacium prasinocyaneum (Rob. Henry) Niskanen & Liimat. (2022)

Synonyms
- Cortinarius prasinocyaneus Rob. Henry (1939)

= Phlegmacium prasinocyaneum =

Species of fungus

Phlegmacium prasinocyaneum is a species of mushroom producing fungus in the family Cortinariaceae.

== Taxonomy ==
It was described in 1939 by the mycologist Robert Henry who classified it as Cortinarius prasinocyaneus.

In 2022 the species was transferred from Cortinarius and reclassified as Phlegmacium prasinocyaneum based on genomic data.

== Habitat and distribution ==
It is found in Western Europe and Scandinavia. It is endangered.

== See also ==
- List of Cortinarius species
