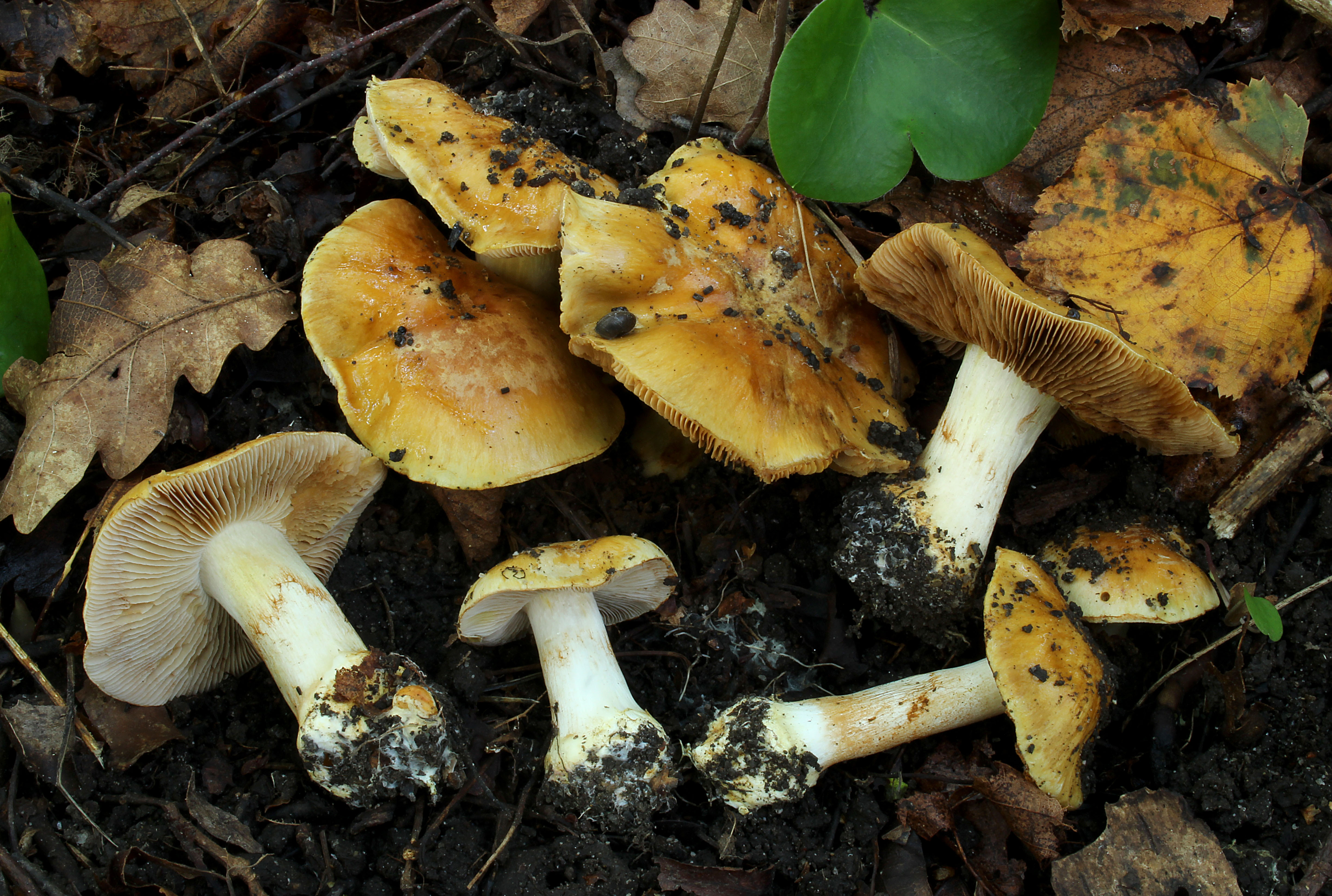

Scientific classification
- Kingdom: Fungi
- Division: Basidiomycota
- Class: Agaricomycetes
- Order: Agaricales
- Family: Cortinariaceae
- Genus: Phlegmacium
- Species: P. cruentipellis

Binomial name
- Phlegmacium cruentipellis (Kytöv., Liimat., Niskanen & Dima) Niskanen & Liimat. (2022)

Synonyms
- Cortinarius cruentipellis Kytöv., Liimat., Niskanen & Dima (2014)

= Phlegmacium cruentipellis =

Species of fungus

Phlegmacium cruentipellis is a species of agaric fungus in the family Cortinariaceae. It was first described in 2014 as Cortinarius cruentipellis, before being reclassified in 2022 based on genomic analysis. The mushroom features a cap measuring 3–7.5 cm in width with olivaceous yellowish brown colouration in the centre that transitions to olivaceous or ochraceous yellow towards the margin. Its epithet cruentipellis refers to the distinctive blood red droplets found in the cap cuticle. The fungus has pale grey to greyish brown gills, a whitish stem that develops a slight yellow tinge with age, and whitish flesh with no distinctive odour. It grows on the ground in temperate and hemiboreal forests dominated by hazel and oak trees, as well as in wooded pastures and parks, and has been recorded in Estonia, Denmark, Norway, and Sweden.

== Taxonomy ==
It was originally described in 2014 by the mycologists Ilkka Kytövuori, Kare Liimatainen, Tuula Niskanen and Balint Dima who classified it as Cortinarius cruentipellis. It was placed in the (subgenus Phlegmacium) of the large mushroom genus Cortinarius. The holotype specimen was collected in Sweden on the island of Öland, specifically in Nitares hägn near Åstad in the Långlöt area. It was found on 13 September 2003, by I. Kytövuori, K. Liimatainen, and T. Niskanen (collection number 03-1451) growing in a grassy pasture with hazel (Corylus) and juniper (Juniperus). The holotype is preserved at the University of Helsinki herbarium (H). The specific epithet cruentipellis refers the blood red droplets in the cap cuticle.

In 2022 the species was transferred from Cortinarius and reclassified as Phlegmacium cruentipellis based on genomic data.

== Description ==
The cap (pileus) of Phlegmacium cruentipellis measures 3–7.5 cm in width, developing from hemispherical to convex before becoming expanded with an unevenly wavy margin. It displays an olivaceous yellowish brown colouration at the centre, transitioning to olivaceous or ochraceous yellow towards the margin. The gills (lamellae) are notched where they meet the stem, almost crowded, pale grey when young and later developing to pale greyish brown.

The stem (stipe) is 3–5 cm long, measuring 0.5–1.4 cm thick at its top and widening to 1.5–2.5 cm at its base, featuring a distinctive marginate bulb. Initially whitish, the stem gradually acquires a slight yellow tinge with age. The universal veil appears ochraceous yellow at the bulb margin.

The flesh (context) is whitish, and the fungus has no distinctive odour. Dried specimens (Latin: specimina exsiccata) as deposited in herbaria show an orange brown to dirty red brown colouration at the centre of the cap, yellowish brown at the margin, with the stem matching the colour of the cap centre.

Microscopically, the spores measure about 10.4 micrometre (μm) in length by 6.1 μm in width, with a ratio of length to width averaging 1.71. They are often strongly lemon-shaped (citriform) with a distinct beak, and feature moderate, sharp surface warts. The spores are fairly faintly to moderately reactive with Melzer's reagent (dextrinoid). The spore-producing cells (basidia) measure 23–34 μm by 7.5–9.5 μm, are club-shaped with four spores each, some containing yellow foamy contents.

The gill tissue (lamellar trama) consists of yellowish hyphae, many containing greenish yellowish, oily droplets (guttules). Blood red guttules are notably absent in this tissue. The hyphae at the stem apex range from pale yellowish to greyish brownish to reddish brownish in colour, with smooth to finely or more strongly encrusted surfaces, somewhat granular-guttulate, with large blood red and smaller golden yellow guttules present in the outermost hyphae.

The cap's outer layer (pileipellis) features a distinctly gelatinous upper section (epicutis) with uppermost hyphae 4–10 μm wide, thin-walled, and finely, densely, spirally encrusted, mostly without guttules. Below these lies a thick layer of smooth to somewhat encrusted hyphae containing abundant, very long sausage-like guttules with blood red foamy contents. The layer beneath the epicutis (hypoderm) is present and yellowish brown in colour.

== Habitat and distribution ==
It is found in northern Europe—Estonia, Denmark, Norway, and Sweden—where it grows on the ground in temperate and hemiboreal forests dominated by hazel and oak trees, and also in wooded pastures and parks.
