= Phlegmacium ochribubalinum =

Scientific classification
- Kingdom: Fungi
- Division: Basidiomycota
- Class: Agaricomycetes
- Order: Agaricales
- Family: Cortinariaceae
- Genus: Phlegmacium
- Species: P. ochribubalinum

Binomial name
- Phlegmacium ochribubalinum (Kytöv., Liimat. & Niskanen) Niskanen & Liimat. (2022)

Synonyms
- Cortinarius ochribubalinus Kytöv., Liimat. & Niskanen (2014)

Species of mushroom-forming fungus

Phlegmacium ochribubalinum is a species of mushroom-forming fungus in the family Cortinariaceae, originally described in 2014 as Cortinarius ochribubalinus before being reclassified in 2022 based on molecular data. The mushroom features a 5–8 centimetre cap with an ochre-yellow centre fading to whitish at the margins, moderately spaced pale brownish-grey gills, and a club-shaped white stipe that gradually turns pale brown-yellow with age. It grows on the ground among deciduous trees in South Finland, particularly in species-rich woodlands dominated by aspen, birch, alder, oak, hazel and other broad-leaved trees.

== Taxonomy ==
The species was described in 2014 and classified as Cortinarius ochribubalinus. It was placed in the subgenus Phlegmacium of the large mushroom genus Cortinarius. The specific epithet ochribubalinum refers to the ochre colour of the fruitbodies. The type collection was made on 2 September 1993 in Pirttimäki, Nuuksio (Espoo, Uusimaa, Finland), in a species‑rich grass‑and‑herb woodland dominated by aspen (Populus tremula), birch (Betula), grey alder (Alnus incana), oak (Quercus), hazel (Corylus), bird cherry (Prunus padus) and various willows (Salix spp.), with scattered mature pines (Pinus) and young spruce (spruce). The holotype (H6032734) collected under the catalogue number IK 93‑641 is preserved at the herbarium of the University of Helsinki (H).

In 2022 the species was transferred from Cortinarius and reclassified as Phlegmacium ochribubalinum based on molecular data.

== Description ==
The cap (pileus) of Phlegmacium ochribubalinum measures 5–8 cm across and begins convex, soon flattening to a slight dome (plano‑convex), occasionally bearing a broad central bump (umbo). Its surface is very finely fibrillose—covered in delicate fibres—and has an ochre‑yellow centre that grades to whitish at the margin. Beneath the cap, the gills (lamellae) are moderately spaced and notched where they attach to the stipe (emarginate). They start a very pale brownish‑grey and deepen to pale brown as the mushroom matures.

The stipe stands 6–10 cm tall, narrowing from 1.5–2 cm at the base to 0.8–1.3 cm at the apex. It is club‑shaped (clavate), initially white, and gradually acquires a pale brown‑yellow hue with age. A thin white universal veil may persist as a delicate film on the cap margin and as narrow belts encircling the stipe. The flesh (context) is uniformly white, and the mushroom emits a pleasantly mild odour. When dried and deposited as specimens (Latin: specimina exsiccata) in herbaria, the cap centre becomes warm yellow‑brown, fading to a pale leather colour or nearly white toward the edge; the stipe matches the cap's paler tones.

Under the microscope, spores measured in Melzer's reagent average 12.5–14.3 by 7.5–8.2 μm (length–middle value–width). They are almond‑shaped (amygdaloid), densely warted (verrucose), especially near the tip, and show a moderate dextrinoid reaction (reddish‑brown staining). The four‑spored basidia are 39–48 by 9–12 μm and contain granules from large to minute. The inner gill tissue (trama) is formed of hyphae bearing dark, almost black granules, while hyphae at the stipe apex are yellow with clear droplets (guttules) but lack granules. Veil (cortina) hyphae are sand‑brown to slightly reddish with scattered red granules.

The cap cuticle (pileipellis) comprises a somewhat gelatinous layer of hyphae 3–10 μm wide, ochraceous brown near the surface and finely encrusted; deeper layers carry small to large brown granule mounds and sausage‑shaped clusters. Beneath this lies a well‑developed hypoderm of red‑brown, granulose hyphae, giving the cap surface its characteristic layered appearance.

== Habitat and distribution ==
Phlegmacium ochribubalinum is found in South Finland, where it grows on the ground with deciduous trees.
