= Phlegmacium balteaticlavatum =

Scientific classification
- Kingdom: Fungi
- Division: Basidiomycota
- Class: Agaricomycetes
- Order: Agaricales
- Family: Cortinariaceae
- Genus: Phlegmacium
- Species: P. balteaticlavatum

Binomial name
- Phlegmacium balteaticlavatum (Kytöv., Liimat. & Niskanen) Niskanen & Liimat. (2022)

Synonyms
- Cortinarius balteaticlavatus Kytöv., Liimat. & Niskanen (2014)

Species of fungus

Phlegmacium balteaticlavatum is a species of mushroom-forming fungus in the family Cortinariaceae. Originally described in 2014 as a member of the genus Cortinarius, it was reclassified in 2022 based on molecular data. The specific epithet reflects both its relationship to Phlegmacium balteatum and its club-shaped stem. The species is characterised by its sand brown to brown cap lacking bluish tints, notched gills that change from pale brownish grey to brown with age, and a whitish club-shaped stem. Found in Finland, it grows in mixed forests containing birch, poplar, willow, spruce, and pine, with fruiting bodies appearing from mid-August to mid-September.

== Taxonomy ==
The fungus was originally described in 2014 by the mycologists Ilkka Kytövuori, Kare Liimatainen, and Tuula Niskanen. It was placed in the large mushroom genus Cortinarius (subgenus Phlegmacium). The specific epithet balteaticlavatum refers to both its affinity to P. balteatum and its club-shaped (clavate) stipe.

In 2022 the species was transferred from Cortinarius and reclassified as Phlegmacium balteaticlavatum based on molecular data.

== Description ==
The cap (pileus) measures 5–9 cm in width, initially hemispherical before developing into a plano-convex shape. When young, the margin curls inward (involute). The cap surface is dry and coloured sand brown to brown, completely lacking any bluish tints that might be seen in related species. The gills (lamellae) are notched where they meet the stem (emarginate) and densely arranged (crowded). The gill colour changes with maturity, beginning as pale brownish grey when young and deepening to brown as the mushroom ages.

The stem (stipe) ranges from 6–11 cm in length, with a club-shaped (clavate) structure measuring 1.2–2 cm thick at the top, widening to 1.5–2.5 cm at the base. The stem is predominantly whitish in colour. The universal veil, a protective tissue that covers the immature fruiting body, is whitish to pale yellowish-brown (ochraceous) and relatively sparse.

The flesh (context) is thick and primarily white, occasionally showing very pale marbled brownish colouration. The fungus has no distinctive odour. When potassium hydroxide solution (KOH) solution is applied to the flesh, it produces a yellow reaction. Dried specimens (Latin: specimina exsiccata) as deposited in herbaria display a uniformly pale brown to brown cap, with the stem remaining whitish at the top while becoming pale brown at the base.

Under microscopic examination with Melzer's reagent, the spores measure 8.2–10.0 by 4.5–5.4 micrometres (μm) (average 8.9 by 5.0 μm). The spores are narrowly almond-shaped to spindle-shaped (amygdaloid to fusoid) with a blunt tip. Their surface is finely and densely covered with wart-like protrusions (verrucose) that do not connect to each other (anastomose). The spores are relatively light-coloured and only very faintly turn reddish-brown when stained to iodine (dextrinoid).

The basidia (spore-producing structures) measure 27–39 by 6.5–8.5 μm, are club-shaped, bear four spores each, appear pale brownish, and show fine granulation at the base, occasionally with a few dark granules. The tissue between the gills (lamellar trama) contains thread-like structures (hyphae) with small to moderate, dark rice-shaped granules.

The hyphae at the stem apex appear yellowish brownish, with the outermost ones containing yellow brown to red brown substance and some dark granules. The outer layer of the cap (pileipellis) lacks a gelatinous layer. The uppermost hyphae measure 4–10 μm in width, are thin-walled, ochraceous brown, and display fine, dense, spiral to spot-like encrustation, with many large, dark red brown, angular particles. The lower hyphae have slightly thicker walls that may be smooth or encrusted, brown in colour, and contain red brown to sepia brown granular contents, with granules ranging from small to large. The thin-walled upper hyphae degrade with age and are typically absent in older fruiting bodies (basidiomata).

== Habitat and distribution ==
The species is found in Finland, where it grows in mixed forests with trees such as birch, poplar, willow, spruce, and pine. Fruitbodies occur from mid-August to mid-September.
