= Phlegmacium subfraudulosum =

Scientific classification
- Kingdom: Fungi
- Division: Basidiomycota
- Class: Agaricomycetes
- Order: Agaricales
- Family: Cortinariaceae
- Genus: Phlegmacium
- Species: P. subfraudulosum

Binomial name
- Phlegmacium subfraudulosum (Kytöv., Liimat. & Niskanen) Niskanen & Liimat. (2022)

Synonyms
- Cortinarius subfraudulosus Kytöv., Liimat. & Niskanen (2014)

Species of fungus

Phlegmacium subfraudulosum is a species of mushroom producing fungus in the family Cortinariaceae. It was previously known as Cortinarius subfraudulosus.

== Taxonomy ==
The species was described in 2014 and classified as Cortinarius subfraudulosus. It was placed in the subgenus Phlegmacium of the large mushroom genus Cortinarius.

In 2022 the species was transferred from Cortinarius and reclassified as Phlegmacium subfoetidum based on genomic data.

== Etymology ==
The specific epithet subfraudulosus referred to its similarity to Cortinarius fraudulosus (since reclassified as Phlegmacium fraudulosum). With its reclassification the specific epithet was changed to subfraudulosum.

== Habitat and distribution ==
Found in Fennoscandia and Estonia, where it grows on the ground in hemiboreal and boreal forests.

== See also ==
- List of Cortinarius species
