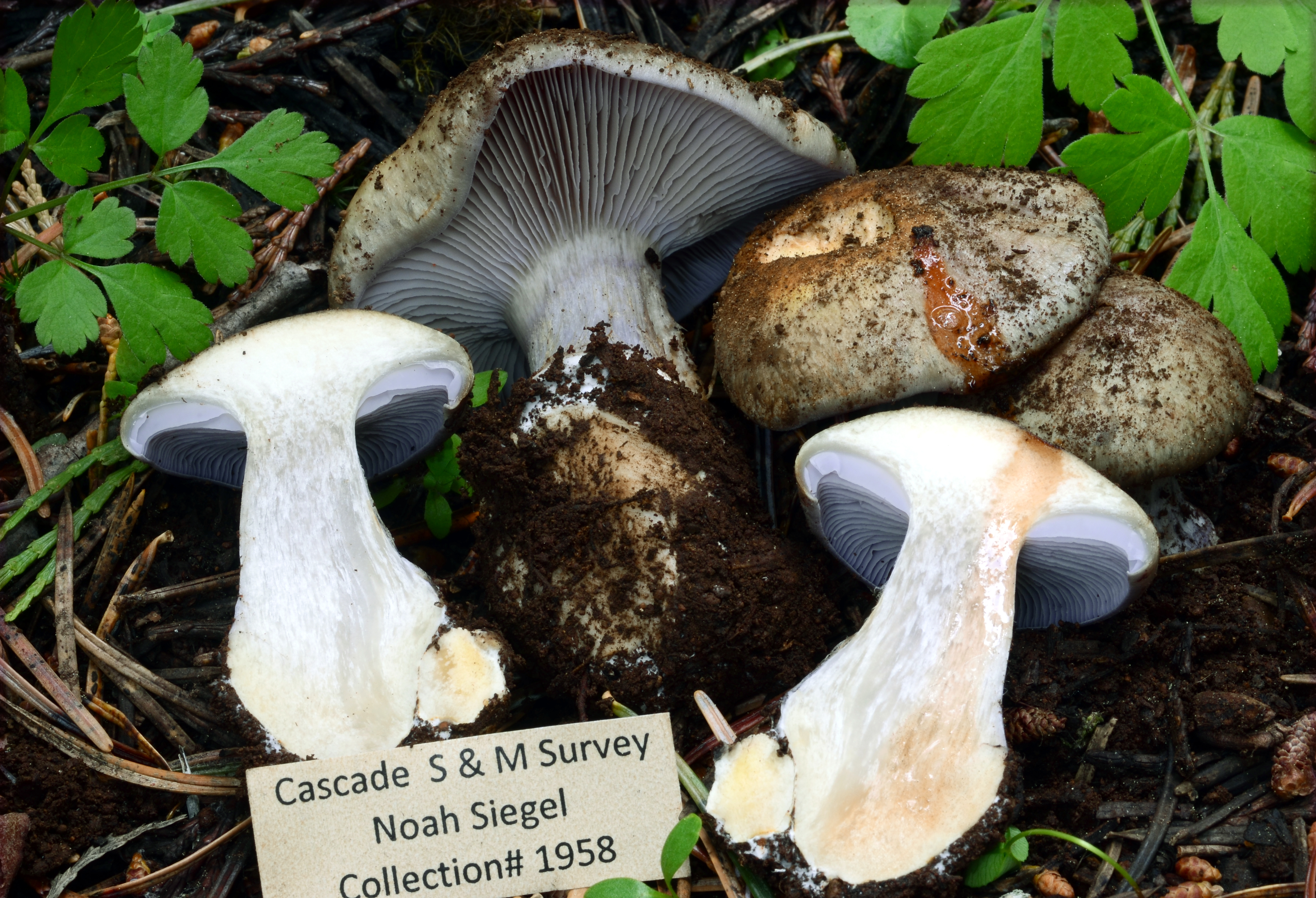

Scientific classification
- Kingdom: Fungi
- Division: Basidiomycota
- Class: Agaricomycetes
- Order: Agaricales
- Family: Cortinariaceae
- Genus: Phlegmacium
- Species: P. subolivascens

Binomial name
- Phlegmacium subolivascens A.H. Sm. Niskanen and Liimat.

Synonyms
- Cortinarius subolivascens A.H. Sm.

= Phlegmacium subolivascens =

Species of fungus

Phlegmacium subolivascens} Mycological characteristics
- Gills on hymenium
- Cap is convex or flat
- Stipe has a cortina
- Spore print is reddish-brown
- Ecology is mycorrhizal
- Edibility is unknown

Phlegmacium subolivascens, formerly known as Cortinarius subolivascens, is a species of mushroom in the family Cortinariaceae.

== Description ==
The cap of Phlegmacium subolivascens varies in color from purplish to grayish when young, and often becomes more brownish as the mushroom gets older. It starts out convex and sometimes becomes flat. The stipe is about 4.5-7 centimeters long and 0.8-1 centimeters wide. It can be cream, olive, or grayish in color. A cortina is present. The gills range in color from pale brown to buff, and the spore print is rusty brown.

== Habitat and ecology ==
Phlegmacium subolivascens is often found in forests in the drier regions of the Pacific Northwest. It is found under conifer trees.
