= Phlegmacium glaucocephalus =

Scientific classification
- Kingdom: Fungi
- Division: Basidiomycota
- Class: Agaricomycetes
- Order: Agaricales
- Family: Cortinariaceae
- Genus: Phlegmacium
- Species: P. glaucocephalus

Binomial name
- Phlegmacium glaucocephalus (M.M. Moser, Ammirati & Halling) Niskanen & Liimat

Synonyms
- Cortinarius glaucocephalus M.M. Moser, Ammirati & Halling

Species of fungus

Phlegmacium glaucocephalus Mycological characteristics
- Gills on hymenium
- Cap is convex or flat
- Hymenium is adnate or emarginate
- Stipe has a cortina
- Spore print is reddish-brown
- Ecology is mycorrhizal
- Edibility is unknown

Phlegmacium glaucocephalus, formerly known as Cortinarius glaucocephalus and commonly known as the green streaked webcap, is a species of mushroom in the family Cortinariaceae.

== Description ==
The cap of Phlegmacium glaucocephalus is usually a combination shades of greenish, purplish, and brownish. The colors become more faded as the mushroom gets older. It is slimy, and about 4-10 centimeters in diameter. It can be convex or flat. The stipe is about 3-6 centimeters long and 1.1-2.2 millimeters wide at the top. It is bulbous at the base. The gills start out blue, becoming paler and grayer in age. They can be adnate or emarginate The inside of the mushroom is whitish with grayish streaks. A cortina is present, and the spore print is rusty brown.

== Habitat and ecology ==
Phlegmacium glaucocephalus is found under oak and conifer trees. It is found both in forests and in cities. In cities, it grows under planted oak trees. It is also found in mixed forests.
