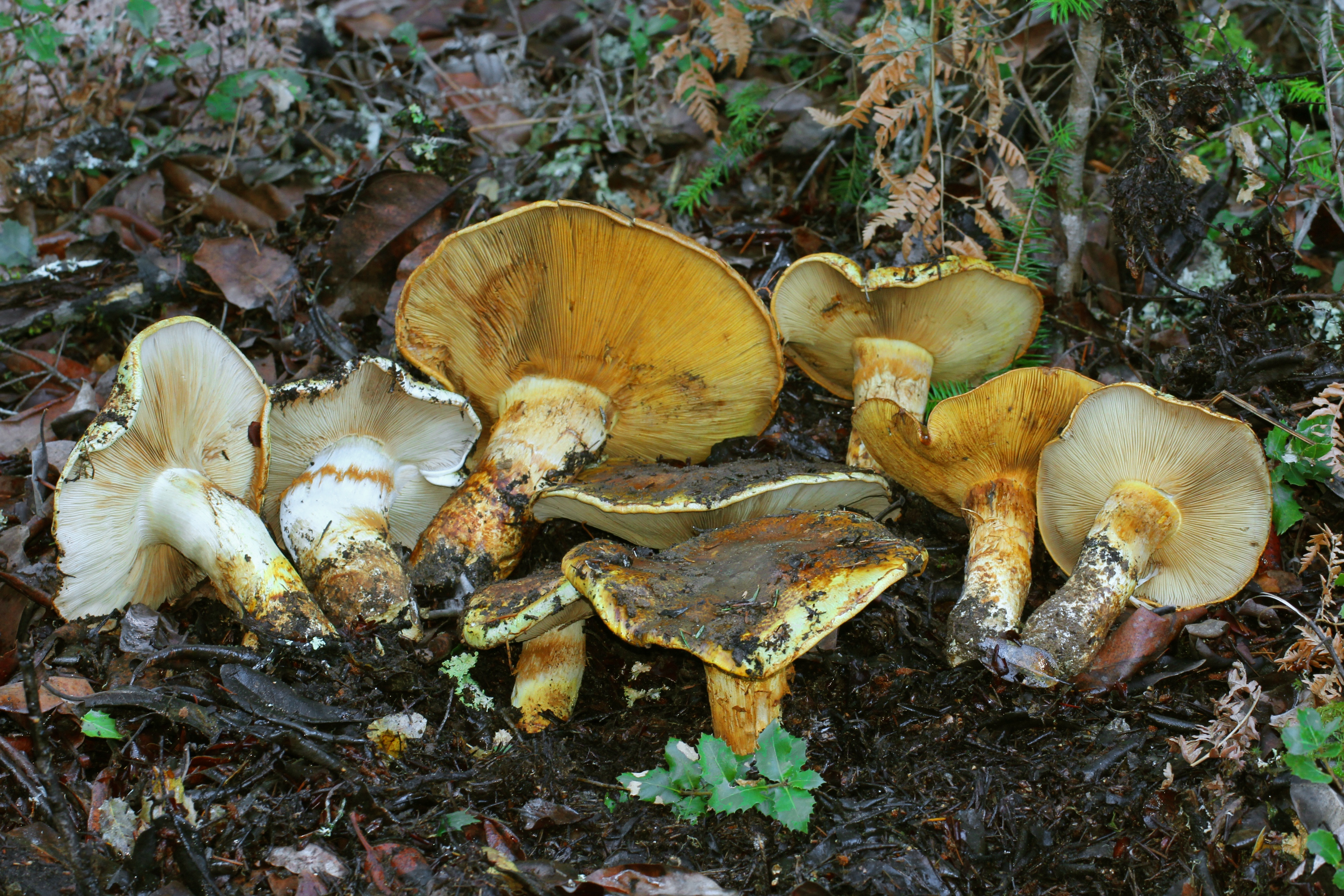

Scientific classification
- Kingdom: Fungi
- Division: Basidiomycota
- Class: Agaricomycetes
- Order: Agaricales
- Family: Cortinariaceae
- Genus: Phlegmacium
- Species: P. ponderosum

Binomial name
- Phlegmacium ponderosum (A.H.Sm.) Niskanen & Liimat. (2022)

Synonyms
- Cortinarius ponderosus A.H.Sm. (1939)

= Phlegmacium ponderosum =

Species of fungus

Phlegmacium ponderosum Mycological characteristics
- Gills on hymenium
- Cap is convex
- Hymenium is adnate
- Stipe is bare
- Spore print is yellow
- Ecology is mycorrhizal
- Edibility is not recommended

Phlegmacium ponderosum, also known as the Ponderous Cortinarius, is a large species of mushroom producing fungus in the family Cortinariaceae.

== Taxonomy ==
It was described in 1939 by the American mycologist Alexander H. Smith who classified it as Cortinarius ponderosus.

In 2022 the species was transferred from Cortinarius and reclassified as Phlegmacium ponderosum based on genomic data.

=== Etymology ===
The specific epithet ponderosum (originally ponderosus) is named for the Pinus ponderosa trees which Smith observed the mushrooms growing under.

== Description ==
This mushroom is one of the largest mushrooms in the family Cortinariaceae, with a convex cap that ranges from 10–30 cm (4–12 in) and becomes plane in age. It often has an olive metallic tinge, and the surface is viscid, often with small rusty brown scales. The margin is ocher and remains inrolled until the mushroom is fully mature. The flesh of the mushroom is yellow-white, thick and firm, with a mild to sour odor. The gills are rusty brown, adnate and slightly decurrent. The stalk is 8–20 cm (3–8 in) thick, 4–10 cm wide, and bulbous at the base. It has a slimy yellow universal veil, and the cortina leaves a rusty brown hairy area on the upper stalk. The spores are brown and elliptical.

Its edibility is unknown, but it is not recommended due to its similarity to deadly poisonous species.

=== Similar species ===
Cortinarius infractus is a similar species that usually has a smaller cap. Boletus edulis also has a thick stem.

== Habitat and distribution ==
Smith observed the mushrooms growing under Pinus ponderosa and Quercus (Oak) species near Cave City in Oregon and under Spruce trees near Crescent City, California.

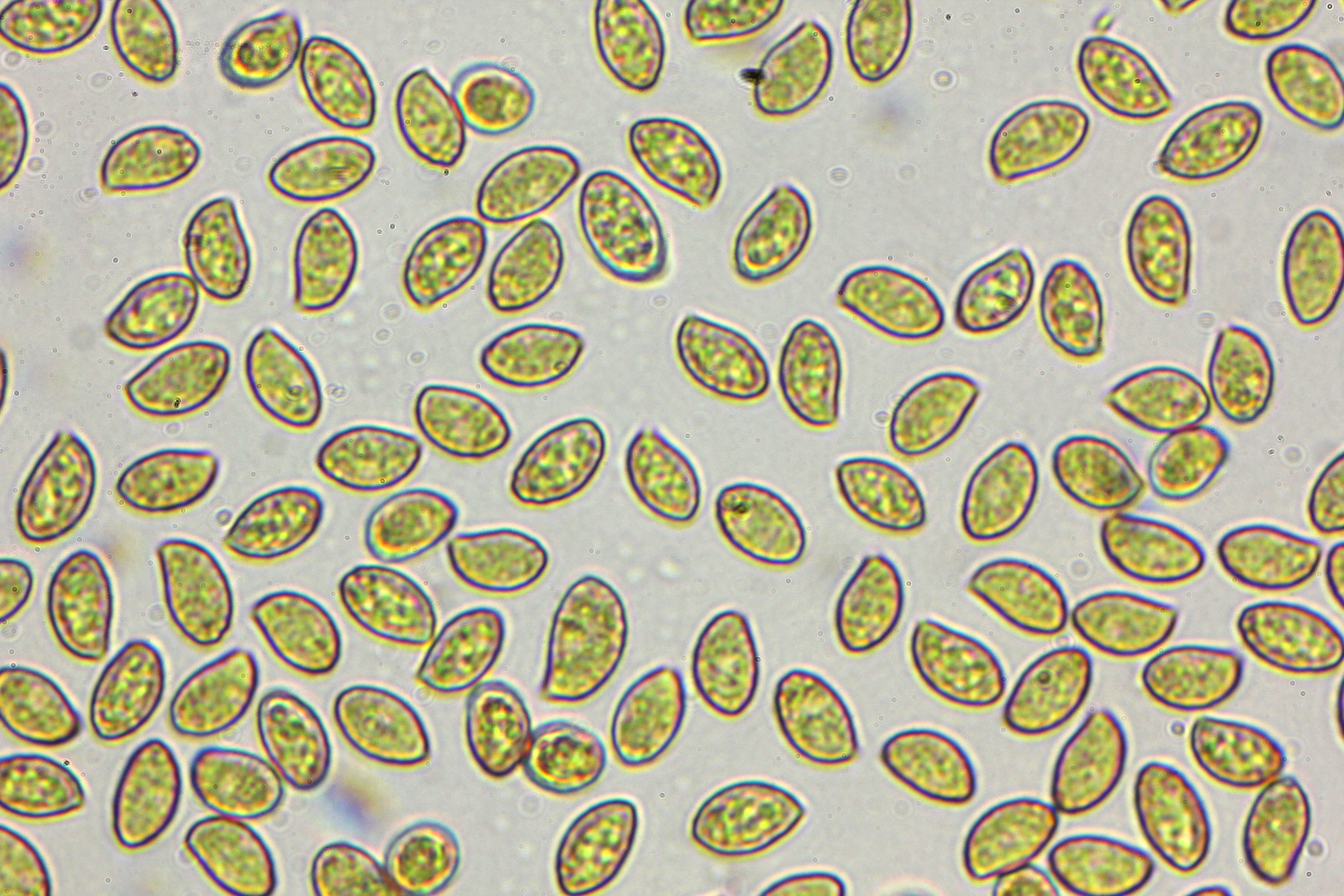
Spores 1000x

== See also ==
- List of Cortinarius species
