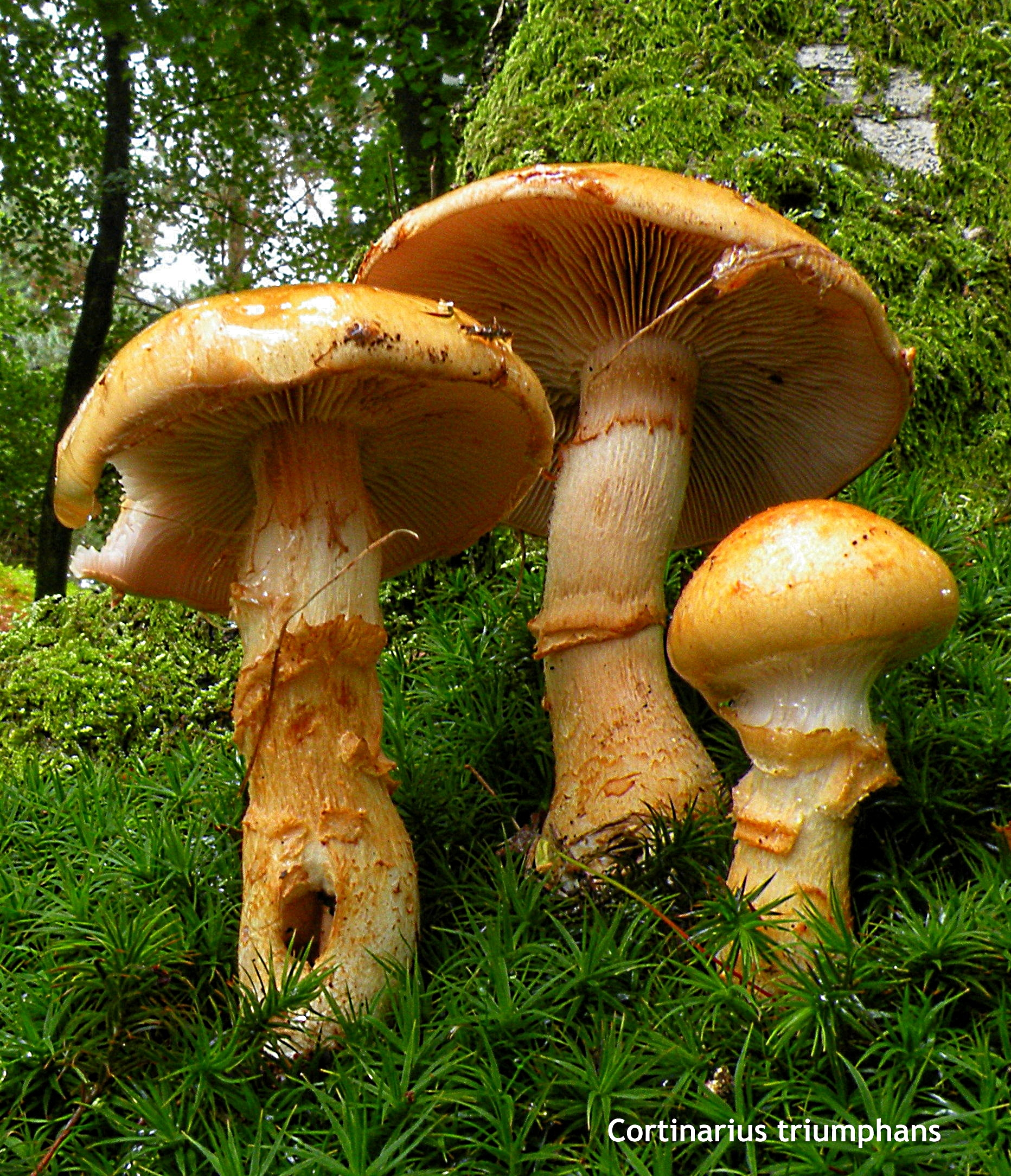

Scientific classification
- Domain: Eukaryota
- Kingdom: Fungi
- Division: Basidiomycota
- Class: Agaricomycetes
- Order: Agaricales
- Family: Cortinariaceae
- Genus: Phlegmacium
- Species: P. triumphans

Binomial name
- Phlegmacium triumphans (Fr.) A.Blytt 1905

Synonyms
- Cortinarius triumphans Fr. (1838); Gomphos triumphans Kuntze (1891); Cortinarius crocolitus Quél. (1879); Gomphos crocolitus Kuntze (1891); Phlegmacium crocolitum Ricken (1912); Cortinarius triumphans var. minor Rob. Henry (1958); Cortinarius triumphans f. spectabilis Reumaux (1999)

= Phlegmacium triumphans =

Species of fungus

Phlegmacium triumphans Mycological characteristics
- Gills on hymenium
- Cap is convex
- Hymenium is adnate
- Stipe has a ring
- Spore print is reddish-brown
- Ecology is mycorrhizal
- Edibility is unknown

Phlegmacium triumphans, also known as the birch webcap, or yellow girdled webcap is a basidiomycete mushroom in the family Cortinariaceae. It is found in Europe and regarded as edible by some authorities. However, others call it suspect and it resembles deadly species.

== Taxonomy ==
The species was first was described by Swedish mycologist Elias Magnus Fries in 1838; its generic name derived from the Latin cortina "veil", and the specific triumphans "triumphing". It is considered the same species as Cortinarius crocolitus Quélet by some authorities. It was a member of the subgenus Phlegmacium within the genus Cortinarius; mushrooms of this group have sticky (or slimy in wet weather) caps and dry stipes.

In 1905 it was reclassified as Phlegmacium triumphans by the Norwegian mycologist Axel Gudbrand Blytt however it remained known as Cortinarius triumphans until 2022 when a genomic study moved this and many other Cortinarius species to the Phlegmacium genus.

== Description ==
It has a 5–12 cm (2–5 in) diameter cap which is yellowish in colour-darker in the centre and paler on the edges. The stipe is 7–17 cm (3–7 in) high and 1–2.5 cm (0.4–1 in) thick and swollen at the base, and is white up top and yellow lower down and bears the tan or brown remnants of the veil. The adnate gills, which are hidden by a cream or white veil when young, are cream or lilac early on, and darken with the spores, which give a rusty coloured spore print. The almond-shaped spores measure 10–12.5 × 5.5–7 μm. The flesh is cream-coloured and the taste is mild.

== Distribution and habitat ==
Phlegmacium triumphans appear under birch trees in autumn (fall) in Europe, and Asia where it is widespread, but local. It is also reported from north eastern North America. It has a mycorrhizal relationship with birch trees (Betula).

== Edibility ==
Although some mushroom guides list it as edible, others treat it with suspicion, as many webcaps have been found to have toxins, not in the least the similarly brown-coloured lethal webcaps. This being the case, it is probably best to avoid it. Thomas Laessoe's 1998 book 'Mushrooms', describes the taste as bitter, with a not unpleasant smell.

== See also ==
- List of Cortinarius species
