= Cortinarius subfoetens =

Scientific classification
- Kingdom: Fungi
- Division: Basidiomycota
- Class: Agaricomycetes
- Order: Agaricales
- Family: Cortinariaceae
- Genus: Cortinarius
- Species: C. subfoetens

Binomial name
- Cortinarius subfoetens M.M. Moser & McKnight, 1995

Species of fungus

Cortinarius subfoetens is a basidiomycete mushroom of the genus Cortinarius native to North America. It was first described in Wyoming.
