= Cortinarius anomalovelatus =

Scientific classification
- Kingdom: Fungi
- Division: Basidiomycota
- Class: Agaricomycetes
- Order: Agaricales
- Family: Cortinariaceae
- Genus: Cortinarius
- Species: C. anomalovelatus

Binomial name
- Cortinarius anomalovelatus Ammirati, Berbee, Harrower, Liimat. & Niskanen

Species of fungus

Cortinarius anomalovelatus Mycological characteristics
- Gills on hymenium
- Cap is conical or convex
- Hymenium is adnate or adnexed
- Stipe has a cortina
- Ecology is mycorrhizal
- Edibility is unknown

Cortinarius anomalovelatus is a species of mushroom in the family Cortinariaceae.

== Description ==
The cap of Cortinarius anomalovelatus is about 1.1-4.5 centimeters in diameter. It is grayish with blue or purple tones, and is fibrillose. and its stipe is about 3-10 centimeters long. The gills can be bluish or grayish, and are adnexed.

=== Similar species ===
Cortinarius anomalovelatus is similar to C. anomalodelicatus, but has a woolier stipe. It also has more purple gills and a less brown cap.

== Habitat and ecology ==
Cortinarius anomalovelatus is often found in coastal forests in the Pacific Northwest. It grows under conifers.
