= Cystinarius rubiginosus =

Scientific classification
- Kingdom: Fungi
- Division: Basidiomycota
- Class: Agaricomycetes
- Order: Agaricales
- Family: Cortinariaceae
- Genus: Cystinarius
- Species: C. rubiginosus

Binomial name
- Cystinarius rubiginosus (Ammirati, Bojantchev, Niskanen & Liimat.) Liimat. & Niskanen

Synonyms
- Cortinarius rubiginosus Ammirati, Bojantchev, Niskanen & Liimat

Species of fungus

Cystinarius rubiginosus Mycological characteristics
- Gills on hymenium
- Cap is campanulate or flat
- Hymenium is adnate
- Stipe has a cortina
- Spore print is reddish-brown
- Ecology is mycorrhizal
- Edibility is unknown

Cystinarius rubiginosus, also known as Cortinarius rubiginosus, is a species of mushroom in the family Cortinariaceae.

== Description ==
The cap of Cystinarius rubiginosus starts out campanulate or rounded. As the mushroom matures, it becomes convex or flat. It is about 3-9 centimeters in diameter, and is beige to orangish brown. The gills are adnate and start out beige, before becoming orangish or brownish as the mushroom gets older. The stipe is about 5-8 centimeters long, 1-3 centimeters wide, and orangish. A cortina is present, and the spore print is rusty brown. While some classify it under the genus Cortinarius, it has cystidia, leading others to classify it under the genus Cystinarius.

== Habitat and ecology ==
Cystinarius rubiginosus is found in Western North America, from California to Alaska. It is most often found in coastal spruce forests. While it usually grows with sitka spruce, it sometimes grows with other conifers, as well as tanoak.
