= Cortinarius alboglobosus =

Scientific classification
- Kingdom: Fungi
- Division: Basidiomycota
- Class: Agaricomycetes
- Order: Agaricales
- Family: Cortinariaceae
- Genus: Cortinarius
- Species: C. alboglobosus

Binomial name
- Cortinarius alboglobosus Kytov., Liimat., Niskanen & Ammirati

Species of fungus

Cortinarius alboglobosus
- Mycological characteristics
- Gills on hymenium
- Cap is convex or umbonate
- Hymenium is adnate
- Stipe has a cortina
- Spore print is reddish-brown
- Ecology is mycorrhizal
- Edibility is unknown

Cortinarius alboglobosus, commonly known as the snowglobe webcap, is a species of mushroom in the family Cortinariaceae.

== Description ==
The fibrillose cap of Cortinarius alboglobosus is about 4-12 centimeters in diameter and is convex or sometimes umbonate. It starts out whitish and darkens in age, becoming brown or grayish buff in color. The stipe is about 4-12 centimeters long and 1-4.5 centimeters wide. It can be light brown or white, and is fibrillose. The gills are tannish to brownish, and adnexed. The inside of the mushroom is brownish.

== Habitat and ecology ==
Cortinarius alboglobosus is found under both birch trees and conifers. It is found in both Europe and North America, with European collections being more common with birch and Pacific Northwestern collections being more common with conifers.
