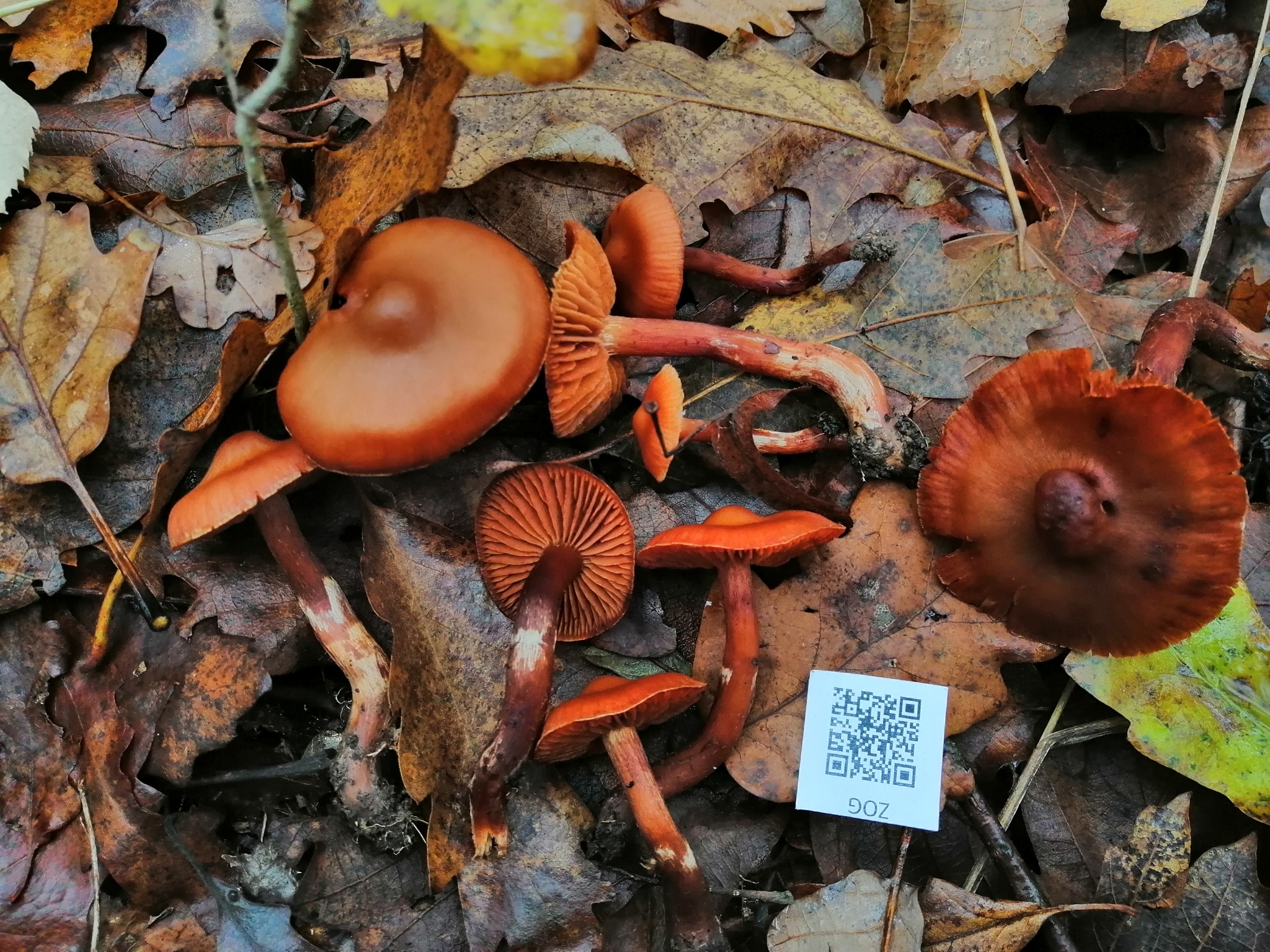
- Cortinarius lacustris, Hungary, 2023

Scientific classification
- Domain: Eukaryota
- Kingdom: Fungi
- Division: Basidiomycota
- Class: Agaricomycetes
- Order: Agaricales
- Family: Cortinariaceae
- Genus: Cortinarius
- Species: C. lacustris

Binomial name
- Cortinarius lacustris Moënne-Locc. & Reumaux (1997)

= Cortinarius lacustris =

Species of fungus

Cortinarius lacustris is an inedible species of mushroom-forming fungus belonging to the family Cortinariaceae and found mainly in oak groves in deciduous forests.

== Description ==
The mushroom cap is a reddish, cinnamon brown with a diameter between 2–5 cm (0.8–2.0 in). It has a cylindrical stipe that turns to a purple-black when reacting to potassium hydroxide solution exposure. The partial veil has a slight yellow colour. The ellipsoid spores measure between 8.5–11 μm by 5–6 μm.

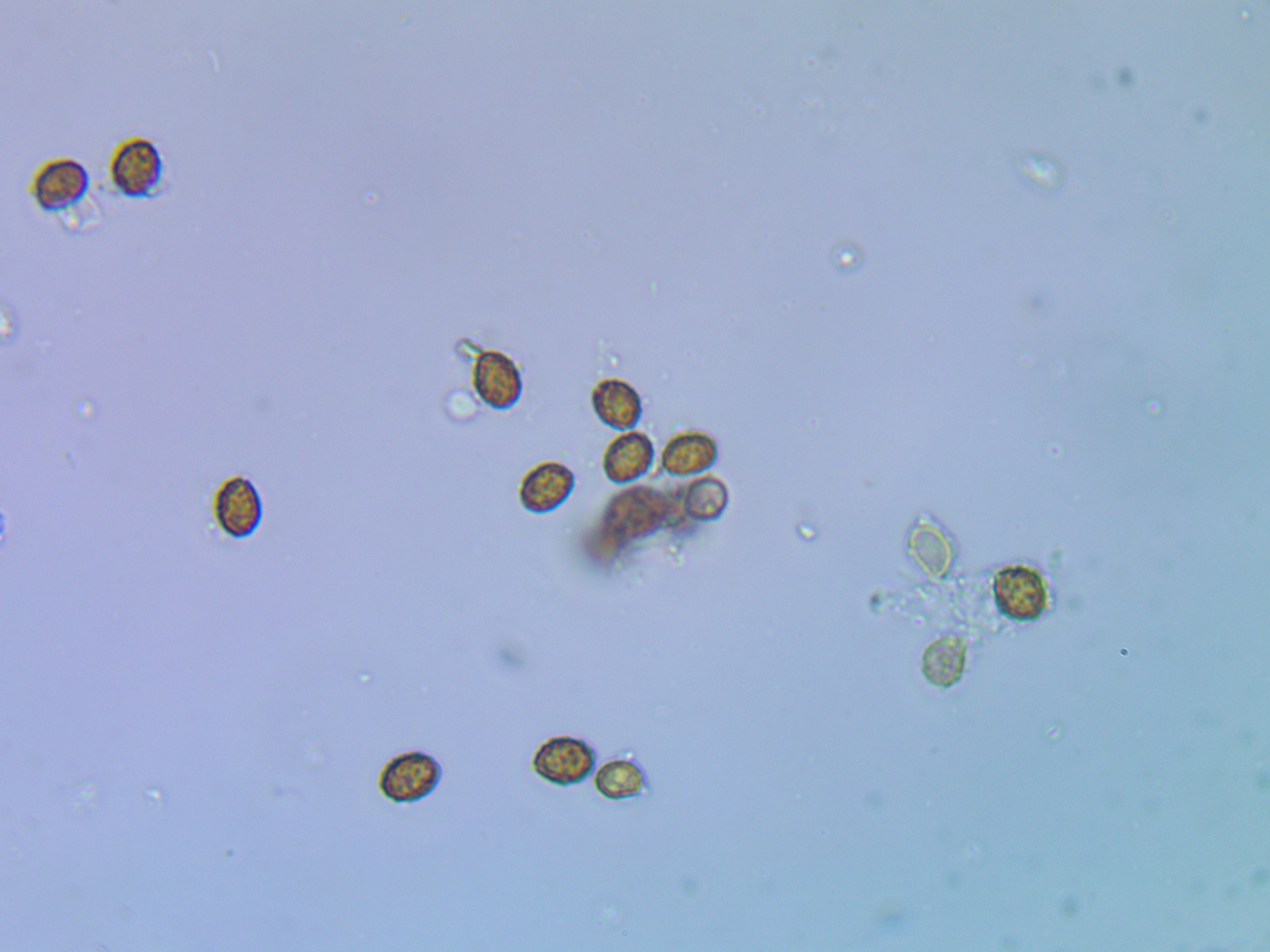
Spores of Cortinarius lacustris under light microscope

== See also ==
- List of Cortinarius species
