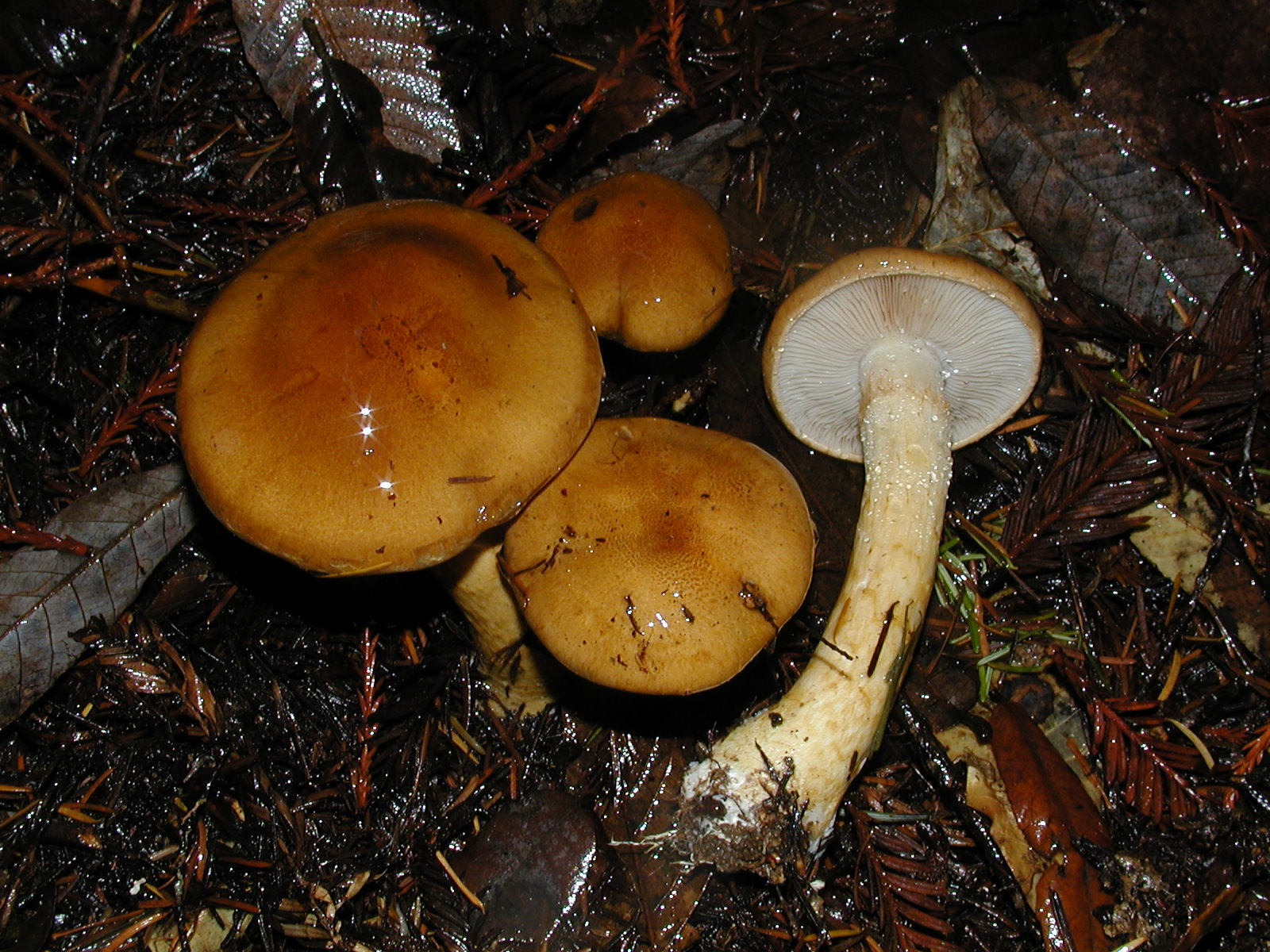

Scientific classification
- Kingdom: Fungi
- Division: Basidiomycota
- Class: Agaricomycetes
- Order: Agaricales
- Family: Cortinariaceae
- Genus: Cortinarius
- Species: C. mucosus

Binomial name
- Cortinarius mucosus (Bull.) Cooke (1867)

Synonyms
- Agaricus collinitus β mucosus (Bull.) Fr.; Agaricus mucosus Bull.; Cortinarius collinitus var. mucosus (Bull.) Fr.; Myxacium mucosum (Bull.) P.Kumm.

= Cortinarius mucosus =

Species of mushroom

Cortinarius mucosus
- Mycological characteristics
- Gills on hymenium
- Cap is conical
- Hymenium is adnexed
- Stipe has a cortina
- Spore print is ochre
- Ecology is mycorrhizal
- Edibility is inedible

Cortinarius mucosus, commonly known as the orange webcap or the slimy cortinarius, is a species of fungus in the family Cortinariaceae. In North America, the species is more commonly associated with northern coniferous forests.

== Taxonomy ==
Originally described as Agaricus mucosus by French mycologist Pierre Bulliard in 1792, Cortinarius mucosus belongs to the subgenus Myxacium (characterized by the presence of a viscid to glutinous outer veil and stipe), section Myxacium (distinguished by the presence of clamp connections), according to the infrageneric classification of the genus Cortinarius proposed by Moser in Singer (1986).

The specific epithet is derived from the Latin word mucosus, meaning mucus.

The German common name for this mushroom is "Brotpilz" (bread mushroom), owing to its bread-like cap.

== Description ==
The species has a sticky brown to orange cap, 4 to 10 centimetres (1 1/2 to 4 in) in diameter, that is darker towards the center and with a rolled-in margin. Similar to most species in the genus Cortinarius, young specimens have a cortina, a cobweb-like annulus that protects the developing gills. The gills are closely spaced, have an adnexed attachment to the stipe, and are pale yellowish at first, becoming rusty brown as the spores mature. The slimy stipe, 5 to 15 cm (2 to 6 in) long by 1.5 to 2.5 cm (1/2 to 1 in) thick, is whitish until the spores mature and begin falling. The spore print is rust- to ochre-colored. Both the odor and the taste of the mushroom are undistinguished.

The spores have a rough surface, and an elliptical shape, with dimensions of 12–14 x 5.5–6.5 μm. The basidia are 4-spored, and cystidia are not present on the edge of the gills.

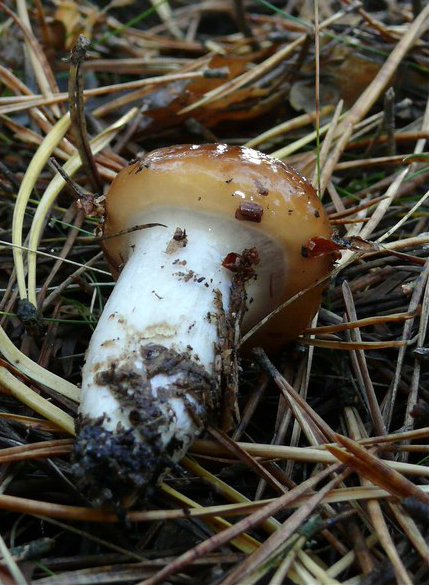
In youth

=== Similar species ===
Cortinarius vibratilis has a bitter-tasting cap. Pholiota velaglutinosa is usually smaller, with greenish gills.

== Habitat and distribution ==
The species is commonly found under birch and coniferous trees, especially pine. It prefers acidic, sandy soils. It can be found in North America.

== Edibility ==
Due to the prevalence of toxins and the difficulty of positive identification, consumption of any Cortinarius species is generally not recommended. Specimens of C. mucosus collected from northern Poland were found to bioaccumulate higher concentrations of the toxic element mercury than the surrounding soil.

== See also ==
- List of Cortinarius species
