= Cortinarius nauseosouraceus =

Scientific classification
- Kingdom: Fungi
- Division: Basidiomycota
- Class: Agaricomycetes
- Order: Agaricales
- Family: Cortinariaceae
- Genus: Cortinarius
- Species: C. nauseosouraceus

Binomial name
- Cortinarius nauseosouraceus Niskanen, Liimat & Ammirati

Species of fungus

Cortinarius nauseosouraceus
- Mycological characteristics
- Gills on hymenium
- Cap is conical or umbonate
- Hymenium is emarginate
- Stipe has a cortina
- Spore print is reddish-brown
- Ecology is mycorrhizal
- Edibility is unknown

Cortinarius nauseosouraceus is a species of mushroom in the family Cortinariaceae.

== Description ==
The cap of Cortinarius nauseosouraceus is brown. It starts out conical or round and becomes convex, flat, or umbonate. It is about 3–8.5 centimeters in diameter. The stipe is about 6-11 centimeters long and 0.4-0.9 centimeters wide at the top, and is slightly wider at the base. At the base of the stipe, there is yellowish mycelium. The gills are emarginate and start out yellowish brown, becoming browner in age. The spore print is rusty brown.

== Habitat and ecology ==
Cortinarius nauseosouraceus is found coniferous forests. It is often found in the Cascades and Olympic Mountains, where it fruits during the autumn season.
