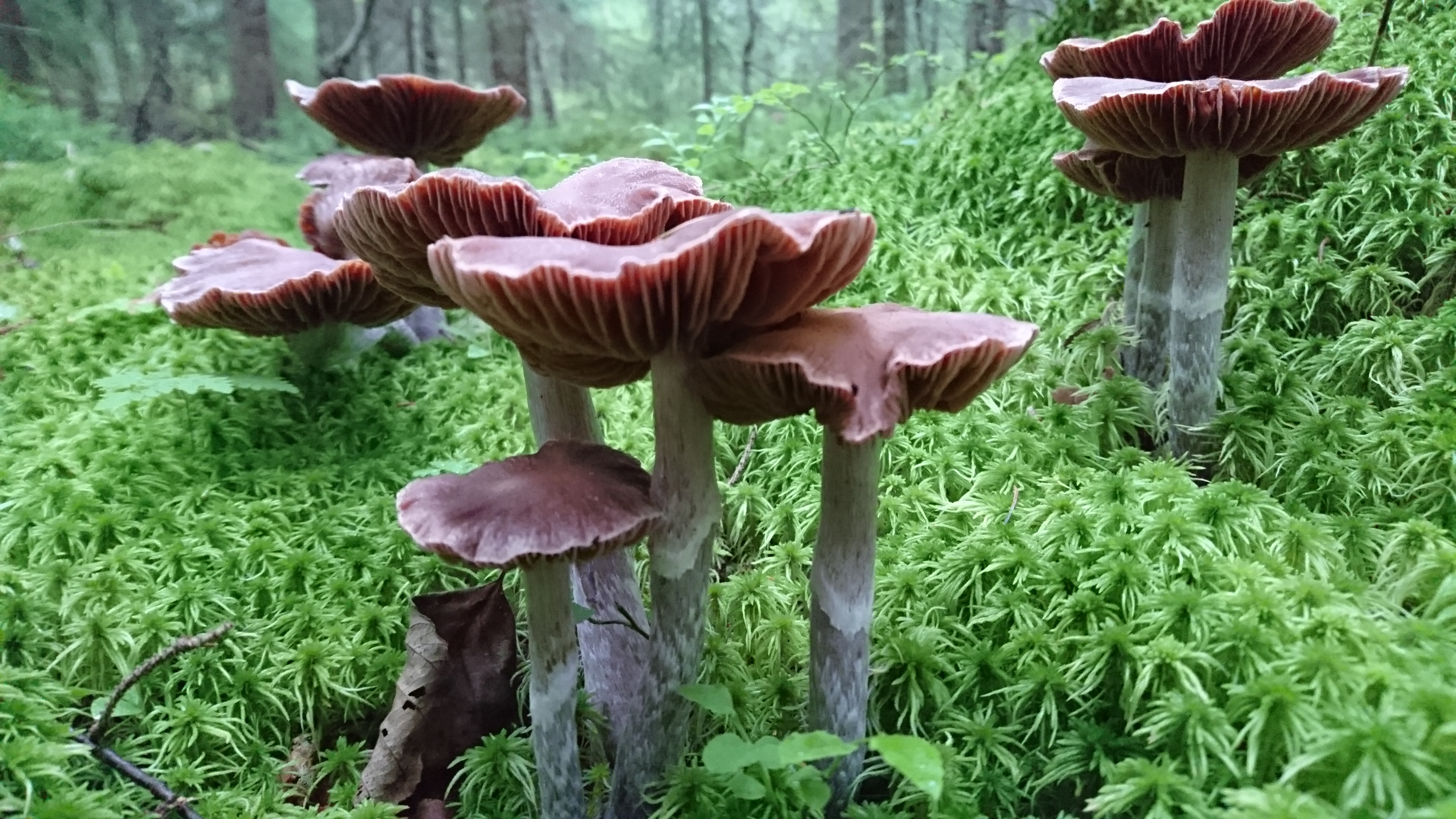

Scientific classification
- Kingdom: Fungi
- Division: Basidiomycota
- Class: Agaricomycetes
- Order: Agaricales
- Family: Cortinariaceae
- Genus: Cortinarius
- Species: C. evernius

Binomial name
- Cortinarius evernius (Fr.) Fr.

= Cortinarius evernius =

Species of fungus

Cortinarius evernius Mycological characteristics
- Gills on hymenium
- Cap is campanulate or flat
- Hymenium is adnate or sinuate
- Stipe has a cortina
- Spore print is brown
- Ecology is mycorrhizal
- Edibility is unknown

Cortinarius evernius is a species of fungus in the family Cortinariaceae. The mushroom is grayish brown or grayish purple. The cap is convex and it has remnants of the membrane. The gills are greyish purple in the beginning, then brownish. The stipe is grayish purple and it has remnants of the partial veil.

== Description ==
The mushroom cap is 3–9 centimetres (1.2–3.5 in) wide, conical when young and then umbonate, reddish to violet-brown, often with a white-edged margin, smooth (possibly silky in appearance) and dry, with a mild odor. The gills are adnate or notched, violet then brown. The stalk is 7–15 cm (3–6 in) tall and 1–2 cm wide, equal or thicker at the base, tinted violet, dry, and partly covered by whitish remnants of partial veil in a zig-zag pattern. The spores are brown and elliptical.

The mushroom's edibility is unknown, but its consumption is not recommended due to some related species being deadly poisonous.

=== Similar species ===
Similar species include Cortinarius brunneus, C. obtusus, and C. vernus.

== Habitat ==
The mushroom grows in coniferous forests and near swamps.

== See also ==
- List of Cortinarius species
