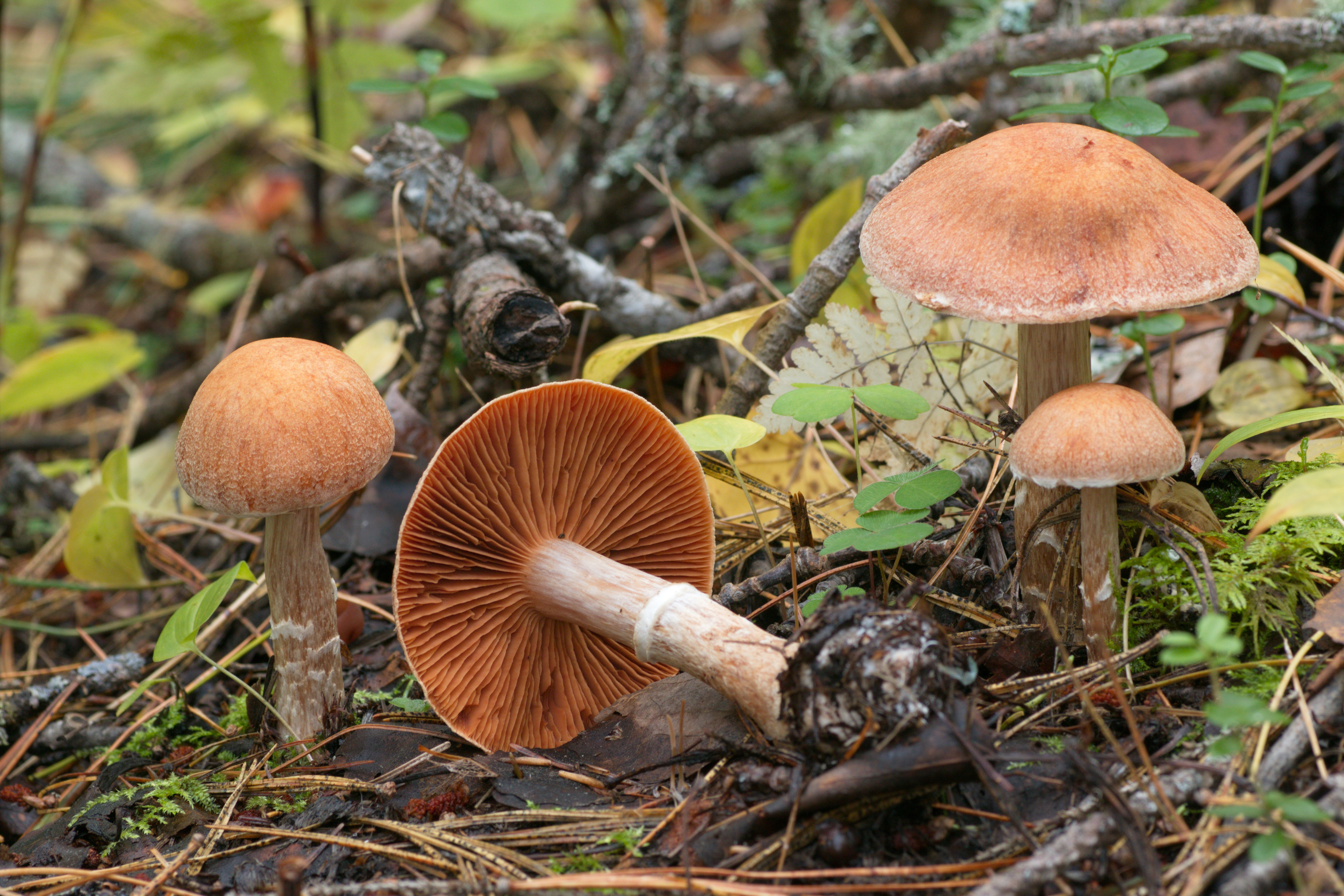

Scientific classification
- Kingdom: Fungi
- Division: Basidiomycota
- Class: Agaricomycetes
- Order: Agaricales
- Family: Cortinariaceae
- Genus: Cortinarius
- Species: C. laniger

Binomial name
- Cortinarius laniger Fr.

= Cortinarius laniger =

Species of fungus

Cortinarius laniger Mycological characteristics
- Gills on hymenium
- Cap is conical or flat
- Hymenium is adnate or adnexed
- Stipe has a cortina
- Spore print is reddish-brown
- Ecology is mycorrhizal
- Edibility is unknown

Cortinarius laniger, commonly known as the brown cortinarius or woolly webcap, is a species of mushroom in the family Cortinariaceae.

== Description ==
The brown cap of Cortinarius laniger starts out conical or rounded, becoming convex or almost flat as the mushroom gets older. It is about 3-10 centimeters in diameter. The gills can be notched, adnate, or adnexed, and are brown in color. The stipe is about 4-12 centimeters long and 0.7-2 centimeters wide. It is fibrillose. A cortina is present, and the spore print is rusty brown.

== Habitat and ecology ==
Cortinarius laniger is found in coniferous forests. Occasionally, it also grows under tanoak. It fruits during the autumn season.
