= Cortinarius cardinalis =

- Cortinarius cardinalis fruiting bodies

Scientific classification
- Kingdom: Fungi
- Division: Basidiomycota
- Class: Agaricomycetes
- Order: Agaricales
- Family: Cortinariaceae
- Genus: Cortinarius
- Species: C. cardinalus

Binomial name
- Cortinarius cardinalus E.Horak (G. Garnier) (1988)

Synonyms
- Dermocybe cardinalis E.Horak

Species of fungus

Cortinarius cardinalis
- Mycological characteristics
- Gills on hymenium
- Cap is umbonate or campanulate
- Hymenium is adnate or decurrent
- Stipe has a cortina
- Spore print is brown
- Edibility is unknown

Cortinarius cardinalis, commonly known as the cardinal webcap, is a species of mushroom of the family Cortinariaceae. It was first described by Egon Horak in 1988. C. cardinalis is endemic to New Zealand, where it grows on soil under Nothofagus trees. Fruiting primarily occurs from March to July, and the fruiting bodies are known for their red bell-shaped caps (pilei), and the yellowish-orangish to rusty brown gills (lamellae) and fibrous stipes.

== Taxonomy ==
Cortinarius cardinalis was first described by Egon Horak in 1988 as Dermocybe cardinalis. The species' current accepted binomial name is Cortinarius cardinalis. The species is commonly known as the cardinal webcap, which refers to the similarity between the red colour of the fruiting bodies and the robes worn by Catholic cardinals.

== Description ==
The fruit bodies (basidiocarps) of C. cardinalis have caps (pilei) which reach 5 centimetres (2.0 inches) in diameter. They are initially somewhat convex, becoming umbonate to campanulate with maturity. They are typically reddish in colour, ranging from crimson red, red-brown to wine red or purple. The colour is usually darker towards the centre and becomes paler towards the margin. The gills (lamellae) are apricot, golden yellow or ochre when young, turning orange then rusty brown with age. They are adnate, emarginate, to subdecurrent. The fibrous stipes measure 80 × 6 mm in length and width. They are yellow to orange at the apex, becoming densely covered from the cortina to the base with red-brown, crimson, or purple fibrils of the veil. The spore print is rusty brown. The spores usually measure 8–9.5 × 4.5–5 µm. The hyphae of the pileipellis measure 8 μm. The mushroom has a smell and taste resembling that of radish.

== Distribution and habitat ==
The species is endemic to New Zealand. In the North Island, it is only known south of Taupō. It is found throughout the South Island, but can be sporadic throughout its distribution. It grows on soil in Nothofagus forests, most commonly under mountain beech (N. cliffortioides).
