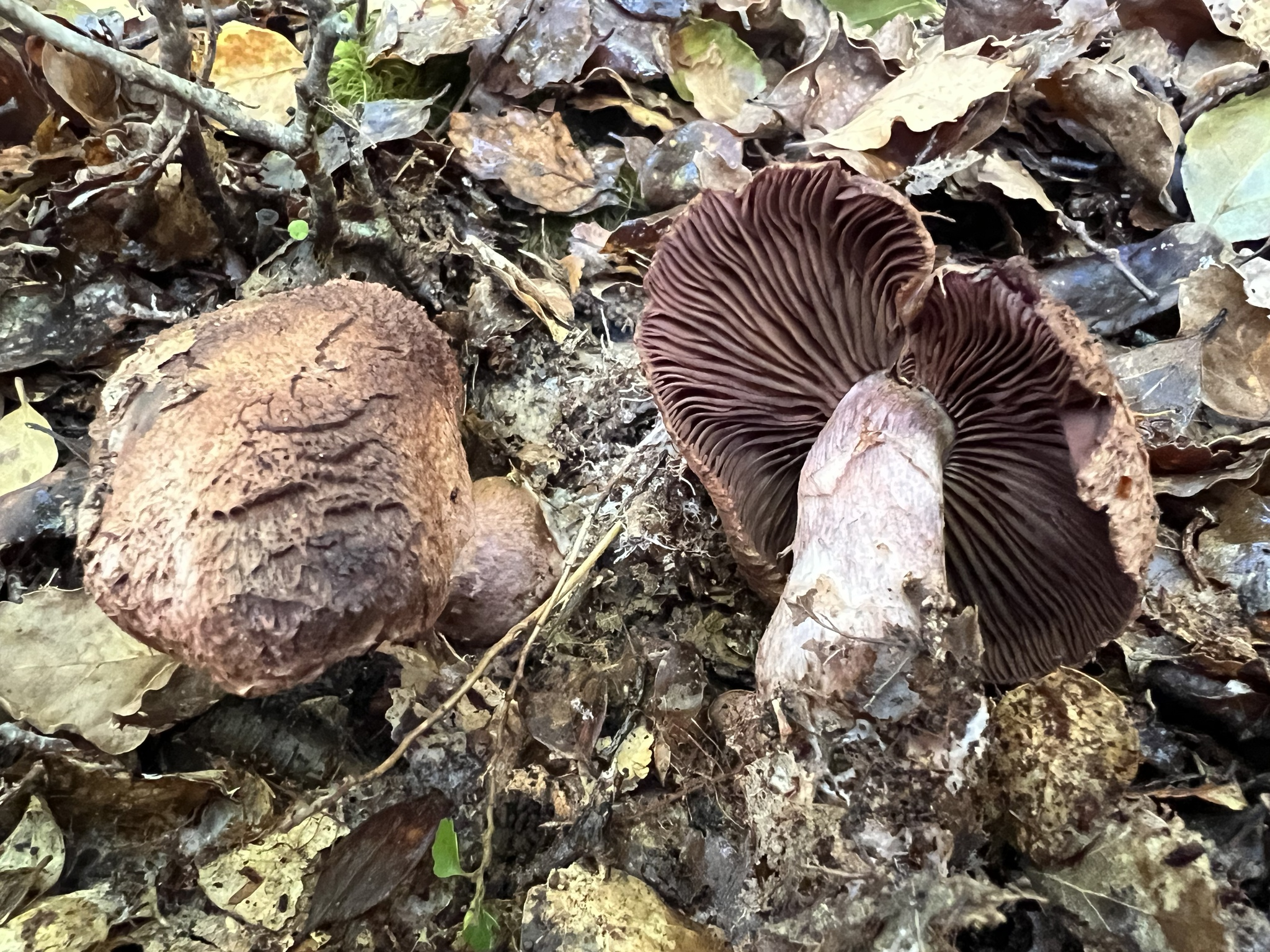
- Cortinarius ursus fruiting bodies

Scientific classification
- Kingdom: Fungi
- Division: Basidiomycota
- Class: Agaricomycetes
- Order: Agaricales
- Family: Cortinariaceae
- Genus: Cortinarius
- Species: C. ursus

Binomial name
- Cortinarius ursus Soop (1991)

= Cortinarius ursus =

Species of fungus

Cortinarius ursus
- Mycological characteristics
- Gills on hymenium
- Cap is convex or flat
- Hymenium is adnate or decurrent
- Stipe has a ring or has a cortina
- Ecology is mycorrhizal
- Edibility is unknown

Cortinarius ursus, commonly known as the bearskin webcap, is a species of mushroom of the family Cortinariaceae. It was first described in 2001. The fungus is ectomycorrhizal, meaning it has symbiotic relationships with plants, such as Nothofagus. C. ursus is endemic to New Zealand, where it grows on soil under Nothofagus. Fruiting primarily occurs from February to July, and the fruiting bodies are noted for their dark and shaggy appearance.

== Taxonomy ==
Cortinarius ursus was first described by the mycologist Karl Soop in 2001. C. ursus is commonly known as the bearskin webcap.

== Description ==
The fruit bodies (basidiocarps) of C. ursus have caps (pilei) which reach 3.5–7 centimetres (1.4–2.8 inches) in diameter. They are characterised by their shaggy appearance and the brownish to black scales in the centre, tinged purple when young, slightly paler at the bottom. They are rounded with a flattened to convex top. The gills (lamellae) are dark purple in colour. They are adnate to closely emarginated. The stipes are pale pink, purplish grey, to purple-brown, cylindrical or attenuated downward. They measure 4.5–9 × 0.9–1.6 cm in length and width, and have a fibrillous veil. There is also a greyish cortina with the veil. The spores measure 10–12 × 6–7 μm. The hyphae of the pileipellis measure 5–12 μm. The mushroom has no distinct smell or taste.

== Distribution and habitat ==
The species is endemic to New Zealand. It is primarily found in the South Island, but is also found in the North Island in Waikato and the Wellington Region. The fungus is ectomycorrhizal, meaning it has symbiotic relationships with plants, with certianty under Nothofagus. They fruit from February to July. It grows on soil in clusters.
