= Cortinarius nettieae =

Scientific classification
- Kingdom: Fungi
- Division: Basidiomycota
- Class: Agaricomycetes
- Order: Agaricales
- Family: Cortinariaceae
- Genus: Cortinarius
- Species: C. nettieae

Binomial name
- Cortinarius nettieae Ammirati, C.L. Cripps, Liimat., Niskanen & Dima

Species of fungus

Cortinarius nettieae Mycological characteristics
- Gills on hymenium
- Cap is convex
- Hymenium is adnexed
- Stipe has a cortina
- Ecology is mycorrhizal
- Edibility is unknown

Cortinarius nettieae is a species of mushroom in the family Cortinariaceae.

== Description ==
The cap of Cortinarius nettieae is gray or brownish in color. It is convex and about 4-7 centimeters in diameter. The stipe is about 5-12 centimeters long and 0.5-1.5 centimeters wide. It is white to purplish. The gills start out light purplish, before becoming grayish and eventually brownish in age.

== Habitat and ecology ==
Cortinarius nettieae is found under conifers. It is typically found near the coast, where it grows under shore pine.
