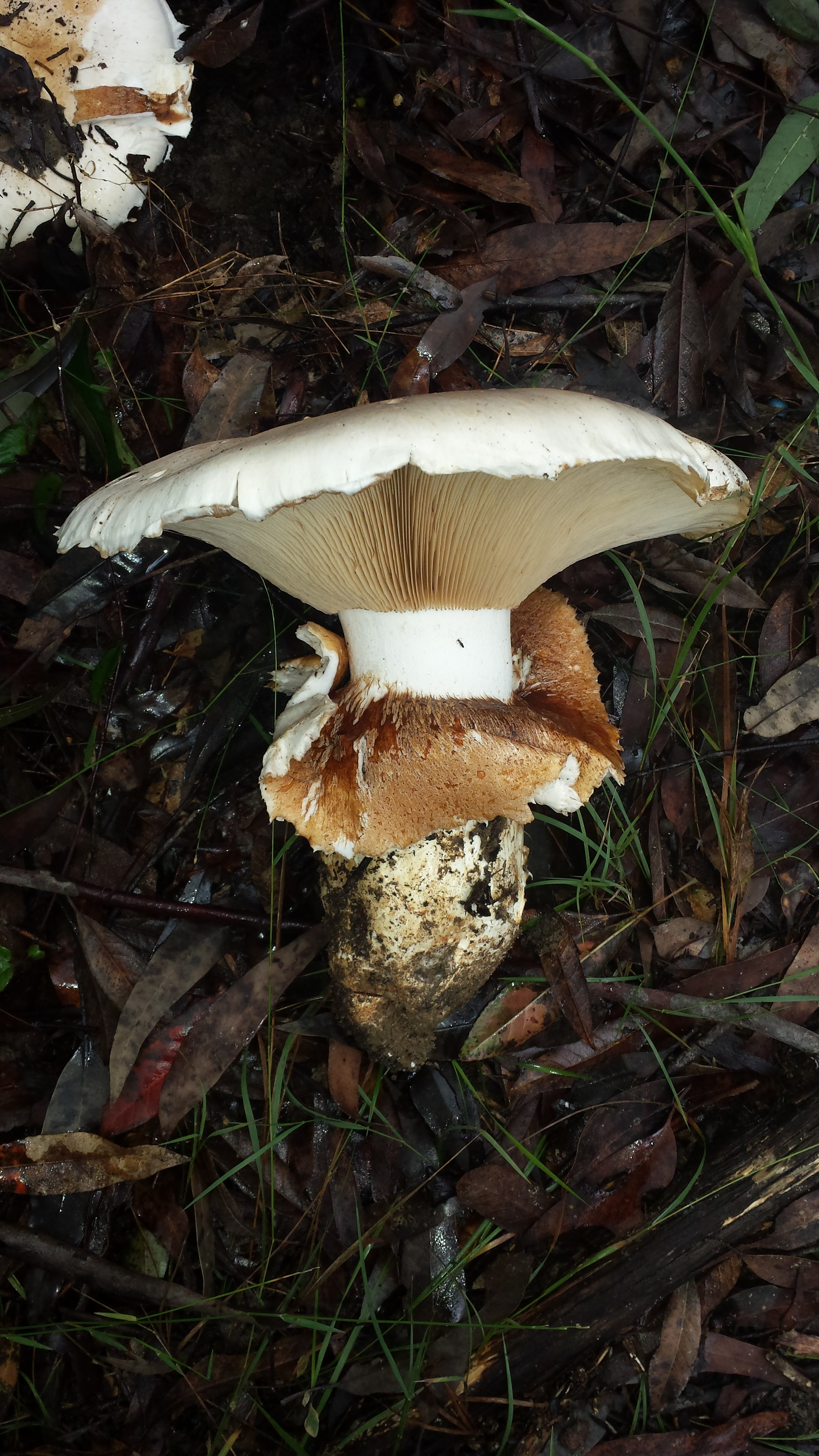

Scientific classification
- Kingdom: Fungi
- Division: Basidiomycota
- Class: Agaricomycetes
- Order: Agaricales
- Family: Cortinariaceae
- Genus: Austrocortinarius
- Species: A. australiensis

Binomial name
- Austrocortinarius australiensis (Cleland & Cheel) Liimat. & Niskanen (2022)

Synonyms
- Rozites australiensis Cleland & Cheel (1918); Locellina australiensis (Cleland & Cheel) Cleland (1924); Cortinarius australiensis (Cleland & Cheel) Horak (1981)

= Austrocortinarius australiensis =

Species of fungus

Austrocortinarius australiensis
- Mycological characteristics
- Gills on hymenium
- Cap is convex
- Hymenium is adnate
- Stipe has a cortina
- Spore print is brown
- Ecology is mycorrhizal
- Edibility is unknown

Austrocortinarius australiensis, commonly known as the skirt webcap, is a species of mushroom in the family Cortinariaceae which is native to Australia and New Zealand. The white mushrooms appear in autumn and can grow very large, with their caps reaching 30 cm (12 in) in diameter.

== Taxonomy ==
The species was originally described by John Burton Cleland and Edwin Cheel in 1918 as Rozites australiensis. Cleland later (1924) placed it in Locellina, a now-defunct genus that has since been folded into Cortinarius. Egon Horak transferred the species to Cortinarius in 1981, giving it the binomial by which it is now known.

Classified in Cortinarius subgenus Phlegmacium, this was the type species of series Australiensium as defined by Bruno Gasparini in 2006. This is a grouping of related Southern Hemisphere species characterized by an abundant universal veil, medium to large and pale fruitbodies, and ellipsoid to amygdaliform (almond-shaped) spores. It is commonly known as the skirt webcap.

In 2022 the species was transferred from Cortinarius to the novel genus Austrocortinarius based on genomic data. As of January 2023 the genus Austrocortinarius contains only the two species Austrocortinarius australiensis and Austrocortinarius victoriaensis.

== Description ==
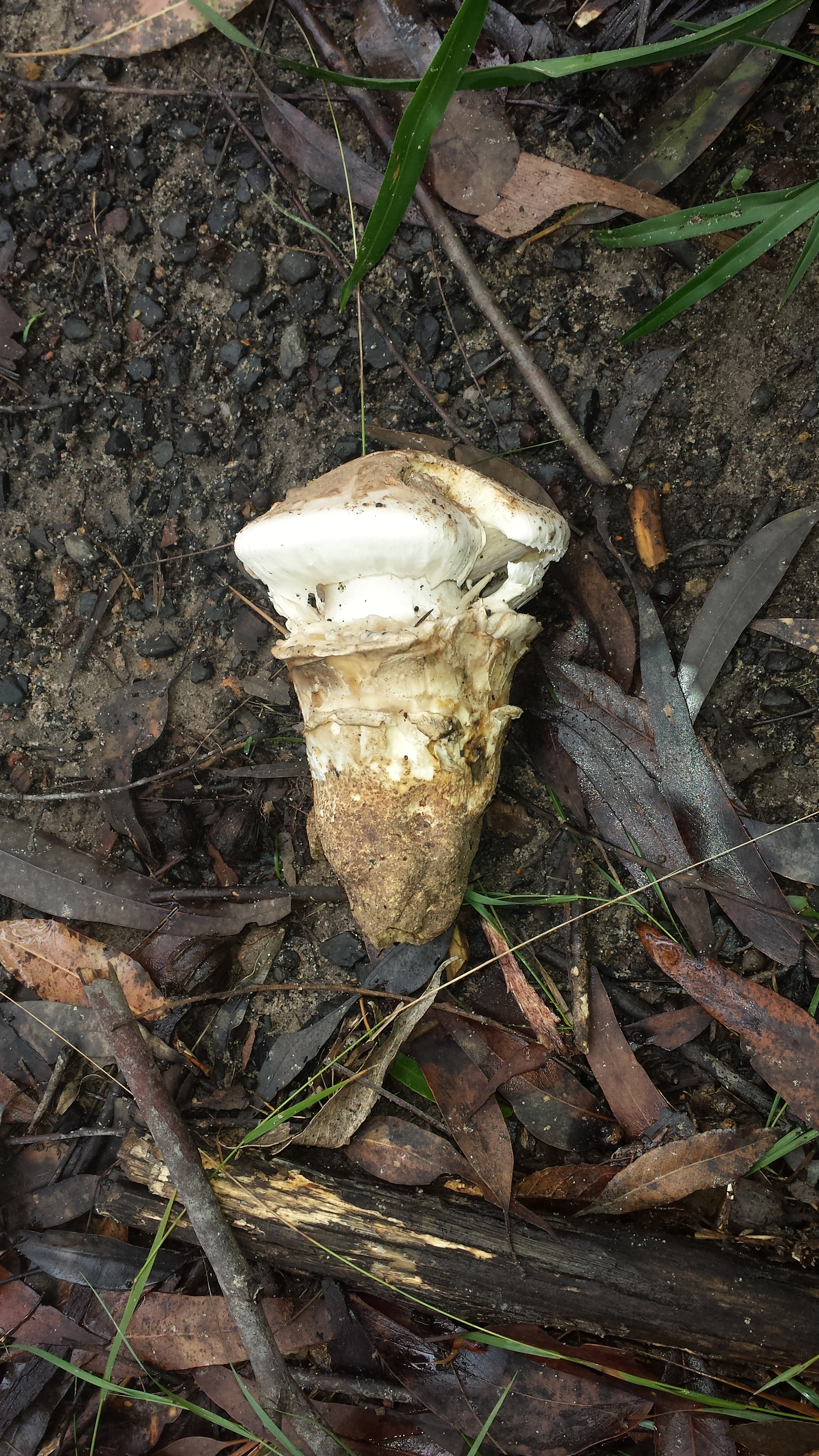
Immature mushroom covered in cortina

The fruitbodies of this fungus have convex to flattened caps with diameters typically in the range 5 to 7.5 cm (2.0 to 3.0 in), although specimens up to 30 cm (12 in) have been noted. There is no discernible odour. The cap colour is whitish with brown tints, and ragged fragments of the partial veil often remain attached to the cap margin. The stipe is bulbous, with dimensions of 15 cm (5.9 in) long and 3.7–6.2 cm (1.5–2.4 in), although it is often much smaller than this. The gills on the cap underside have an initially adnate attachment to the stipe and pale straw colour; later, the gill attachment becomes sinuate to nearly free, and colour deepens to rusty brown as the spores mature. The gills can be up to 1 cm (0.4 in) deep. Remnants of a ring often persist on the stipe until maturity, as well as bits of the universal veil that once enclosed the immature mushroom. The ring is often stained dark brown from the spores falling from the gills. The ellipsoid to almond-shaped spores measure 10–13 by 5.4–6.9 μm, and turn yellowish brown in KOH. Western Australian specimens have slightly larger spores, averaging 11.1 by 5.9 μm.

The edibility of this mushroom is unknown, and it should be avoided, as some of its close relatives contain lethal toxins. Young fruitbodies of A. australiensis can resemble those of Amanita ovoidea. A. australiensis can be mistaken for the similar-looking dumpy webcap (Cortinarius sublargus), though the latter species is generally smaller, lacks the prominent ring and generally only grows in recently burnt areas.

== Habitat and distribution ==
Austrocortinarius australiensis has been recorded from New South Wales, and Mount Lofty Ranges, Kuitpo and Ashton in South Australia. It has been recorded from the wet forests of Tasmania, but is rare there. The fungus is mycorrhizal with eucalypts. Large clumps of fruitbodies appear in eucalypt forests between April and July. A. australiensis has the largest mushrooms of any species native to Jarrah forests of southwestern Australia, and they are often eaten by native mammals. The mushroom also occurs in New Zealand, where it grows with Leptospermum.

== See also ==
- List of Cortinarius species
