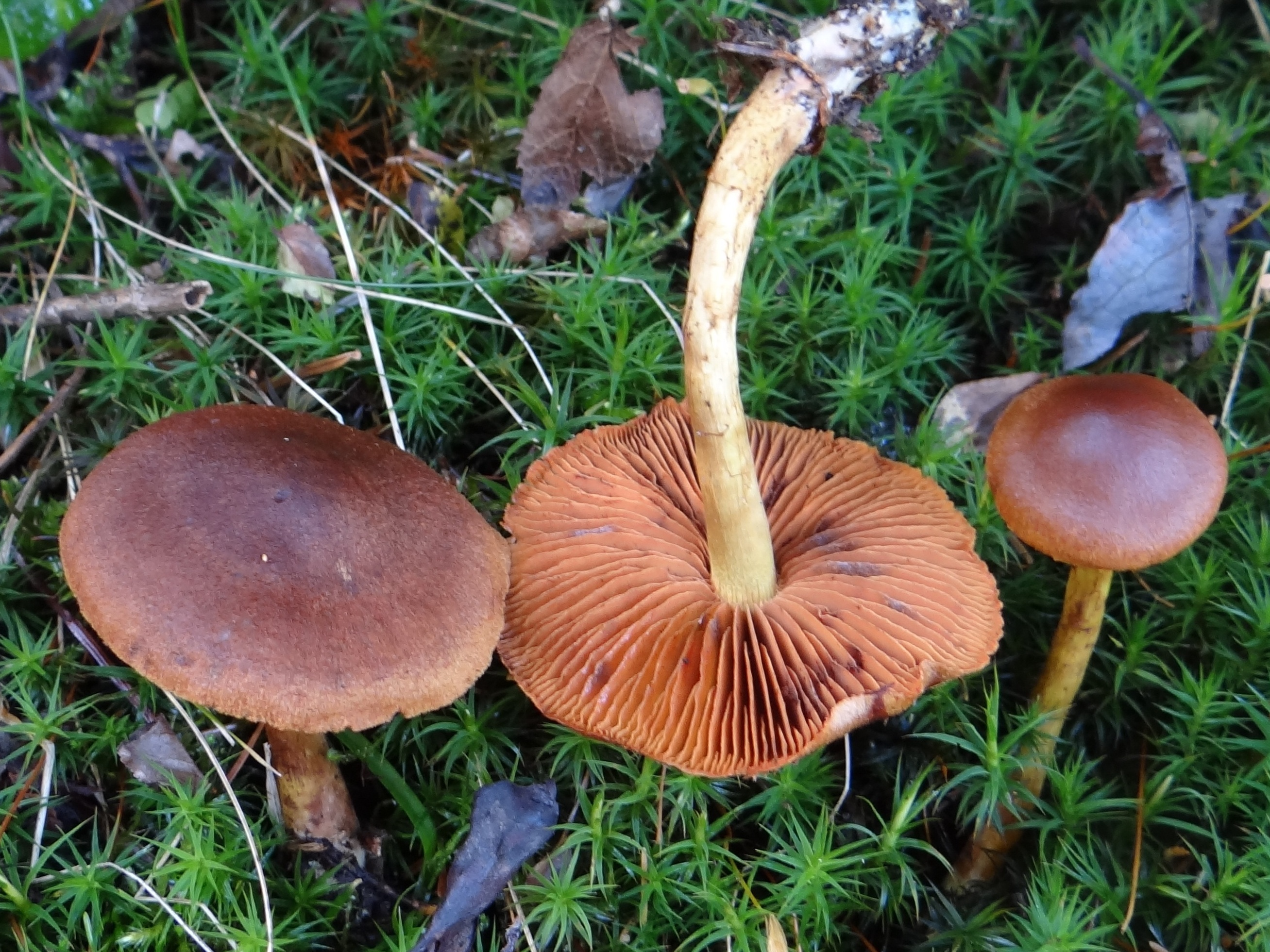

Scientific classification
- Kingdom: Fungi
- Division: Basidiomycota
- Class: Agaricomycetes
- Order: Agaricales
- Family: Cortinariaceae
- Genus: Cortinarius
- Species: C. uliginosus

Binomial name
- Cortinarius uliginosus Berk.

= Cortinarius uliginosus =

Species of fungus

Cortinarius uliginosus Mycological characteristics
- Gills on hymenium
- Cap is conical or umbonate
- Hymenium is adnate
- Stipe has a cortina
- Spore print is reddish-brown
- Ecology is mycorrhizal
- Edibility is unknown

Cortinarius uliginosus, commonly known as the orange willow webcap or marsh webcap, is a species of mushroom in the family Cortinariaceae. It was first described by Miles Joseph Berkeley in 1860.

== Description ==
The cap of Cortinarius ulginosus is orangish, and can be ochre or reddish. It is about 1.5-4.5 centimeters in diameter. It starts out conical or campanulate, and expands to convex, flat, or umbonate in age. The gills are adnate, and start out yellow, before becoming orangish or brownish. The stipe is about 2.5-7.5 centimeters long and 2-8 millimeters wide. It is yellowish. A cortina is present. The spore print is rusty brown.

== Habitat and ecology ==
Cortinarius uliginosus is found under willow trees in wet areas. It is also found in alder carr forests. It is found in both North America and Europe. It is mycorrhizal.
