= Cortinarius corpulentus =

Scientific classification
- Kingdom: Fungi
- Division: Basidiomycota
- Class: Agaricomycetes
- Order: Agaricales
- Family: Cortinariaceae
- Genus: Cortinarius
- Species: C. corpulentus

Binomial name
- Cortinarius corpulentus Bojantchev, S.D. Adams, Liimat. & Niskanen

Species of fungus

Cortinarius corpulentus
- Mycological characteristics
- Gills on hymenium
- Cap is convex or flat
- Hymenium is adnexed
- Stipe has a cortina
- Spore print is reddish-brown
- Ecology is mycorrhizal
- Edibility is unknown

Cortinarius corpulentus is a species of mushroom in the family Cortinariaceae.

== Description ==
The cap of Cortinarius corpulentus is purplish, often with an orangish spot at the center. It is slimy when wet and about 4–13 centimeters in diameter. The stipe is about 5–13 centimeters long and 1.5–7.5 centimeters wide. It starts out white and later becomes orangish. The gills start out bluish and become tan and eventually brown as the mushroom gets older. They are adnexed and often notched.

== Habitat and ecology ==
Cortinarius corpulentus grows under douglas fir trees in Western North America.
