= Cortinarius rufosanguineus =

Scientific classification
- Kingdom: Fungi
- Division: Basidiomycota
- Class: Agaricomycetes
- Order: Agaricales
- Family: Cortinariaceae
- Genus: Cortinarius
- Species: C. rufosanguineus

Binomial name
- Cortinarius rufosanguineus S.D. Adams, Ammirati & Liimat.

Species of fungus

Cortinarius rufosanguineus Mycological characteristics
- Gills on hymenium
- Cap is convex or flat
- Hymenium is adnate
- Stipe has a cortina
- Spore print is reddish-brown
- Ecology is mycorrhizal
- Edibility is unknown

Cortinarius rufosanguineus, commonly known as the bloodred webcap, is a species of mushroom in the family Cortinariaceae.

== Description ==
The cap of Cortinarius rufosanguineus starts out rounded, before expanding to convex or flat. It is about 2–6.5 centimeters in diameter. The gills can be adnate, sinuate, or sometimes decurrent. The stipe is about 2–6.5 centimeters long and 0.5-1.5 centimeters wide. It is sometimes slightly wider at the base. Virtually the entire mushroom is red. A cortina is present, and spore print is rusty brown.

== Habitat and ecology ==
Cortinarius rufosanguineus is rare, and found under fir and hemlock trees. It is found in meadows in subalpine regions, and can be found in Alaska and Washington.
