= Cortinarius anomalodelicatus =

Scientific classification
- Kingdom: Fungi
- Division: Basidiomycota
- Class: Agaricomycetes
- Order: Agaricales
- Family: Cortinariaceae
- Genus: Cortinarius
- Species: C. anomalodelicatus

Binomial name
- Cortinarius anomalodelicatus Ammirati, Liimat., Niskanen & Dima

Species of fungus

Cortinarius anomalodelicatus is a species of mushroom in the family Cortinariaceae.

== Description ==
The cap of Cortinarius anomalodelicatus is about 2-2.5 centimeters in diameter. It starts out a grayish purplish color, before becoming brown as the mushroom gets older. It is convex. The stipe is about 5.5-7.4 centimeters long, 4-6 millimeters wide, and grayish to brownish. The gills are grayish to brownish, and are adnexed to emarginate.

== Habitat and ecology ==
Cortinarius anomalodelicatus
- Mycological characteristics
- Gills on hymenium
- Cap is convex
- Hymenium is adnexed or emarginate
- Stipe has a cortina
- Ecology is mycorrhizal
- Edibility is unknown

Cortinarius anomalodelicatus is found in conifer forests, where it grows under spruce trees. It is found in Western North America.
