= Cortinarius elegans =

Scientific classification
- Domain: Eukaryota
- Kingdom: Fungi
- Division: Basidiomycota
- Class: Agaricomycetes
- Order: Agaricales
- Family: Cortinariaceae
- Genus: Cortinarius
- Species: C. elegans

Binomial name
- Cortinarius elegans Reumaux, 1989

Species of fungus

Cortinarius elegans is a species of mushrooms in the family Cortinariaceae.
