= Cortinarius catarracticus =

Scientific classification
- Domain: Eukaryota
- Kingdom: Fungi
- Division: Basidiomycota
- Class: Agaricomycetes
- Order: Agaricales
- Family: Cortinariaceae
- Genus: Cortinarius
- Species: C. catarracticus

Binomial name
- Cortinarius catarracticus Gasparini, 2004

Species of fungus

Cortinarius catarracticus is a species of potentially lethal fungus in the family Cortinariaceae native to South Australia.
