= Cortinarius anisochrous =

Scientific classification
- Domain: Eukaryota
- Kingdom: Fungi
- Division: Basidiomycota
- Class: Agaricomycetes
- Order: Agaricales
- Family: Cortinariaceae
- Genus: Cortinarius
- Species: C. anisochrous

Binomial name
- Cortinarius anisochrous Kytöv., Liimat., Niskanen & H.Lindstr. (2013)

Species of fungus

Cortinarius anisochrous is an agaric fungus in the family Cortinariaceae. Described as new to science in 2013, it is found in Europe.

== See also ==
- List of Cortinarius species
