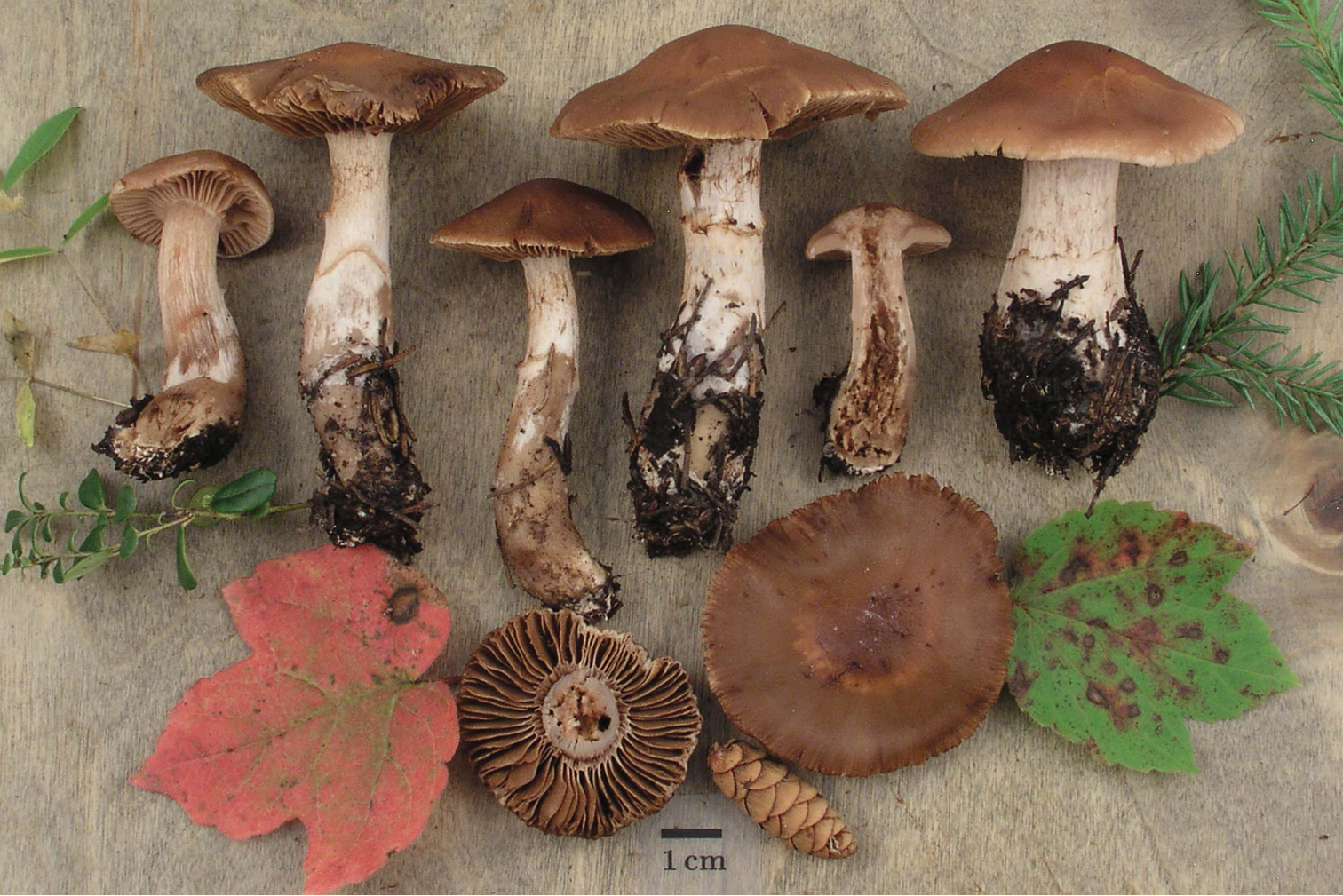

Scientific classification
- Domain: Eukaryota
- Kingdom: Fungi
- Division: Basidiomycota
- Class: Agaricomycetes
- Order: Agaricales
- Family: Cortinariaceae
- Genus: Cortinarius
- Species: C. bovarius

Binomial name
- Cortinarius bovarius Liimat. & Niskanen (2013)

= Cortinarius bovarius =

Species of fungus

Cortinarius bovarius is an agaric fungus in the family Cortinariaceae. Described as new to science in 2013, it is found in western North America. The specific epithet bovarius refers to the similarity to the European lookalike Cortinarius bovinus.

== Description ==
The fungus produces fruit bodies with reddish-brown caps measuring 3.5–7 cm (1.4–2.8 in) in diameter; it is initially spherical and later flattens out as the cap matures, sometimes developing a small umbo. The gills are moderately distantly spaced, with an adnexed to emarginate attachment to the stipe. The spores measure 8.5–10 by 5.5–6–6.5 μm. The basidia (spore-bearing cells) are four-spored, and measure 30–40 by 7.5–9.5 μm.

== Habitat and distribution ==
Cortinarius bovarius is found in western North America, including Alaska, and Alberta (Canada). It grows in coniferous forests dominated by spruce trees, and prefers rich, calcareous soils. Fruiting occurs from late August to September.

== See also ==
- List of Cortinarius species
