= Cortinarius albidipes =

Scientific classification
- Kingdom: Fungi
- Division: Basidiomycota
- Class: Agaricomycetes
- Order: Agaricales
- Family: Cortinariaceae
- Genus: Cortinarius
- Species: C. albidipes

Binomial name
- Cortinarius albidipes Peck

Species of fungus

Cortinarius albidipes, commonly known as the white-footed cortinarius, is a species of mushroom in the family Cortinariaceae.

== Description ==
The cap of Cortinarius albidipes is about 4-10 centimeters in diameter. It starts out grayish or buff, and becomes browner as the mushroom gets older. The stipe is about 4-10 centimeters long and 0.8-1.5 centimeters wide. It is pale to white in color. The gills start out purplish or grayish, later turning brown.

== Habitat and ecology ==
Cortinarius albidipes is found in mixed forests, and grows under hardwood trees. It often grows under willow.
