= Cortinarius seidliae =

Scientific classification
- Kingdom: Fungi
- Division: Basidiomycota
- Class: Agaricomycetes
- Order: Agaricales
- Family: Cortinariaceae
- Genus: Cortinarius
- Species: C. seidliae

Binomial name
- Cortinarius seidliae Ammirati, Niskanen & Liimat.

Species of fungus

Cortinarius seidliae
- Mycological characteristics
- Gills on hymenium
- Cap is conical or campanulate
- Hymenium is adnexed
- Stipe is bare
- Spore print is reddish-brown
- Ecology is mycorrhizal
- Edibility is unknown

Cortinarius seidliae is a species of mushroom in the family Cortinariaceae.

== Description ==
The cap of Cortinarius seidliae is slimy when wet and ranges in color from brown to beige. The stipe is about 5-14 centimeters long and 7-14 centimeters wide. It is purple to whitish in color. The partial veil is made of slime and disappears when the mushroom is older. The gills start out whitish and become brown in age. They are adnexed. The spore print is rusty brown.

== Habitat and ecology ==
Cortinarius seidliae is found in the Pacific Northwest, where it forms a mycorrhizal relationship with conifer trees.
