= Cortinarius morrisii =

Scientific classification
- Kingdom: Fungi
- Division: Basidiomycota
- Class: Agaricomycetes
- Order: Agaricales
- Family: Cortinariaceae
- Genus: Cortinarius
- Species: C. morrisii

Binomial name
- Cortinarius morrisii Peck, 1905

Species of fungus

Cortinarius morrisii is a species of fungus in the family Cortinariaceae native to North America. It was described by Peck in 1905.
