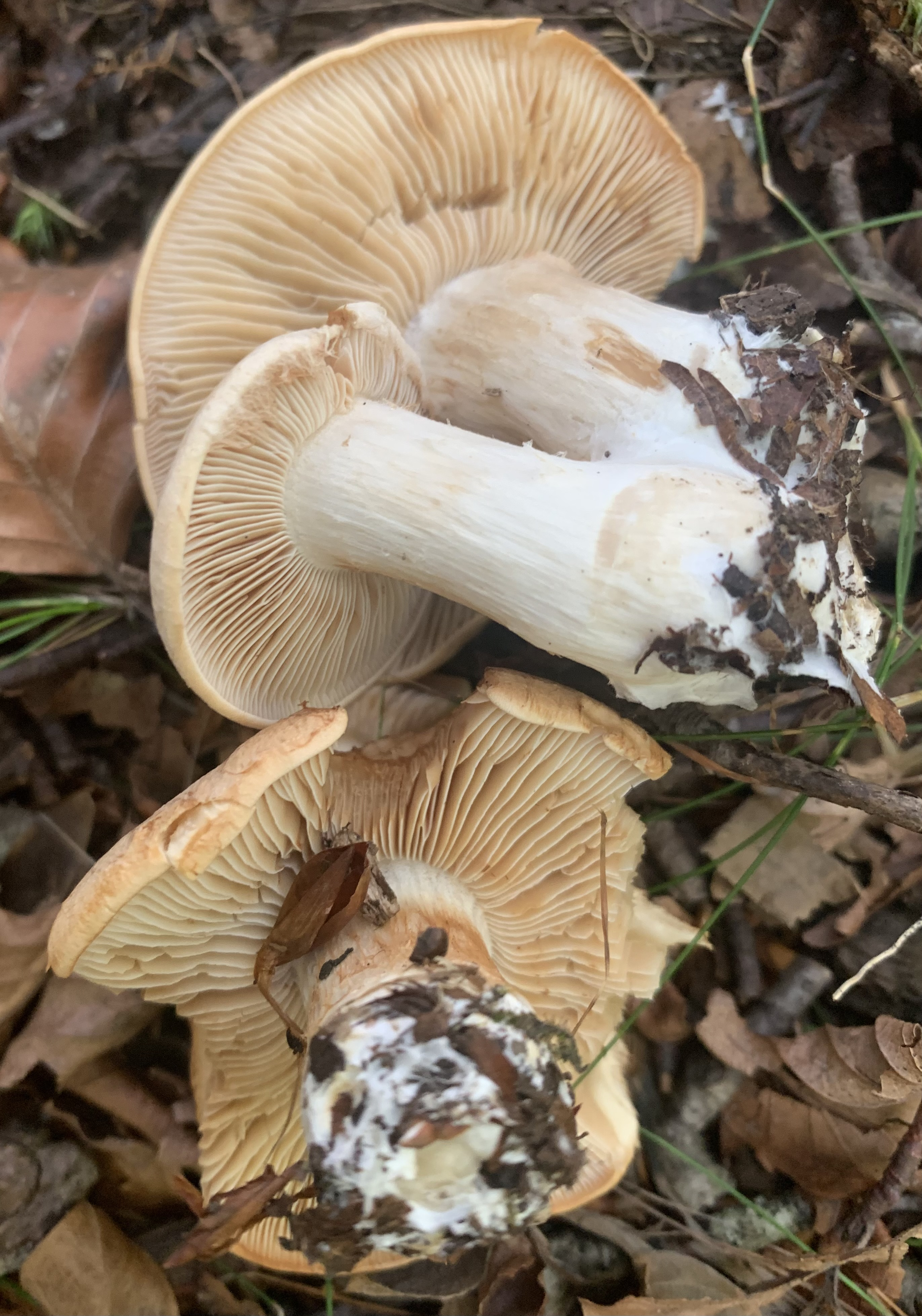
- Cystinarius crassus, formerly Cortinarius crassus

Scientific classification
- Domain: Eukaryota
- Kingdom: Fungi
- Division: Basidiomycota
- Class: Agaricomycetes
- Order: Agaricales
- Family: Cortinariaceae
- Genus: Cystinarius; Niskanen & Liimat. (2022)

Type species
- Cystinarius rubiginosus (Ammirati, Bojantchev, Niskanen & Liimat.) Liimat. & Niskanen (2022)

= Cystinarius =

Genus of fungi

Cystinarius is a genus of fungi in the family Cortinariaceae.

== Taxonomy ==
The genus was created in 2022 when the family Cortinariaceae, which previously contained only the one genus of Cortinarius was reclassified based on genomic data and split into the genera of Cortinarius, Aureonarius, Austrocortinarius, Calonarius, Cystinarius, Hygronarius, Mystinarius, Phlegmacium, Thaxterogaster and Volvanarius.

The genus is further divided with subgenus and section classifications:

- Cystinarius subgenus Cystinarius includes the section: Cystinarius.
- Cystinarius subgenus Crassi includes the section: Crassi.

== Etymology ==
The name Cystinarius derives from cystidia and Cortinarius. This is in reference to the cystidia found in this genus.

== Species ==
As of January 2023, Species Fungorum lists six accepted species of Cystinarius.

1. Cystinarius crassus (Fr.) Niskanen & Liimat. (2022)
2. Cystinarius eutactus (Soop) Niskanen & Liimat. (2022)
3. Cystinarius paurigarhwalensis (Semwal, Dima & Soop) Niskanen & Liimat. (2022)
4. Cystinarius rubicundulus (Rea) Niskanen & Liimat. (2022)
5. Cystinarius rubiginosus (Ammirati, Bojantchev, Niskanen & Liimat.) Liimat. & Niskanen (2022)
6. Cystinarius subgemmeus (Soop) Niskanen & Liimat. (2022)
