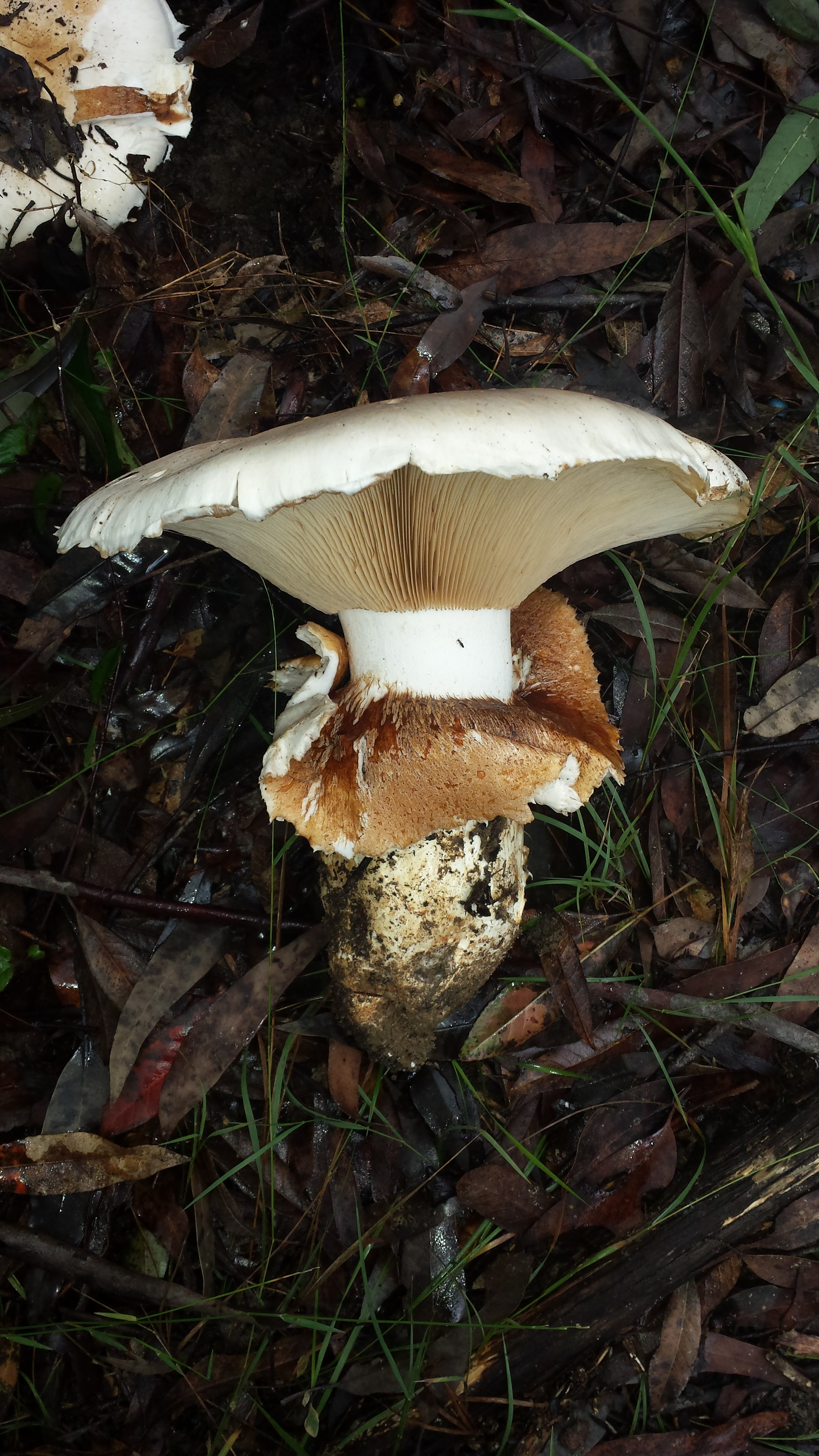
- Austrocortinarius australiensis

Scientific classification
- Kingdom: Fungi
- Division: Basidiomycota
- Class: Agaricomycetes
- Order: Agaricales
- Family: Cortinariaceae
- Genus: Austrocortinarius; Niskanen & Liimat. (2022)

Type species
- Austrocortinarius victoriaensis (Liimat.) Niskanen (2021)

= Austrocortinarius =

Genus of fungi

Austrocortinarius is a genus of fungi in the family Cortinariaceae.

== Taxonomy ==
The genus was created in 2022 when the family Cortinariaceae, which previously contained only the one genus of Cortinarius was reclassified based on genomic data and split into the genera of Cortinarius, Aureonarius, Austrocortinarius, Calonarius, Cystinarius, Hygronarius, Mystinarius, Phlegmacium, Thaxterogaster and Volvanarius. There is currently no infrageneric classification proposed.

== Etymology ==
The name Austrocortinarius derives from 'austro' meaning South and Cortinarius. Currently the genus is only known from the Southern Hemisphere and so it is named in reference to this.

== Species ==
As of January 2023, Species Fungorum accepted 2 species of Austrocortinarius.

1. Austrocortinarius australiensis (Cleland & Cheel) Liimat. & Niskanen (2022)
2. Austrocortinarius victoriaensis (Liimat.) Niskanen (2022)

== Morphology ==
Basidiocarps in the genus Austrocortinarius are characterized by their white color and distinct, peronate universal veils leaving annular remnants when mature. The basidiocarps may also possess a "rooting", subterranean stipe.

== Geographic Range ==
Currently, Austrocortinarius is only known from the Southern Hemisphere. The genus has been documented in the following countries: Australia and New Zealand.
