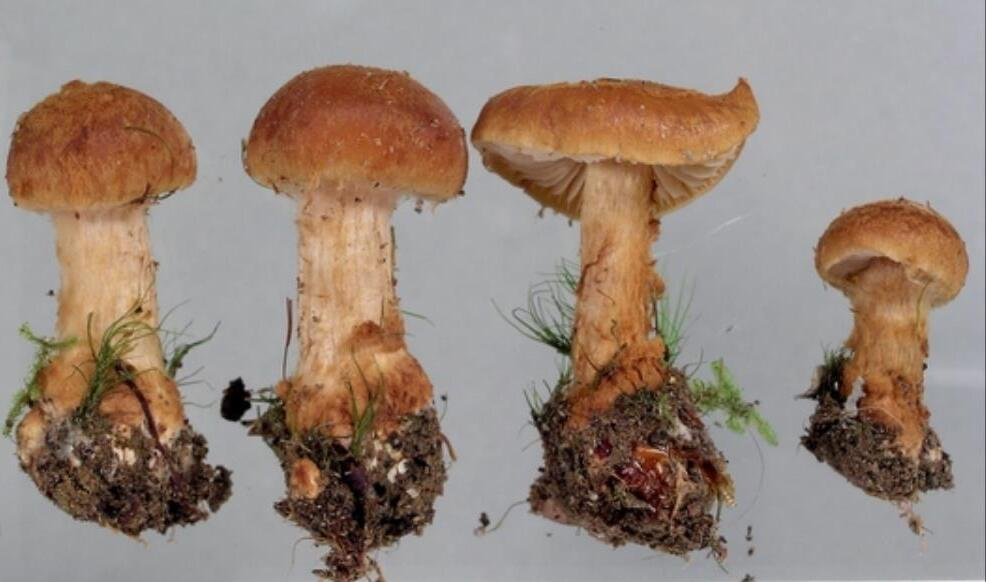
- Volvanarius thaumastus

Scientific classification
- Domain: Eukaryota
- Kingdom: Fungi
- Division: Basidiomycota
- Class: Agaricomycetes
- Order: Agaricales
- Family: Cortinariaceae
- Genus: Volvanarius; Niskanen & Liimat. (2022)

Type species
- Volvanarius chlorosplendidus (Furci, Niskanen, Beatriz San-Fabian, Liimat. & Salgado Salomón) Niskanen & Liimat. (2021)

= Volvanarius =

Genus of fungi

Volvanarius is a genus of fungi in the family Cortinariaceae.

== Taxonomy ==
The genus was created in 2022 when the family Cortinariaceae, which previously contained only the one genus of Cortinarius was reclassified based on genomic data and split into the genera of Cortinarius, Aureonarius, Austrocortinarius, Calonarius, Cystinarius, Hygronarius, Mystinarius, Phlegmacium, Thaxterogaster and Volvanarius.

The genus is further divided with subgenus classifications:

- Volvanarius subgenus Thaumasti.
- Volvanarius subgenus Volvanarius.

== Etymology ==
The name Volvanarius derives from the word volva and Cortinarius. This is in reference to the volva which many species in this genus present with.

== Species ==
As of January 2023, Species Fungorum accepted eight species of Volvanarius.

1. Volvanarius chlorophanus (M.M. Moser) Niskanen & Liimat. (2022)
2. Volvanarius chlorosplendidus (Furci, Niskanen, San-Fabian, Liimat. & Salgado Salomón) Niskanen & Liimat. (2022)
3. Volvanarius coleopus (M.M. Moser & E. Horak) Niskanen & Liimat. (2022)
4. Volvanarius cosmoxanthus (M.M. Moser) Niskanen & Liimat. (2022)
5. Volvanarius olivaceovaginatus (Niskanen, San-Fabian, Liimat. & E. Horak) Niskanen & Liimat. (2022)
6. Volvanarius subcosmoxanthus (Liimat., San-Fabian & Niskanen) Niskanen & Liimat. (2022)
7. Volvanarius thaumastus (Soop) Niskanen & Liimat. (2022)
8. Volvanarius vaginatus (E. Horak & M.M. Moser) Niskanen & Liimat. (2022)
