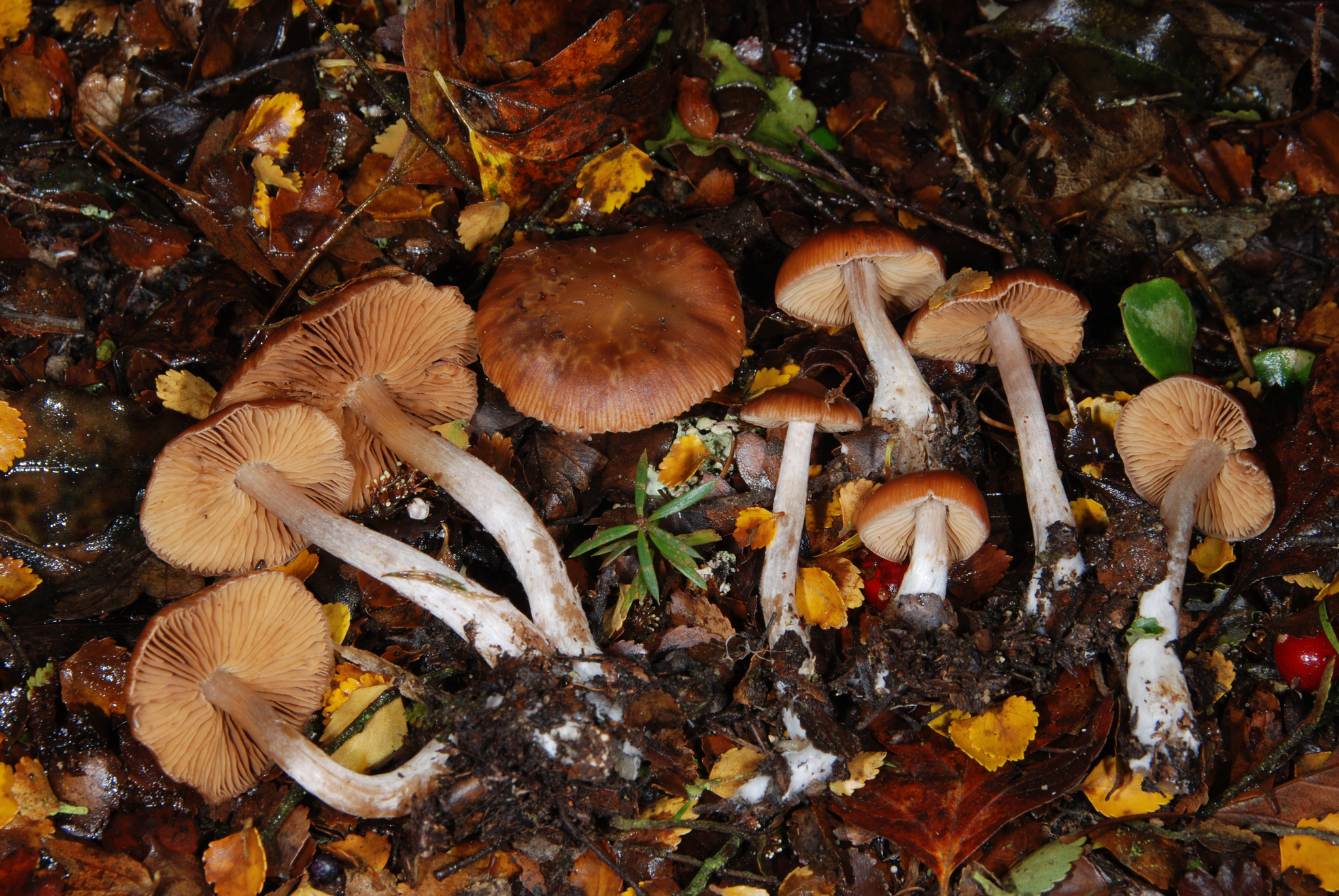
- Hygronarius viscincisus

Scientific classification
- Domain: Eukaryota
- Kingdom: Fungi
- Division: Basidiomycota
- Class: Agaricomycetes
- Order: Agaricales
- Family: Cortinariaceae
- Genus: Hygronarius; Niskanen & Liimat. (2022)

Type species
- Hygronarius renidens (Fr.) Niskanen & Liimat. (2021)

= Hygronarius =

Genus of fungi

Hygronarius is a genus of fungi in the family Cortinariaceae.

== Taxonomy ==
The genus was created in 2022 when the family Cortinariaceae, which previously contained only the one genus of Cortinarius was reclassified based on genomic data and split into the genera of Cortinarius, Aureonarius, Austrocortinarius, Calonarius, Cystinarius, Hygronarius, Mystinarius, Phlegmacium, Thaxterogaster and Volvanarius.

The genus is further divided with subgenus and section classifications:

- Hygronarius subgenus Hygronarius includes the section: Hygronarius.
- Hygronarius subgenus Viscincisi includes the sections: Austroduracini and Viscincisi.

== Etymology ==
The name Hygronarius derives from the word hygrophanous and Cortinarius. This is in reference to the hygrophanous caps of the species within this genera which display colour variations depending on moisture content.

== Species ==
As of January 2023, Species Fungorum accepted 5 species of Hygronarius.

1. Hygronarius austroduracinus (M.M. Moser) Liimat. & Niskanen (2022)
2. Hygronarius parahumilis (Garnica) Liimat. & Niskanen (2022)
3. Hygronarius renidens (Fr.) Niskanen & Liimat. (2022)
4. Hygronarius viridibasalis (M.M. Moser) Liimat. & Niskanen (2022)
5. Hygronarius viscincisus (Soop) Niskanen & Liimat. (2022)
