= Pyrrhoglossum =

Scientific classification
- Kingdom: Fungi
- Division: Basidiomycota
- Class: Agaricomycetes
- Order: Agaricales
- Family: Cortinariaceae
- Genus: Pyrrhoglossum; Singer (1944)

Type species
- Pyrrhoglossum pyrrhum (Berk. & M.A.Curtis) Singer (1944)

Genus of fungi

Pyrrhoglossum is a genus of fungus in the family Cortinariaceae. The genus is widely distributed, especially in tropical regions, and contains 11 species. It was circumscribed by American mycologist Rolf Singer in 1944.

== Species ==
- Pyrrhoglossum ferruginatum
- Pyrrhoglossum hepatizon
- Pyrrhoglossum holocrocinum
- Pyrrhoglossum lilaceipes
- Pyrrhoglossum macrosporum
- Pyrrhoglossum pyrrhum
- Pyrrhoglossum recedens
- Pyrrhoglossum stipitatum
- Pyrrhoglossum subpurpureum
- Pyrrhoglossum viriditinctum
- Pyrrhoglossum yunnanense
