= Mystinarius =

Scientific classification
- Domain: Eukaryota
- Kingdom: Fungi
- Division: Basidiomycota
- Class: Agaricomycetes
- Order: Agaricales
- Family: Cortinariaceae
- Genus: Mystinarius; Niskanen & Liimat. (2022)

Type species
- Mystinarius lustrabilis (Moënne-Locc) Niskanen & Liimat. (2021)

Genus of fungi

Mystinarius is a genus of fungi in the family Cortinariaceae.

== Taxonomy ==
The genus was created in 2022 when the family Cortinariaceae, which previously contained only the one genus of Cortinarius was reclassified based on genomic data and split into the genera of Cortinarius, Aureonarius, Austrocortinarius, Calonarius, Cystinarius, Hygronarius, Mystinarius, Phlegmacium, Thaxterogaster and Volvanarius.

The genus is further divided with subgenus and section classifications:

- Mystinarius subgenus Mystinarius.

== Etymology ==
The name Mystinarius derives from the Latin word 'mysticus' meaning mystical and Cortinarius.

== Species ==
As of January 2023, the genus is monotypic with only one species of Mystinarius accepted by Species Fungorum.

1. Mystinarius lustrabilis (Moënne-Locc.) Niskanen & Liimat. (2022)
