= Protoglossum =

Scientific classification
- Kingdom: Fungi
- Division: Basidiomycota
- Class: Agaricomycetes
- Order: Agaricales
- Family: Cortinariaceae
- Genus: Protoglossum; Massee (1891)

Type species
- Protoglossum luteum Massee (1891)

Synonyms
- Cortinomyces Bougher & Castellano (1993)

Genus of fungi

Protoglossum is a genus of fungus in the family Cortinariaceae. Protoglossum was circumscribed by George Edward Massee in 1891.

== Taxonomy ==
Protoglossum niveum is the only accepted species which remains in this genus with the previous 8 subsequently being reclassified as Cortinarius species as a result of papers in 2002 and 2014.
