= Quadrispora =

Scientific classification
- Kingdom: Fungi
- Division: Basidiomycota
- Class: Agaricomycetes
- Order: Agaricales
- Family: Cortinariaceae
- Genus: Quadrispora; Bougher & Castellano (1993)

Type species
- Quadrispora oblongispora (G.W.Beaton, Pegler & T.W.K.Young) Bougher & Castellano (1993)

Genus of fungi

Quadrispora is a genus of fungi in the family Cortinariaceae.

== Taxonomy ==
The genus contained three species found in Australia however in 2014 two of these were reclassified as Cortinarius species with Quadrispora oblongispora remaining as the only currently accepted species.
