= Partial veil =

Mushroom anatomy

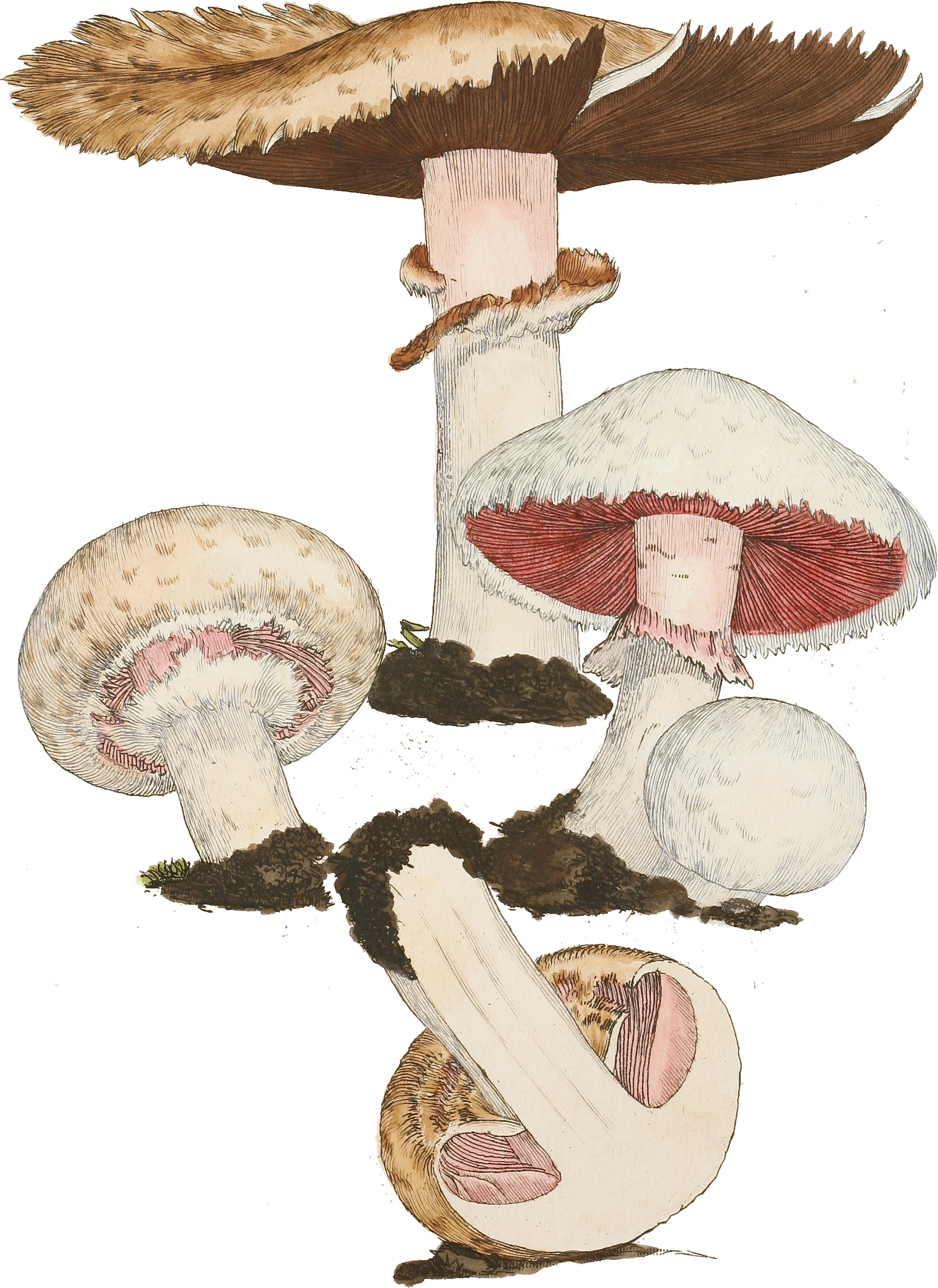
Developmental stages of Agaricus campestris showing the role and development of a partial veil

In mycology, a partial veil (also called an inner veil, to differentiate it from the "outer", or universal veil) is a temporary structure of tissue found on the fruiting bodies of some basidiomycete fungi, typically agarics. Its role is to isolate and protect the developing spore-producing surface, represented by gills or tubes, found on the lower surface of the cap. A partial veil, in contrast to a universal veil, extends from the stem surface to the cap edge. The partial veil later disintegrates, once the fruiting body has matured and the spores are ready for dispersal. It might then give rise to a stem ring, or fragments attached to the stem or cap edge. In some mushrooms, both a partial veil and a universal veil may be present.

== Structure ==
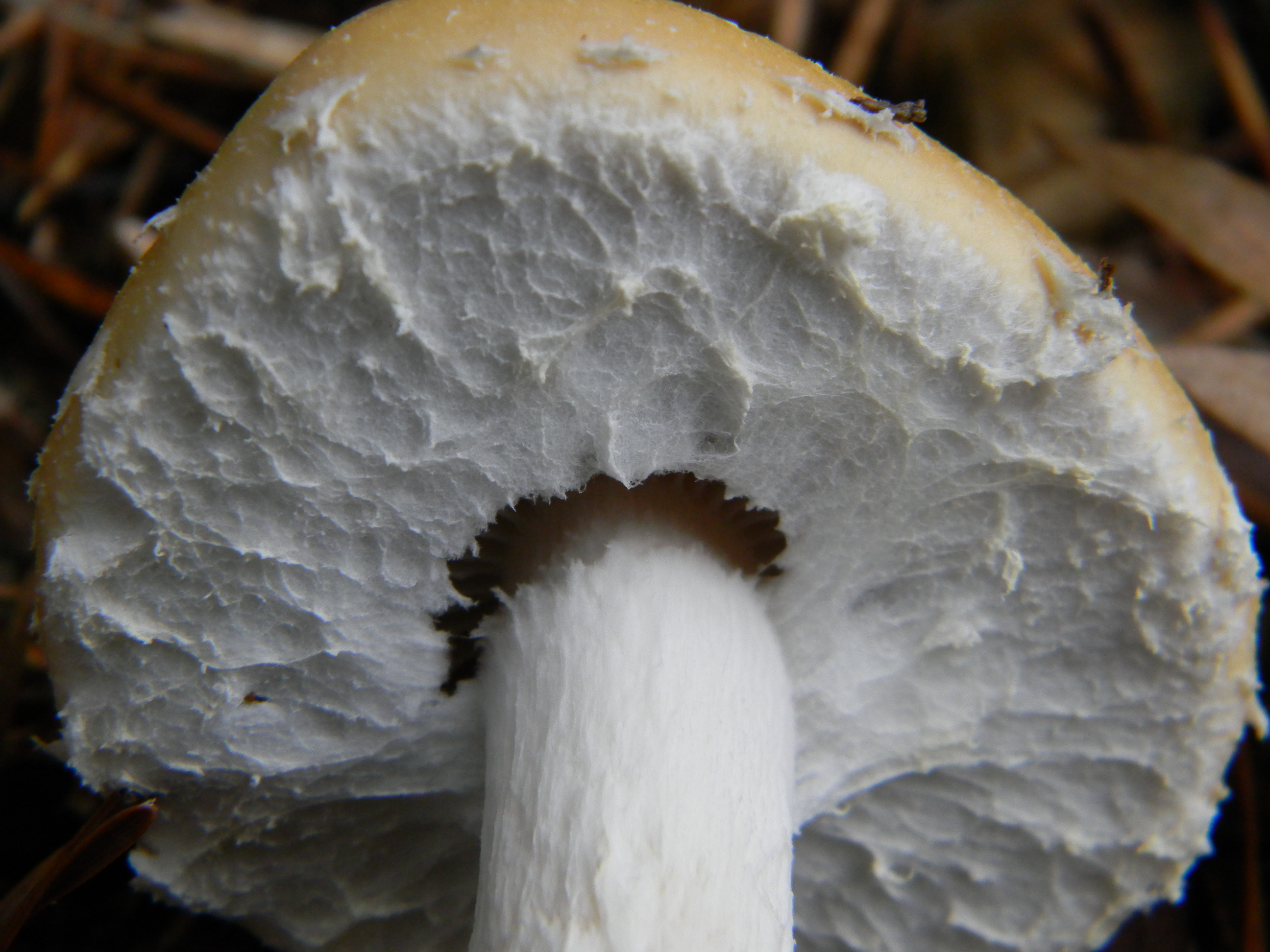
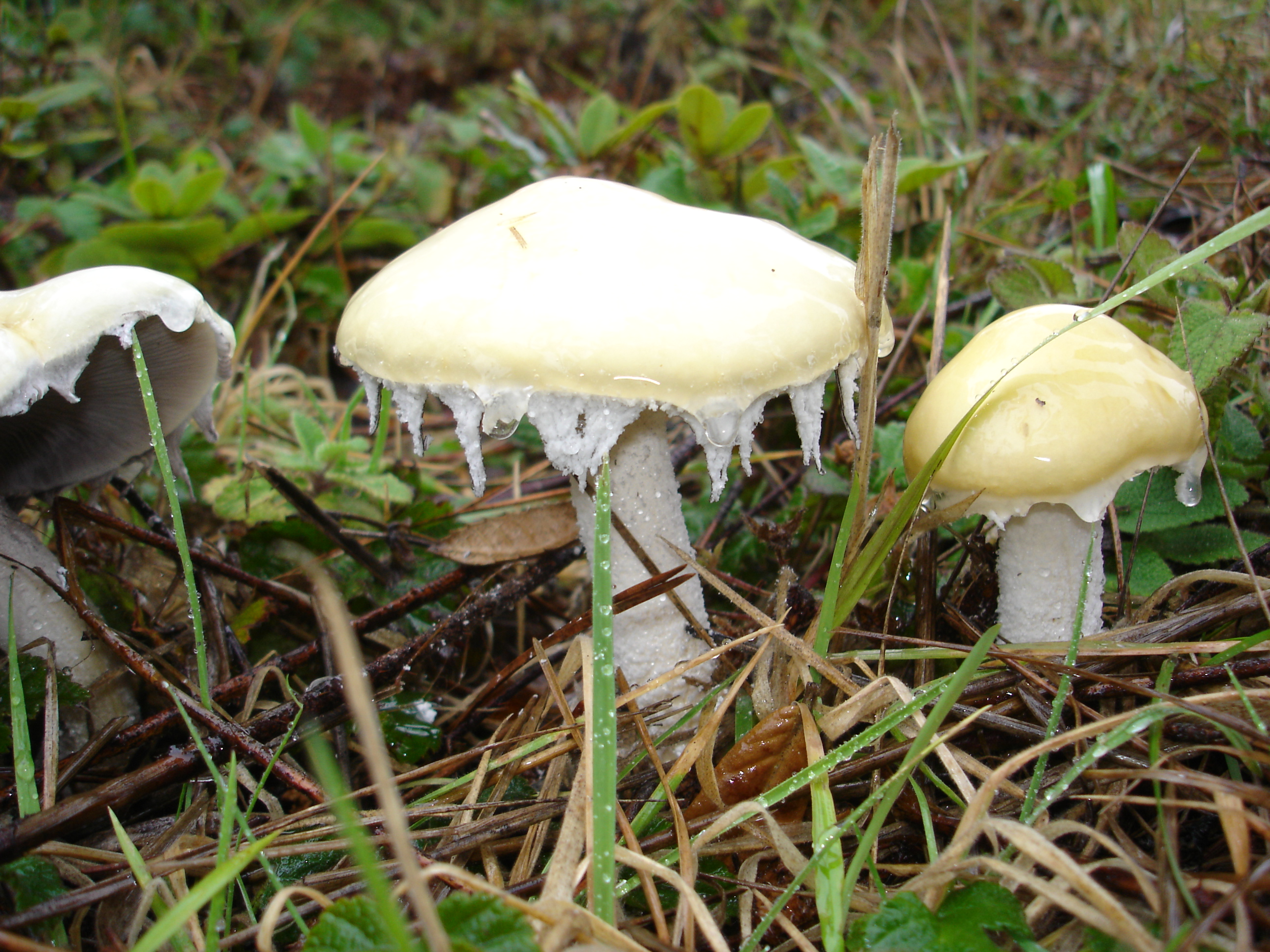
The partial veil of some species, like this Stropharia ambigua, may form an appendiculate cap margin

In the immature fruit bodies of some basidiomycete fungi, the partial veil extends from the stem surface to the cap margin and shields the gills during development, and later breaks to expose the mature gills. The presence, absence, or structure of the partial veil is an aid to identification of mushrooms. Some fruit bodies may have both a universal and partial veil, others may have only one or the other, while many lack both types of veils. The partial veil may be membranous or cobwebby, and may have multiple layers. Various adjectives are commonly used to describe the texture of partial veils, such as: membranous, like a membrane; cottony, where the veil tissue is made of separate fibers that may be easily separated like a cotton ball; fibrillose, composed of thin strands and glutinous, with a slimy consistency. Some mushrooms have partial veils which are evanescent, which are so thin and delicate that they disappear after they rupture, or leave merely a faint trace on the stem known as an annular zone or ring zone. Others may leave a persistent annulus (ring). Occasionally, the partial veil adheres to the edge of the cap as shreds of tissue, forming an appendiculate margin.

The cobweb-like, fragile partial veil of some mushrooms, especially those in the genus Cortinarius, are known as cortinas. The fibrous threads of the cortina often catch the brown spores as they drop, making them visible as fine brown streaks along the stem. Some species of Agaricus, such as Agaricus arvensis, have a partial veil that resembles a cogwheel. Mycologists Alexander H. Smith and Harry D. Thiers, in their 1964 monograph on the bolete genus Suillus, proposed the term "false veil" to account for those species of Suillus that have a "conspicuous cottony roll" of tissue that originates from the cap margin (especially in young specimens) and never becomes integrated with the stem tissue.

== Development in Agaricus ==
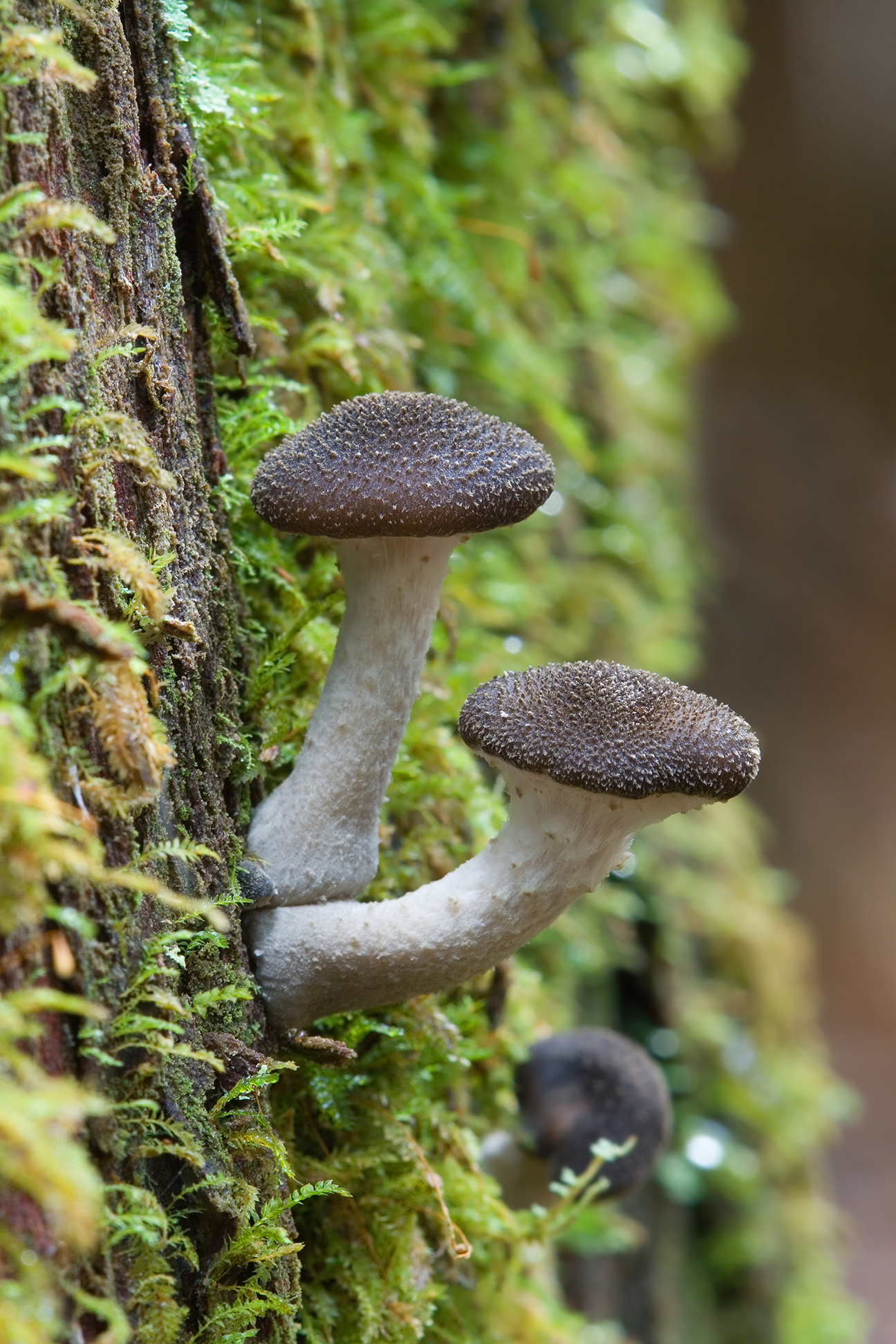
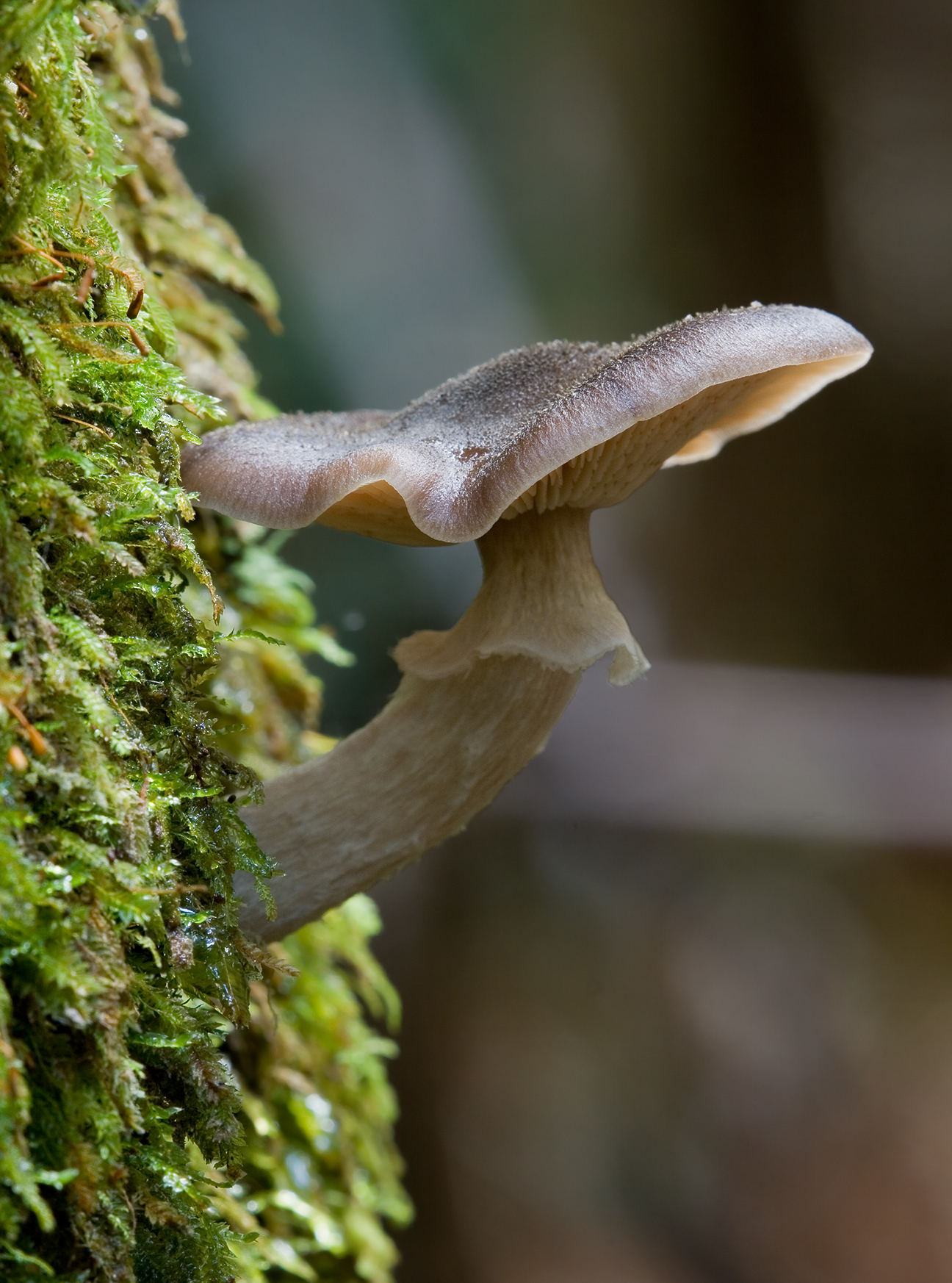
After the fruit body of Armillaria hinnulea expands, the partial veil remains as a ring on the stem.

Species in the genus Agaricus have a partial veil that is made of two layers of tissue, although the two layers are not clearly distinct in all species. In the early 20th century, American mycologist George Francis Atkinson investigated the development of the mushroom Agaricus arvensis by collecting young mushroom buttons (immature fruit bodies with the veil intact and the cap not yet expanded) and observing their growth in the laboratory. He determined that the partial veil originates from the tissue lying outside the annular cavity (the area containing the delicate developing hymenium and enclosed by the partial veil) and is not clearly separated from the universal veil. It is connected to both the margin of the cap and the surface of the stem. The partial veil increases in size as tension is applied to it from the expansion of the cap and stem. The lower portion of the partial veil (connected to the stem) has a looser texture, and is relatively porous to allow for air exchange. The upper portion of the partial veil (next to the gill cavity) is connected directly with the margin of the cap. It originates partly from fundamental tissue (actively dividing hyphae that comprise the bulk of the cap and stem tissue) and partly by growth from the margin of the cap. The looser portion of the veil is torn off from the surface of the stem as the mushroom expands and grows, and provides the looser lower portion of the duplex veil characteristic of this species and some of the other species of Agaricus, like A. augustus.

== Gallery ==
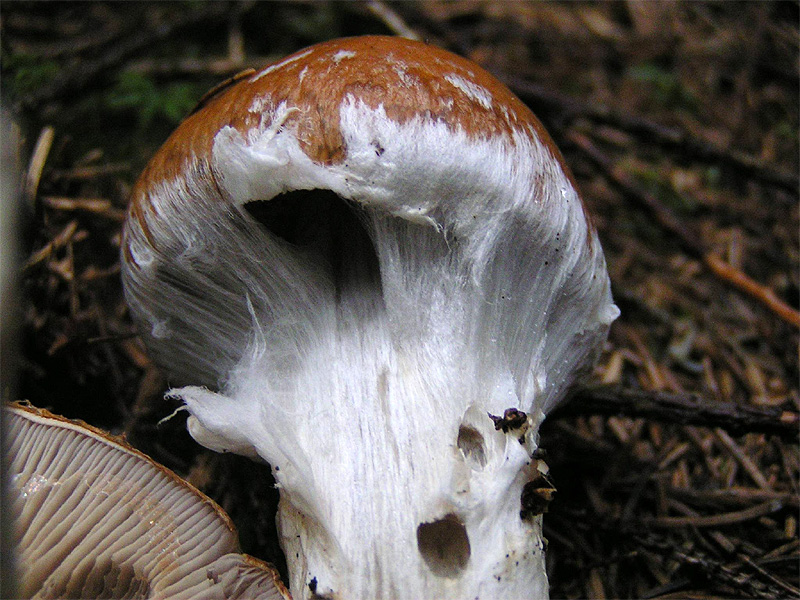
A cobweb-like cortina of Cortinarius claricolor

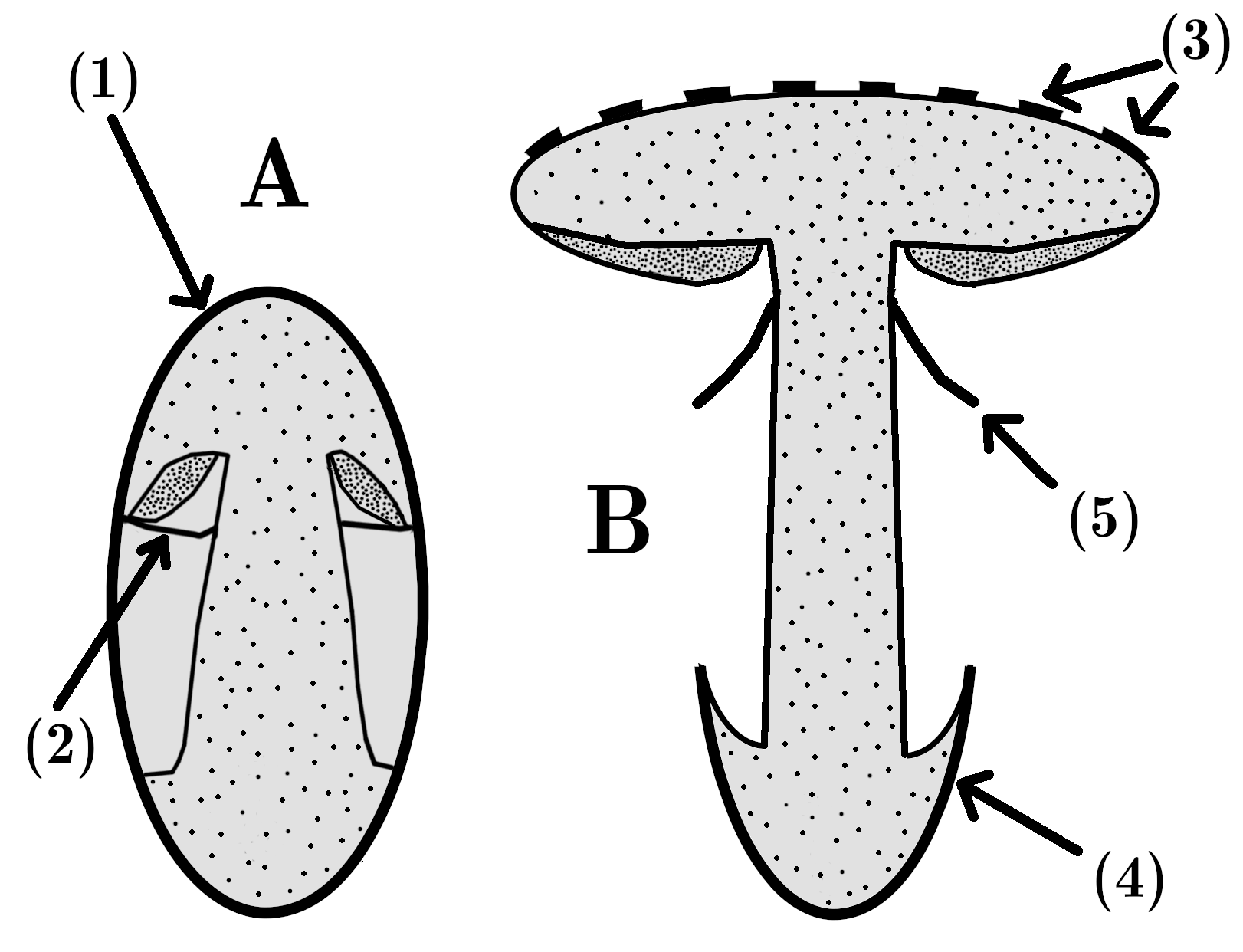
A simplified diagram of an agaric-type basidioma in (A) the early development stage, and (B) after the body is fully expanded. (1) is the universal veil, the outer layer protecting the developing basidioma; (2) is the partial veil, which covers the gills; (3) are cap scales, remnants of the universal veil; (4) is the volva, another remnant of the universal veil, but at the base of the basidioma; (5) is the annulus, a ring-like mark on the stipe that is a remnant of the partial veil, and whose overhanging tissue may become a cortina in some mushrooms.

== See also ==
- Universal veil
- Veil (mycology)
