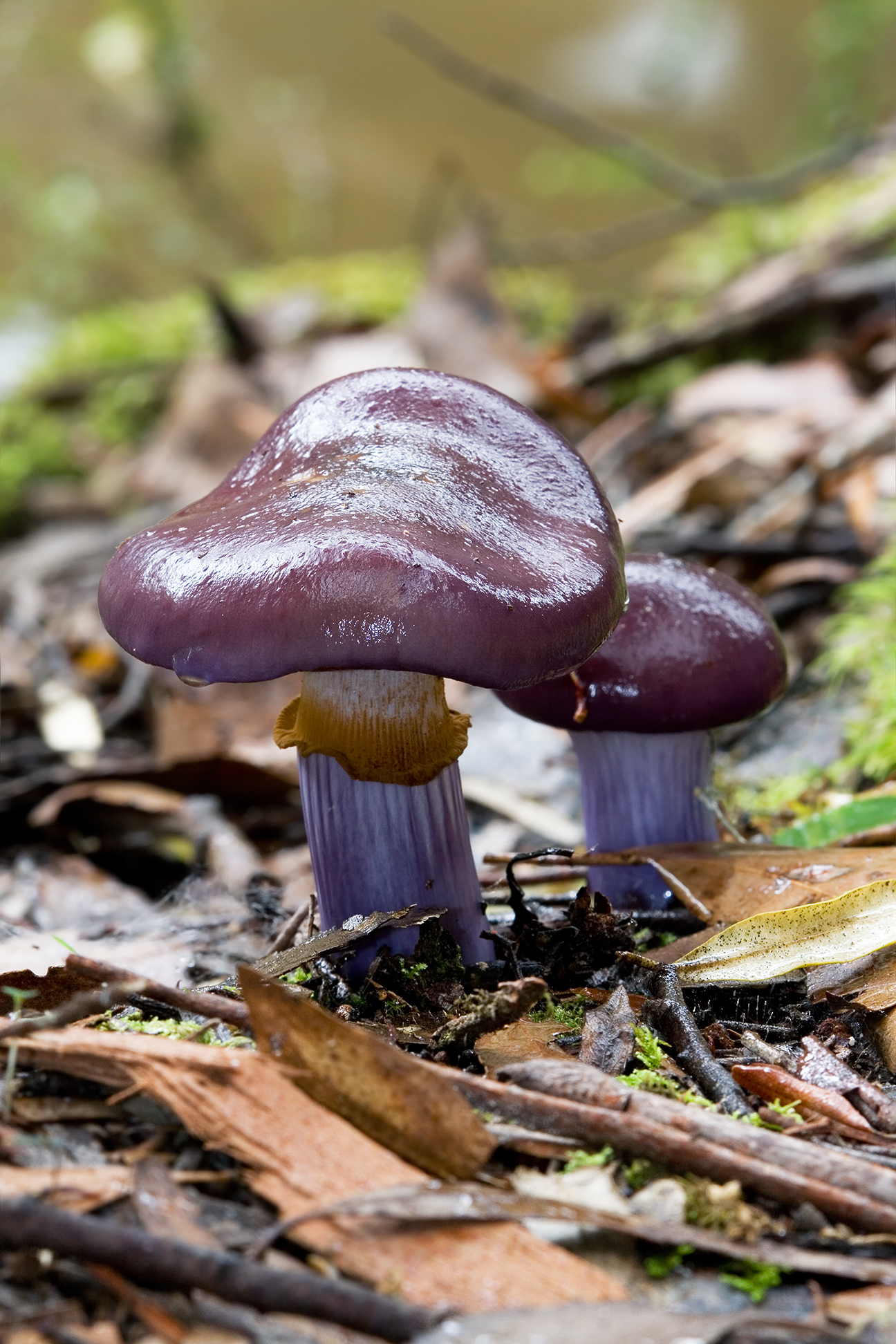
- Cortinarius archeri in Tasmania

Scientific classification
- Kingdom: Fungi
- Division: Basidiomycota
- Class: Agaricomycetes
- Order: Agaricales
- Family: Cortinariaceae; R.Heim ex Pouzar (1983)

Type genus
- Cortinarius Gray (1821)

Genera
- Aureonarius; Austrocortinarius; Calonarius; Cortinarius; Cystinarius; Hygronarius; Mystinarius; Phlegmacium; Protoglossum; Pyrrhoglossum; Quadrispora; Stephanopus; Thaxterogaster; Volvanarius

Synonyms
- Gigaspermaceae Jülich (1981); Gigaspermataceae Jülich (1981)

= Cortinariaceae =

Family of mushrooms

The Cortinariaceae are a large family of gilled mushrooms found worldwide, containing over 3200 species. The family takes its name from its largest genus, the varied species of the genus Cortinarius. Many genera formerly in the Cortinariaceae have been placed in various other families, including Hymenogastraceae, Inocybaceae and Bolbitiaceae.

The deadly toxin orellanine has been found in at least 34 Cortinariaceae.

== Taxonomy ==
Cortinariaceae is a family of mushrooms within the Order Agaricales. The spore producing hymenium is located on the gills. The pileipellis is a cutis. The spores are brown in deposit and, in most genera in this family, the spores are ornamented.

In 2022 the family Cortinariaceae, which previously contained only the one genus of Cortinarius was reclassified based on genomic data and split into the genera of Cortinarius, Aureonarius, Austrocortinarius, Calonarius, Cystinarius, Hygronarius, Mystinarius, Phlegmacium, Thaxterogaster and Volvanarius. Numerous Cortinarius species were transferred into these genera as a result of this work and many new species were described.

== Differences in genera ==
The species of the bihemispheric genus Aureonarius are characterised by vivid yellow, orange, or red colours, at least in some parts of the basidiomata.

Austrocortinarius is a small, Southern Hemispheric genus currently only known from Australia and New Zealand. The representatives of the genus are easy to recognize by the combination of pileipellis simplex, large, white basidiomata and a peronate universal veil often forming a distinct ring at the upper part of the rooting stipe.

The species-rich genus Calonarius is currently only known from the Northern Hemisphere. Typical for the members of this genus are medium- to large-sized, pileocarpic, often brightly coloured basidiomata with a more or less, usually distinctly marginated bulb at the base of the stipe. The species are most reminiscent of those in the genera Phlegmacium and Thaxterogaster, but the combination of simplex pileipellis, marginated bulb and amygdaloid to citriform, coarsely verrucose basidiospores distinguish the members of Calonarius from the other phlegmacioid species.

Cortinarius, the largest genus in Cortinariaceae, contains basidiocarps with warted spores, which are rusty-brown in deposit. Mushrooms in this genus have a partial veil which is a cortina. These mushrooms are terrestrial and mycorrhizal, and can range from small to large and fleshy.

This small bihemispheric genus Cystinarius is easy to recognize by the unique combination of small basidiospores (6–9 × 3.5–5 μm) and presence of cheilo- and pleurocystidia.

Hygronarius é a small bihemispheric genus includes small- to medium-sized, stipitocarpic, agaricoid species with yellow–brown to red-brown colours. The stipe is dry and the pileus is dry or viscid and hygrophanous. The pileipellis is duplex with a more or less developed hypoderm.

The species of the small, bihemispheric genus Mystinarius have medium-sized, stipitocarpic, agaricoid basidiomata with a yellow to reddish brown, somewhat viscid to almost dry pileus and a white to yellow, dry stipe. The pileipellis is duplex.

Most species of the Phlegmacium genus have a pileipellis duplex with a more or less developed hypoderm. Some species of the genus Cystinarius may also be confused with the species of the genus Phlegmacium, but Cystinarius species have distinct cheilo- and pleurocystidia and a dry pileus.

The size of the basidiomata of the species in Thaxterogaster genus ranges from small to large and vary in coloration from white, ochraceous, greenish, brown to purple. Several lineages of this genus have a honey-like or sweet smell in the context, not typical in other genera of the family Cortinariaceae.

The small genus Volvanarius is only known from the Southern Hemispheric Nothofagaceae forests. Members of this group can easily be identified in the field by the small and Phlegmacium-like basidiomata with a bulbous stipe, and the universal veil that in most species forms a distinct volva at the base of the stipe.

== Edibility ==
Despite the vast number of species in Cortinariaceae, this group is not widely eaten, and is generally avoided. There are many toxic species in this group and few are highly prized.

Cortinarius is one of the largest mushroom families, but due to the large amount of inedible and toxic species, most authors recommend not eating any Cortinarius. At one point, the Polish ate the fool's webcap, Cortinarius orellanus, until people began to get poisoned from eating the mushroom. It is now known that several Cortinarius species contain a deadly toxin, orellanine, which causes kidney failure. Most Cortinarius are regarded as either too small or unpleasant-tasting to eat, but some, such as the gypsy mushroom (Cortinarius caperatus) and the large Cortinarius praestans, are highly esteemed. However, some mycologists believe that no Cortinarius should be eaten.

== See also ==
- List of Agaricales families
