= List of Coprinopsis species =

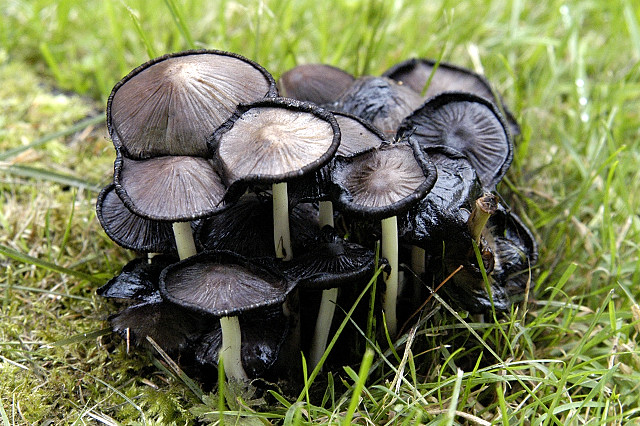
Coprinopsis atramentaria from Commanster, Belgium

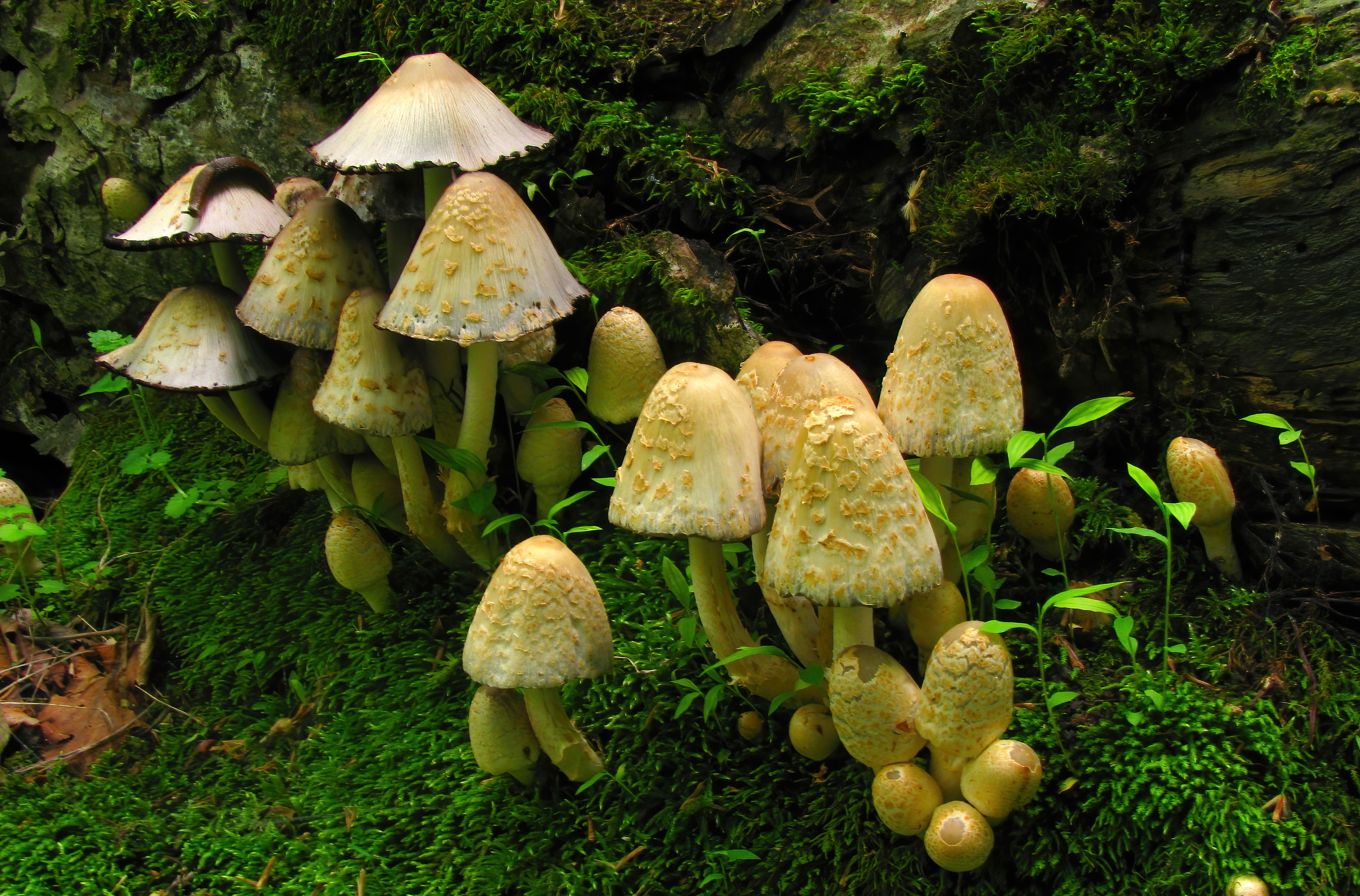
Coprinopsis variegata photographed in North Bend State Park, West Virginia

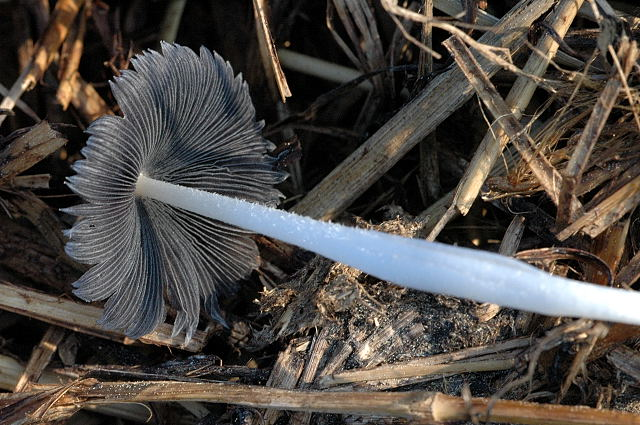
Coprinopsis cinerea from Commanster, Belgium

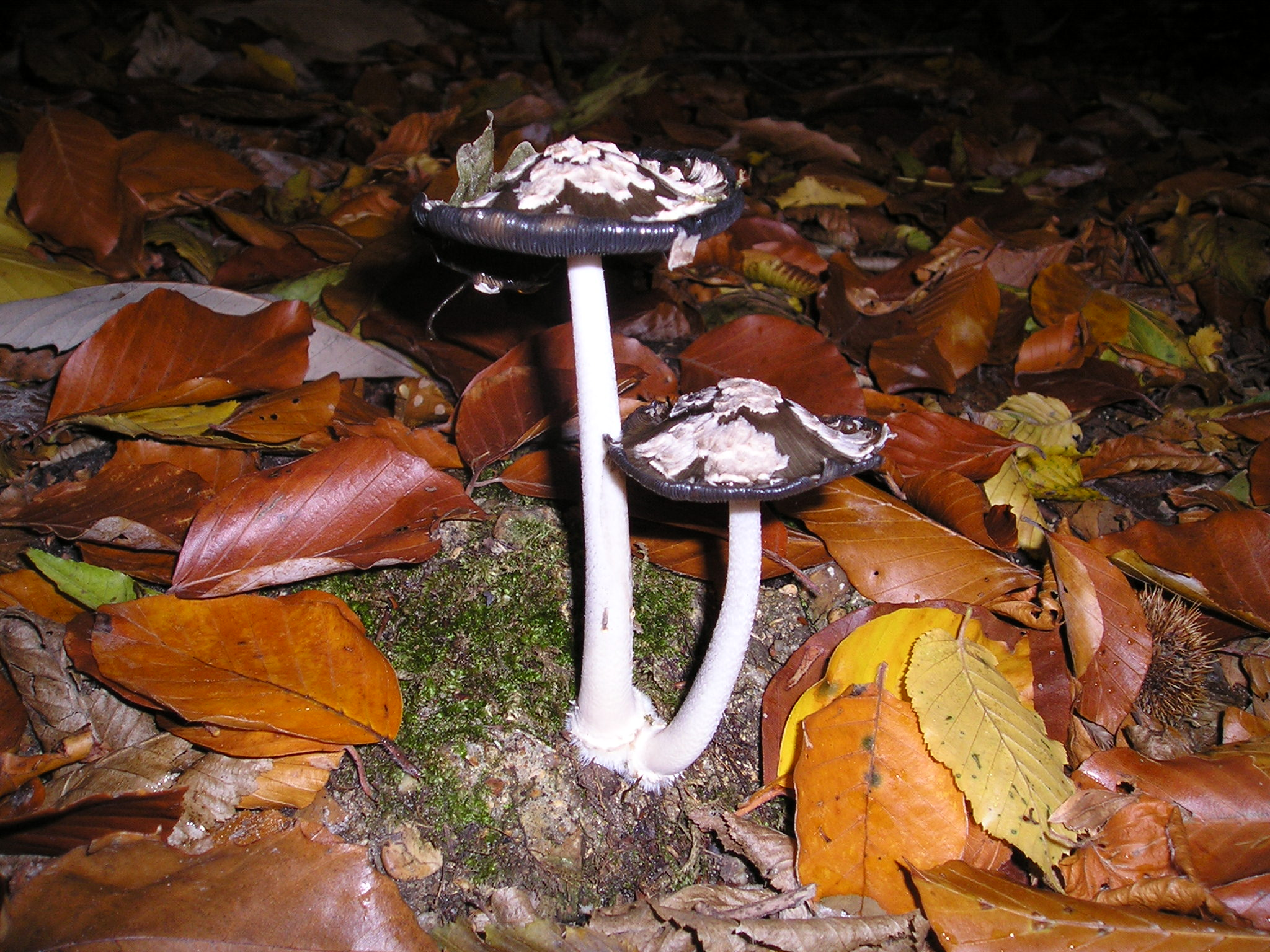
Coprinopsis picacea in a French wood

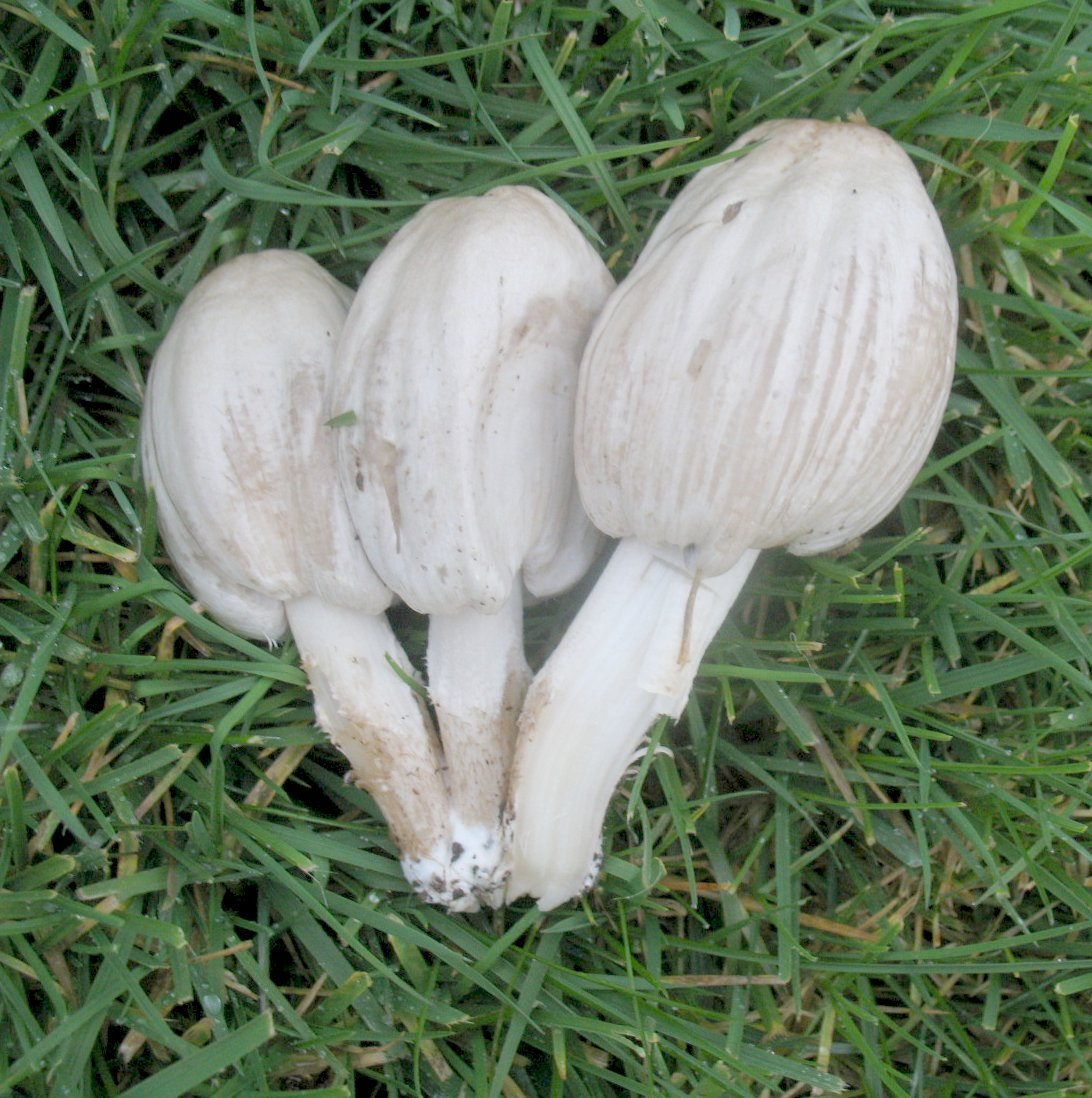
Coprinopsis atramentaria located in Santa Clara Co., California, USA

The following is a list of the species of the genus Coprinopsis in the family Psathyrellaceae. Coprinopsis was split out of the genus Coprinus based on molecular data. The species Coprinopsis cinerea is a model organism for mushroom-forming basidiomycota, and its genome has been sequenced completely.

== Species ==
1. Coprinopsis acuminata (Romagn.) Redhead, Vilgalys & Moncalvo (2001)
2. Coprinopsis aesontiensis A. Melzer, Ferisin & Dovana (2017)
3. Coprinopsis africana (Pegler) Redhead, Vilgalys & Moncalvo (2001)
4. Coprinopsis afrocinerea Mešić, Tkalčec, Čerkez, I. Kušan & Matočec (2018)
5. Coprinopsis afronivea Desjardin & B.A. Perry (2016)
6. Coprinopsis albiflavida Voto (2021)
7. Coprinopsis alcobae (A. Ortega) Valade (2014)
8. Coprinopsis alnivora (Bogart) Voto (2019)
9. Coprinopsis alopecia (Lasch) La Chiusa & Boffelli (2017)
10. Coprinopsis alutaceivelata (Bogart) Redhead, Vilgalys & Moncalvo (2001)
11. Coprinopsis ammophilae (Courtec.) Redhead, Vilgalys & Moncalvo (2001)
12. Coprinopsis annulopora (Enderle) P. Specht & H. Schub. (2013)
13. Coprinopsis arachnoidea P. Voto (2019)
14. Coprinopsis argentea (P.D. Orton) Redhead, Vilgalys & Moncalvo (2001)
15. Coprinopsis asiaticiphlyctidospora Fukiharu & Horigome (2013)
16. Coprinopsis atramentaria (Bull.) Redhead, Vilgalys & Moncalvo (2001)
17. Coprinopsis austrofriesii (Redhead & Pegler) Redhead, Vilgalys & Moncalvo (2001)
18. Coprinopsis austrophlyctidospora Fukiharu (2011)
19. Coprinopsis babosiae L. Nagy, Vágvölgyi & Papp (2013)
20. Coprinopsis bellula (Uljé) P. Roux & Eyssart. (2011)
21. Coprinopsis bicornis (Uljé & Horvers) Redhead, Vilgalys & Moncalvo (2001)
22. Coprinopsis bogartii Voto (2021)
23. Coprinopsis brunneistragulata (Bogart) Redhead, Vilgalys & Moncalvo (2001)
24. Coprinopsis brunneofibrillosa (Dennis) Redhead, Vilgalys & Moncalvo (2001)
25. Coprinopsis bubalina (Bogart) Redhead, Vilgalys & Moncalvo (2001)
26. Coprinopsis burkii (A.H. Sm.) Redhead, Vilgalys & Moncalvo (2001)
27. Coprinopsis calospora (Bas & Uljé) Redhead, Vilgalys & Moncalvo (2001)
28. Coprinopsis candidata (Uljé) Gminder & Böhning (2016)
29. Coprinopsis candidolanata (Doveri & Uljé) Keirle, Hemmes & Desjardin (2004)
30. Coprinopsis canoceps (Kauffman) Örstadius & E. Larss. (2015)
31. Coprinopsis caracasensis (Dennis) Voto (2020)
32. Coprinopsis caribaea (Pegler) Redhead, Vilgalys & Moncalvo (2001)
33. Coprinopsis cerkezii Tkalčec, Mešić, I. Kušan & Matočec (2017)
34. Coprinopsis cinchonensis (Murrill) Redhead, Vilgalys & Moncalvo (2001)
35. Coprinopsis cineraria (Har. Takah.) Örstadius & E. Larss. (2015)
36. Coprinopsis cinerea (Schaeff.) Redhead, Vilgalys & Moncalvo (2001)
37. Coprinopsis cinereofloccosa (P.D. Orton) Redhead, Vilgalys & Moncalvo (2001)
38. Coprinopsis clastophylla (Maniotis) Redhead, Vilgalys & Moncalvo (2001)
39. Coprinopsis coniophora (Romagn.) Redhead, Vilgalys & Moncalvo (2001)
40. Coprinopsis cortinata (J.E. Lange) Gminder (2010)
41. Coprinopsis cothurnata (Godey) Redhead, Vilgalys & Moncalvo (2001)
42. Coprinopsis cubensis (Berk. & M.A. Curtis) Redhead, Vilgalys & Moncalvo (2001)
43. Coprinopsis dendrocystota Voto (2021)
44. Coprinopsis depressiceps (Bogart) Redhead, Vilgalys & Moncalvo (2001)
45. Coprinopsis discipes (Pat.) Voto (2020)
46. Coprinopsis dolichocystidiata Voto (2021)
47. Coprinopsis dryophila (Pat.) Voto (2019)
48. Coprinopsis echinospora (Buller) Redhead, Vilgalys & Moncalvo (2001)
49. Coprinopsis ephemeroides (DC.) G. Moreno (2010)
50. Coprinopsis epichloea (Uljé & Noordel.) Redhead, Vilgalys & Moncalvo (2001)
51. Coprinopsis episcopalis (P.D. Orton) Redhead, Vilgalys & Moncalvo (2001)
52. Coprinopsis erythrocephala (Lév.) Redhead, Vilgalys & Moncalvo (2001)
53. Coprinopsis extinctoria (Fr.) Redhead, Vilgalys & Moncalvo (2001)
54. Coprinopsis fagnani (Raithelh.) Voto (2020)
55. Coprinopsis fibrillosa (Berk. & Broome) Redhead, Vilgalys & Moncalvo (2001)
56. Coprinopsis filamentifera (Kühner) Redhead, Vilgalys & Moncalvo (2001)
57. Coprinopsis filamentiferoides Voto (2021)
58. Coprinopsis filiformis (Berk. & Broome) Voto (2019)
59. Coprinopsis fluvialis (Lancon. & Uljé) Redhead, Vilgalys & Moncalvo (2001)
60. Coprinopsis foetidella (P.D. Orton) Atri, A. Kaur & M. Kaur (2014)
61. Coprinopsis foetidella (P.D. Orton) A. Ruiz & G. Muñoz (2016)
62. Coprinopsis friesii (Quél.) P. Karst. (1881)
63. Coprinopsis fusispora L. Nagy, Vágvölgyi & Papp (2013)
64. Coprinopsis geesterani (Uljé) Redhead, Vilgalys & Moncalvo (2001)
65. Coprinopsis gelatinosa (D.A. Reid & Eicker) Voto (2020)
66. Coprinopsis ghanensis P. Voto (2019)
67. Coprinopsis gonophylla (Quél.) Redhead, Vilgalys & Moncalvo (2001)
68. Coprinopsis goudensis (Uljé) Redhead, Vilgalys & Moncalvo (2001)
69. Coprinopsis hawaiana P. Voto (2019)
70. Coprinopsis herbivora (Singer) Redhead, Vilgalys & Moncalvo (2001)
71. Coprinopsis herinkii (Pilát & Svrček) Redhead, Vilgalys & Moncalvo (2001)
72. Coprinopsis heterocoma (Malençon) Redhead, Vilgalys & Moncalvo (2001)
73. Coprinopsis hypsizyga (Singer) Voto (2020)
74. Coprinopsis idae (Uljé) La Chiusa & Boffelli (2017)
75. Coprinopsis igarashii Fukiharu & Kim. Shimizu (2015)
76. Coprinopsis indicifoetidella P. Voto (2019)
77. Coprinopsis insignis (Peck) Redhead, Vilgalys & Moncalvo (2001)
78. Coprinopsis iocularis (Uljé) La Chiusa & Boffelli (2017)
79. Coprinopsis jamaicensis (Murrill) Redhead, Vilgalys & Moncalvo (2001)
80. Coprinopsis jonesii (Peck) Redhead, Vilgalys & Moncalvo (2001)
81. Coprinopsis karwinicola (Grgur.) J.A. Simpson & Grgur. (2001)
82. Coprinopsis kimurae (Hongo & Aoki) Redhead, Vilgalys & Moncalvo (2001)
83. Coprinopsis krieglsteineri (Bender) Redhead, Vilgalys & Moncalvo (2001)
84. Coprinopsis kubickae (Pilát & Svrček) Redhead, Vilgalys & Moncalvo (2001)
85. Coprinopsis laanii (Kits van Wav.) Redhead, Vilgalys & Moncalvo (2001)
86. Coprinopsis laciniatiloma Voto (2021)
87. Coprinopsis lagopides (P. Karst.) Redhead, Vilgalys & Moncalvo (2001)
88. Coprinopsis lagopus (Fr.) Redhead, Vilgalys & Moncalvo (2001)
89. Coprinopsis lotinae (Picón) Picón (2011)
90. Coprinopsis luteocephala (Watling) Redhead, Vilgalys & Moncalvo (2001)
91. Coprinopsis macrocephala (Berk.) Redhead, Vilgalys & Moncalvo (2001)
92. Coprinopsis macrocystidiata Voto (2021)
93. Coprinopsis macropus (Berk. & Broome) Redhead, Vilgalys & Moncalvo (2001)
94. Coprinopsis maculata (Dennis) Voto (2019)
95. Coprinopsis marcescibilis (Britzelm.) Örstadius & E. Larss. (2008)
96. Coprinopsis marcida (Bogart) Redhead, Vilgalys & Moncalvo (2001)
97. Coprinopsis martinii (P.D. Orton) Redhead, Vilgalys & Moncalvo (2001)
98. Coprinopsis maysoidispora (Redhead & Traquair) Redhead, Vilgalys & Moncalvo (2001)
99. Coprinopsis melanthina (Fr.) Örstadius & E. Larss. (2015)
100. Coprinopsis mexicana (Murrill) Redhead, Vilgalys & Moncalvo (2001)
101. Coprinopsis mitrispora (Bohus) L. Nagy, Vágvölgyi & Papp (2013)
102. Coprinopsis musae Örstadius & E. Larss. (2015)
103. Coprinopsis myceliocephala (M. Lange) Redhead, Vilgalys & Moncalvo (2001)
104. Coprinopsis mycophila Voto (2021)
105. Coprinopsis narcotica (Batsch) Redhead, Vilgalys & Moncalvo (2001)
106. Coprinopsis natarajanii Devadatha, Kumaresan & V.V. Sarma (2021)
107. Coprinopsis nemoralis (Bender) La Chiusa & Boffelli (2017)
108. Coprinopsis neocinerea P.T. Nguyen, Fukiharu & K. Shimizu (2019)
109. Coprinopsis neolagopus (Hongo & Sagara) Redhead, Vilgalys & Moncalvo (2001)
110. Coprinopsis neophlyctidospora Raut, Fukiharu & A. Suzuki (2011)
111. Coprinopsis neotropica (Redhead & Pegler) Redhead, Vilgalys & Moncalvo (2001)
112. Coprinopsis nevillei Guy García & Vellinga (2010)
113. Coprinopsis nigra Voto (2021)
114. Coprinopsis nivea (Pers.) Redhead, Vilgalys & Moncalvo (2001)
115. Coprinopsis novorugosobispora Fukiharu & Yamakoshi (2013)
116. Coprinopsis ochraceolanata (Bas) Redhead, Vilgalys & Moncalvo (2001)
117. Coprinopsis pachyderma (Bogart) Redhead, Vilgalys & Moncalvo (2001)
118. Coprinopsis pachysperma (P.D. Orton) Redhead, Vilgalys & Moncalvo (2001)
119. Coprinopsis pachysphaerophora Voto (2021)
120. Coprinopsis paleotropica (Redhead & Pegler) Redhead, Vilgalys & Moncalvo (2001)
121. Coprinopsis pallidipygata Voto (2021)
122. Coprinopsis pannucioides (J.E. Lange) Örstadius & E. Larss. (2008)
123. Coprinopsis papagoensis (Lindsey & Gilb.) Redhead, Vilgalys & Moncalvo (2001)
124. Coprinopsis parvilurida Voto (2021)
125. Coprinopsis pentagonospora Voto (2021)
126. Coprinopsis pernambucensis Voto (2020)
127. Coprinopsis phaeocalyptrata Voto (2021)
128. Coprinopsis phaeochlamys Voto (2021)
129. Coprinopsis phaeopunctata (Esteve-Rav. & A. Ortega) Valade (2014)
130. Coprinopsis phaeospora (P. Karst.) P. Karst. (1881)
131. Coprinopsis phlyctidospora (Romagn.) Redhead, Vilgalys & Moncalvo (2001)
132. Coprinopsis picacea (Bull.) Redhead, Vilgalys & Moncalvo (2001)
133. Coprinopsis piepenbroekorum (Uljé & Bas) Redhead, Vilgalys & Moncalvo (2001)
134. Coprinopsis pilosotomentosa (Bender) La Chiusa & Boffelli (2017)
135. Coprinopsis pinguispora (Bogart) Redhead, Vilgalys & Moncalvo (2001)
136. Coprinopsis platypus (Berk.) Voto (2019)
137. Coprinopsis poliomalla (Romagn.) Doveri, Granito & Lunghini (2005)
138. Coprinopsis psammophila Mešić & Tkalčec (2019)
139. Coprinopsis pseudocortinata (Locq. ex Cacialli, Caroti & Doveri) Doveri, Granito & Lunghini (2005)
140. Coprinopsis pseudofriesii (Pilát & Svrček) Redhead, Vilgalys & Moncalvo (2001)
141. Coprinopsis pseudomarcescibilis Heykoop, G. Moreno & P. Alvarado (2017)
142. Coprinopsis pseudonivea (Bender & Uljé) Redhead, Vilgalys & Moncalvo (2001)
143. Coprinopsis pseudoradiata (Kühner & Joss. ex Watling) Redhead, Vilgalys & Moncalvo (2001)
144. Coprinopsis psychromorbida (Redhead & Traquair) Redhead, Vilgalys & Moncalvo (2001)
145. Coprinopsis pulchricaerulea T. Lebel, Padamsee & T.W. May (2022)
146. Coprinopsis punctata (Kalchbr.) Voto (2019)
147. Coprinopsis quinaultensis Voto (2021)
148. Coprinopsis radiata (Bolton) Redhead, Vilgalys & Moncalvo (2001)
149. Coprinopsis radicans (Romagn.) Redhead, Vilgalys & Moncalvo (2001)
150. Coprinopsis radicata (Cleland) J.A. Simpson & Grgur. (2001)
151. Coprinopsis ramosocystidiata (Bender) La Chiusa & Boffelli (2017)
152. Coprinopsis rhizophora (Kawam. ex Hongo & K. Yokoy.) D.J. Schaf. & B. Douglas (2020)
153. Coprinopsis romagnesiana (Singer) Redhead, Vilgalys & Moncalvo (2001)
154. Coprinopsis rugosobispora (J. Geesink & Imler ex Walleyn) A. Melzer & Schößler (2016)
155. Coprinopsis rugosomagnispora Gierczyk, Pietras, Piątek, Gryc, Czerniawski & Rodr.-Flakus (2017)
156. Coprinopsis saccharomyces (P.D. Orton) P. Roux & Guy García (2006)
157. Coprinopsis saccospora (Singer) Voto (2020)
158. Coprinopsis sclerotiger (Watling) Redhead, Vilgalys & Moncalvo (2001)
159. Coprinopsis sclerotiorum (Horvers & de Cock) Redhead, Vilgalys & Moncalvo (2001)
160. Coprinopsis scobicola (P.D. Orton) Redhead, Vilgalys & Moncalvo (2001)
161. Coprinopsis semitalis (P.D. Orton) Redhead, Vilgalys & Moncalvo (2001)
162. Coprinopsis siskiyouensis Voto (2021)
163. Coprinopsis spilospora (Romagn.) Redhead, Vilgalys & Moncalvo (2001)
164. Coprinopsis stangliana (Enderle, Bender & Gröger) Redhead, Vilgalys & Moncalvo (2001)
165. Coprinopsis stercorea (Fr.) Redhead, Vilgalys & Moncalvo (2001)
166. Coprinopsis striata (Bogart) Redhead, Vilgalys & Moncalvo (2001)
167. Coprinopsis strossmayeri (Schulzer) Redhead, Vilgalys & Moncalvo (2001)
168. Coprinopsis subaquatica Voto (2021)
169. Coprinopsis subcurta (Thiers) Voto (2020)
170. Coprinopsis subcylindrosporus (E. Ludw.) U. Täglich (2018)
171. Coprinopsis subdomestica (Murrill) D. Wächt. & A. Melzer (2020)
172. Coprinopsis submicrospora (Heykoop & G. Moreno) Örstadius & E. Larss. (2015)
173. Coprinopsis subtigrinella (Dennis) Redhead, Vilgalys & Moncalvo (2001)
174. Coprinopsis superba Voto (2021)
175. Coprinopsis sylvicola (Bogart) Redhead, Vilgalys & Moncalvo (2001)
176. Coprinopsis tectispora (Bogart) Redhead, Vilgalys & Moncalvo (2001)
177. Coprinopsis tigrina (Pat.) Redhead, Vilgalys & Moncalvo (2001)
178. Coprinopsis tigrinella (Boud.) Redhead, Vilgalys & Moncalvo (2001)
179. Coprinopsis trispora (Kemp & Watling) Redhead, Vilgalys & Moncalvo (2001)
180. Coprinopsis tuberosa (Quél.) Doveri, Granito & Lunghini (2005)
181. Coprinopsis udicola Örstadius, A. Melzer & E. Larss. (2015)
182. Coprinopsis uliginicola (McKnight & A.H. Sm.) Örstadius & E. Larss
183. Coprinopsis undulata (Bogart) Redhead, Vilgalys & Moncalvo (2001)
184. Coprinopsis urticicola (Berk. & Broome) Redhead, Vilgalys & Moncalvo (2001)
185. Coprinopsis utrifer (Joss. ex Watling) Redhead, Vilgalys & Moncalvo (2001)
186. Coprinopsis variegata (Peck) Redhead, Vilgalys & Moncalvo (2001)
187. Coprinopsis vermiculifer (Joss. ex Dennis) Redhead, Vilgalys & Moncalvo (2001)
188. Coprinopsis verticillata (Schulz-Wedd.) Redhead, Vilgalys & Moncalvo (2001)
189. Coprinopsis villosa L. Nagy, Desjardin, Vägvölgyi & Papp (2012)
190. Coprinopsis xantholepis (P.D. Orton) Redhead, Vilgalys & Moncalvo (2001)
191. Coprinopsis xenobia (P.D. Orton) Redhead, Vilgalys & Moncalvo (2001)
