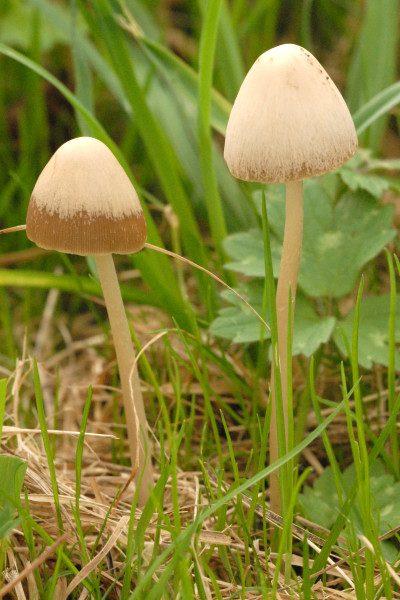

Scientific classification
- Domain: Eukaryota
- Kingdom: Fungi
- Division: Basidiomycota
- Class: Agaricomycetes
- Order: Agaricales
- Family: Psathyrellaceae
- Genus: Coprinopsis
- Species: C. marcescibilis

Binomial name
- Coprinopsis marcescibilis (Britzelm.) Örstadius & E.Larss. (2008)

Synonyms
- Agaricus marcescibilis Britzelm. (1893); Psathyrella marcescibilis (Britzelm.) Singer (1951)

= Coprinopsis marcescibilis =

Species of mushroom-forming fungus

Coprinopsis marcescibilis is a species of agaric fungus in the family Psathyrellaceae, originally described by Max Britzelmayr as Agaricus marcescibilis in 1893 before being reclassified in 2008 following molecular phylogenetics studies that reorganized the traditional genus Coprinus. This small saprobic fungus produces grey-brown hygrophanous caps that fade to whitish when dry, with white gills that darken to brown with age, and grows on nutrient-rich soils and decaying wood, particularly in urban green spaces. The species has a broad yet scattered distribution, with documented occurrences across Europe, North America, North Africa, and parts of Asia, and phylogenetic analysis indicates it diverged from Coprinopsis cinerea about 131 million years ago.

== Taxonomy ==
Coprinopsis marcescibilis was originally described in 1893 by Max Britzelmayr as Agaricus marcescibilis. Molecular phylogenetics work revealed that Coprinus sensu lato (in the broad sense) was polyphyletic, so Redhead and colleages (2001) restricted Coprinus to the shaggy inkcap clade and segregated the remaining taxa into four genera—Coprinus sensu stricto (in the strict sense), Coprinopsis, Coprinellus and Parasola—all within Psathyrellaceae.

Comparative genomics analyses based on 2353 single‑copy orthologous genes confirm that C. marcescibilis forms a well‑supported clade with Coprinopsis cinerea, from which it diverged about 131 million years ago; this clade is distinct from the Coprinellus and Candolleomyces lineages sampled in the study.

In a multilocus rDNA phylogeny of coprophilous (dung-loving) Psathyrella and allied genera, Larsson and Örstadius (2008) recovered four major clades within Psathyrellaceae—Parasola, Coprinopsis, Lacrymaria/Spadiceae and Psathyrella—using combined ITS and LSU data. Agaricus marcescibilis fell within the Coprinopsis clade, sharing a pileipellis of short, cutis‑type hyphae and lack of clamp connections typical of that genus. On this basis they proposed the new combination Coprinopsis marcescibilis.

== Description ==
The fruit body of Psathyrella marcescibilis is small, with a cap (pileus) 10–25 mm across. Young caps are hemispherical, becoming conical and finally broadly convex with a slightly raised centre. The surface is dull and hygrophanous—grey‑brown and showing translucent radial striations when moist, fading to cream or whitish (occasionally with a pink tinge) as it dries. The margin is acute and may bear hanging fibrils in young specimens. The flesh is thin, grey‑brown to whitish, odourless and of mild but indistinct taste.

The lamellae are adnate to narrowly adnexed, white at first, turning grey‑brown to dark brown, and the edges bear fine white hairs that darken with age. The stipe is 30–60 mm long and 1.5–3 mm thick, cylindrical and sometimes swollen at the base, hollow and bearing a fragile short pseudorhiza. Its surface is clothed in white fibres and flakes, becoming pruinose (powdery) towards the apex.

Microscopically, spores are smooth, ovoid, reddish‑brown, 10–14 by 6–7.5 micrometre (μm), each with a germ pore. Basidia are club-shaped (clavate), mostly four‑spored, 18–26 by 12–14 μm, occasionally with a basal clamp connection. Cheilocystidia are utriform to rostrate, 27–60 by 8–15 μm, and pleurocystidia are absent.

== Habitat and distribution ==
Coprinopsis marcescibilis is a saprobic fungus, occurring singly or in small groups on nutrient‑rich soils and on decaying wood or bark, especially in urban green spaces. Basidiocarps have been collected along the edge of a sidewalk in Szczytnicki Park, Wrocław, Poland, where they emerged from fertile soil mixed with decaying pine wood and bark in late July.

The species has a broad but scattered distribution. It is known from Europe (including Poland, Germany and the Czech Republic), North America and North Africa (Morocco), and has been reported from Asia, with the first Korean record in 2008.

== See also ==
- List of Coprinopsis species
