= Harefoot =

Harefoot may refer to:

- Harold Harefoot, King of England from 1035 to 1040
- Harefoot mushroom, Coprinopsis lagopus
