= Coprinopsis vermiculifer =

Scientific classification
- Domain: Eukaryota
- Kingdom: Fungi
- Division: Basidiomycota
- Class: Agaricomycetes
- Order: Agaricales
- Family: Psathyrellaceae
- Genus: Coprinopsis
- Species: C. vermiculifer

Binomial name
- Coprinopsis vermiculifer (Joss. ex Dennis) Redhead, Vilgalys & Moncalvo (2001)

Synonyms
- Coprinus vermiculifer Joss. ex Dennis; Coprinus vermiculifer Joss.

Species of fungus

Coprinopsis vermiculifer is a species of coprophilous fungus in the family Psathyrellaceae. It is known to grow on the dung of goats.

== See also ==
- List of Coprinopsis species
