= Coprinus dunarum =

Scientific classification
- Domain: Eukaryota
- Kingdom: Fungi
- Division: Basidiomycota
- Class: Agaricomycetes
- Order: Agaricales
- Family: Agaricaceae
- Genus: Coprinus
- Species: C. dunarum

Binomial name
- Coprinus dunarum Stoll

Species of fungus

Coprinus dunarum is a species of fungus belonging to the family Agaricaceae.

A 2015 study of its genomic DNA sequence concluded that it was synonymous with Coprinopsis acuminata.
