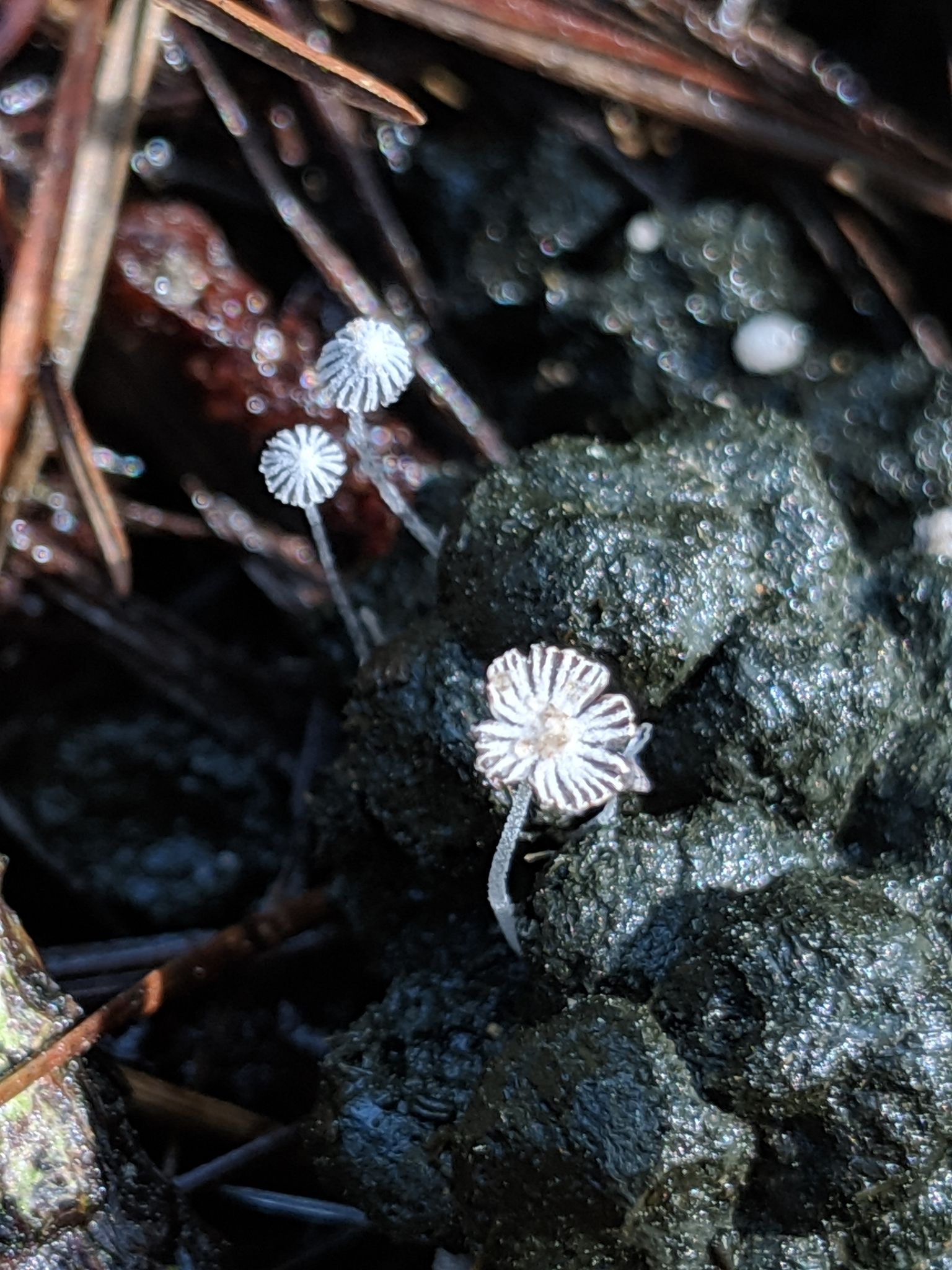

Scientific classification
- Kingdom: Fungi
- Division: Basidiomycota
- Class: Agaricomycetes
- Order: Agaricales
- Family: Psathyrellaceae
- Genus: Coprinopsis
- Species: C. stercorea

Binomial name
- Coprinopsis stercorea (Fr.) Redhead, Vilgalys & Moncalvo (2001)

Synonyms
- Agaricus stercorarius Bull.; Agaricus stercorarius Bull. ex St Amans; Coprinus stercorarius Bull.; Coprinus stercorarius Bull. ex Fr.; Coprinus stercorarius Sacc.; Coprinus stercorarius f. diverticulatus Kits van Wav.; Coprinus stercorarius var. diverticulatus (Kits van Wav.) Bogart; Coprinus stercoreus Fr.; Fungus stercorarius Kuntze

= Coprinopsis stercorea =

Species of fungus

Coprinopsis stercorea, commonly known as the dung-loving inky cap, is a species of coprophilous fungus in the family Psathyrellaceae. It grows on the dung of sheep, goats and donkeys.

== Taxonomy ==
Coprinopsis stercorea was first described in 1782 as Agaricus stercoreus. Over time, it has had many different names, including Agaricus ephemerus var. stercoreus, Fungus stercoreus, and Coprinus stercoreus. In 2021, it was transferred from the genus Coprinus to Coprinopsis.

== Description ==
The cap of Coprinopsis stercorea is about 4-10 millimeters in diameter and starts out egg-shaped, before expanding and becoming flat with age. The stipe is 1–3.5 centimeters long and 0.5-1 millimeters wide. The gills are adnexed and start out grayish, before turning black and deliquescing. The cap can be hairy or scaly, and the stipe can be hairy or powdery.

Coprinopsis stercorea is similar to several other species of inky caps, many of them only distinguishable under a microscope. C. ephemeroides resembles C. stercorea, but has a ring around the stipe.

== Habitat and ecology ==
Coprinopsis stercorea
- Mycological characteristics
- Gills on hymenium
- Cap is ovate or flat
- Hymenium is adnexed
- Stipe is bare
- Ecology is saprotrophic
- Edibility is unknown

Coprinopsis stercorea is found on dung. While it usually grows on herbivore dung, it is occasionally found on dog and bear dung.

== See also ==
- List of Coprinopsis species
