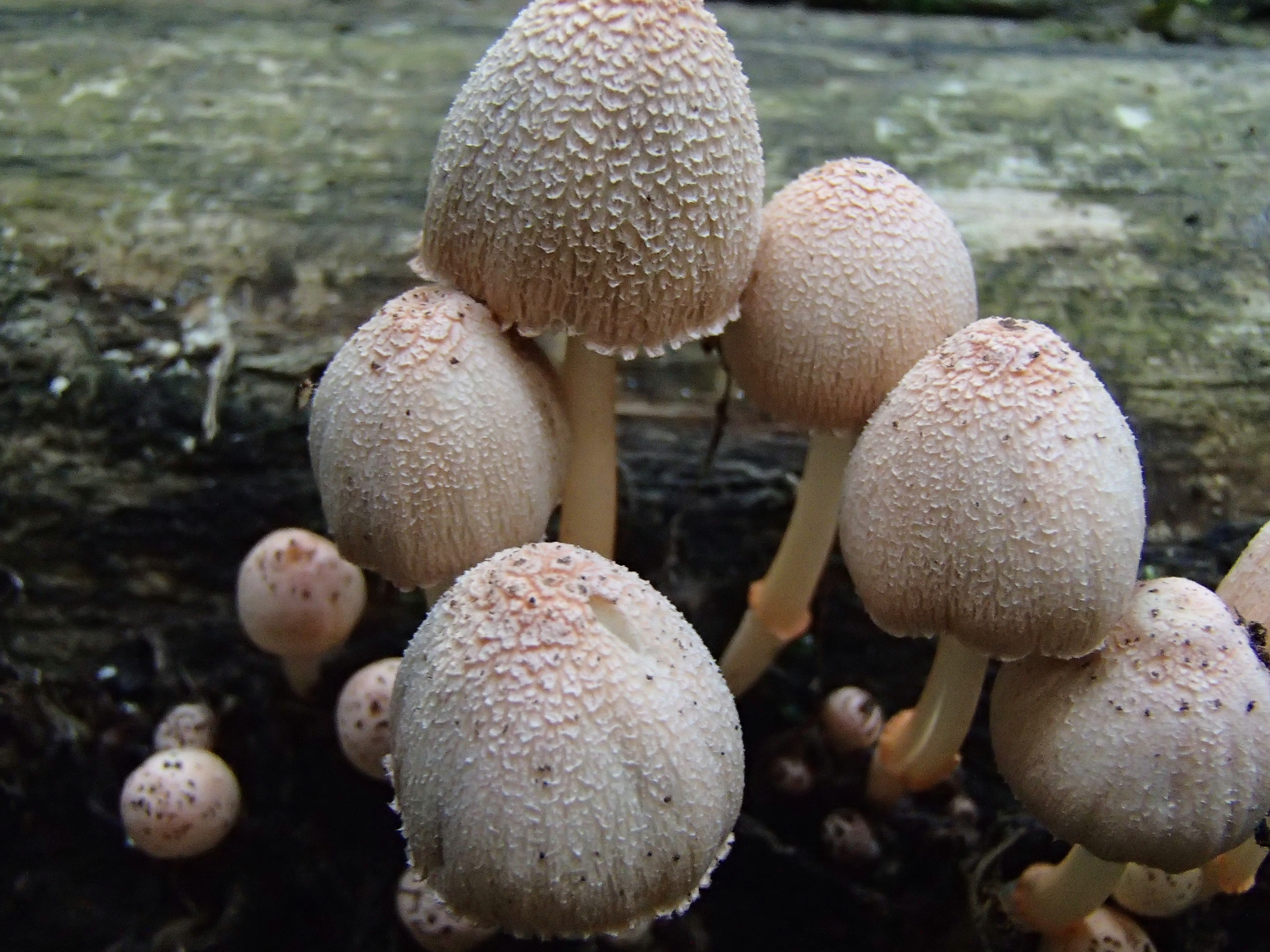

Scientific classification
- Domain: Eukaryota
- Kingdom: Fungi
- Division: Basidiomycota
- Class: Agaricomycetes
- Order: Agaricales
- Family: Psathyrellaceae
- Genus: Coprinopsis
- Species: C. mexicana

Binomial name
- Coprinopsis mexicana (Murrill) Redhead, Vilgalys & Moncalvo (2001)

Synonyms
- Coprinus mexicanus Murrill (1918)

= Coprinopsis mexicana =

Species of fungus

Coprinopsis mexicana is a species of fungus in the family Psathyrellaceae. Originally described in 1918 as Coprinus mexicanus by American mycologist William Alphonso Murrill, it was transferred to Coprinopsis in 2001.

== See also ==
- List of Coprinopsis species
