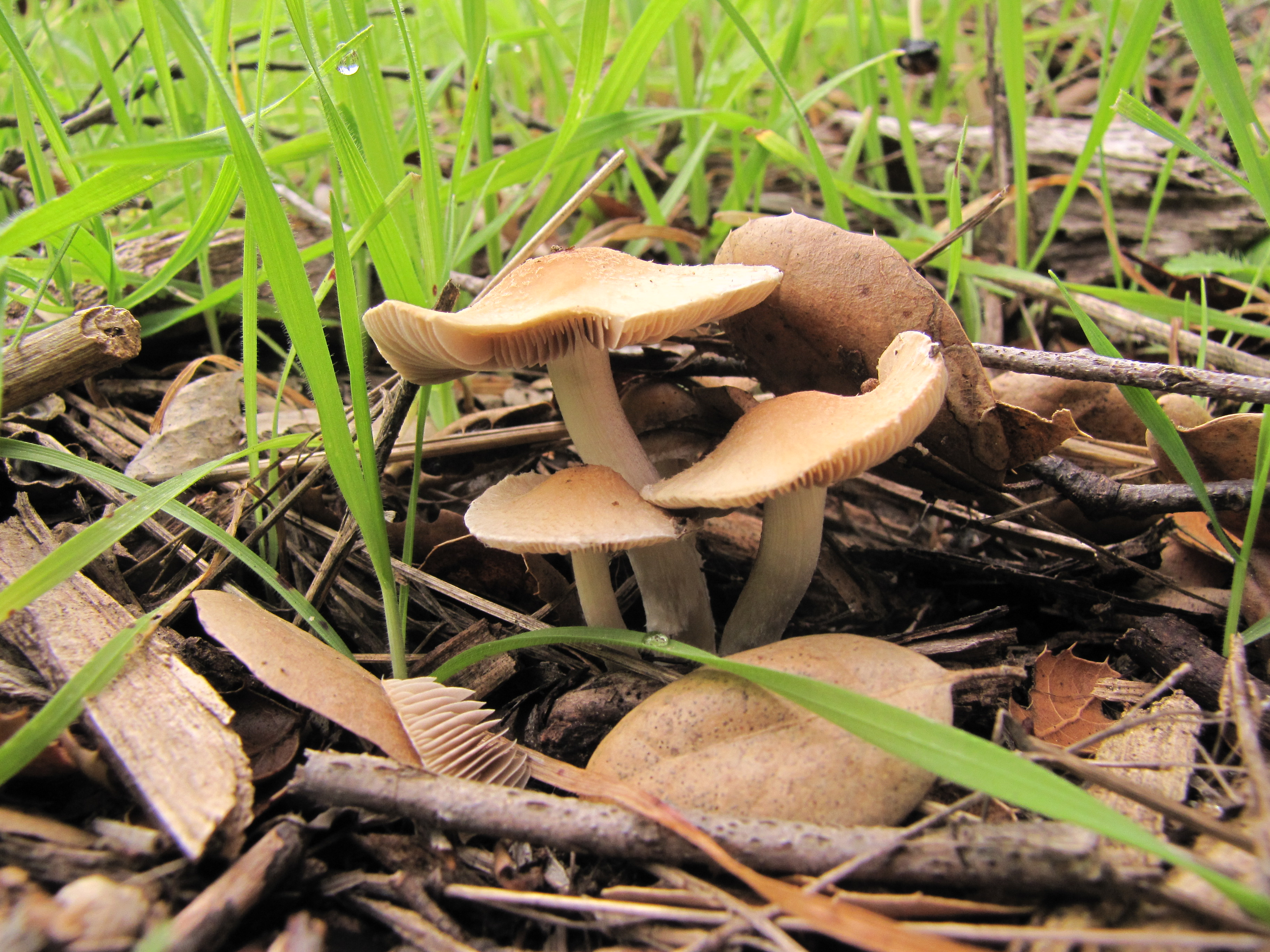
- picture of Coprinopsis uliginicola

Scientific classification
- Domain: Eukaryota
- Kingdom: Fungi
- Division: Basidiomycota
- Class: Agaricomycetes
- Order: Agaricales
- Family: Psathyrellaceae
- Genus: Coprinopsis
- Species: C. uliginicola

Binomial name
- Coprinopsis uliginicola (McKnight & A.H.Sm.) Örstadius & E.Larss (2015)

Synonyms
- Psathyrella uliginicola McKnight & A.H.Sm. (1972)

= Coprinopsis uliginicola =

Species of fungus

Coprinopsis uliginicola is a species of agaric fungus in the family Psathyrellaceae. It was formally described by mycologists Kent McKnight and Alexander H. Smith in 1972. It was moved into the genus Coprinopsis in 2015 by Leif Örstadius & Ellen Larsson based on DNA sequences obtained from the holotype. Found in the United States, the paratype collection was made by Smith in the Nez Perce National Forest (Idaho) in 1962. Smith noted the species to also occur in New Mexico, Utah, and Wyoming, where it grows in wet areas under brush or on decaying aspen wood.

== See also ==
- List of Coprinopsis species
