= Coprinopsis pseudoradiata =

Scientific classification
- Kingdom: Fungi
- Division: Basidiomycota
- Class: Agaricomycetes
- Order: Agaricales
- Family: Psathyrellaceae
- Genus: Coprinopsis
- Species: C. pseudoradiata

Binomial name
- Coprinopsis pseudoradiata (Kühner & Joss. ex Watling) Redhead, Vilgalys & Moncalvo (2001)

Synonyms
- Coprinus pseudoradiatus Kühner & Joss.; Coprinus pseudoradiatus Kühner & Joss. ex Watling

Species of fungus

Coprinopsis pseudoradiata is a species of coprophilous fungus in the family Psathyrellaceae. It grows on the dung of sheep.

== See also ==
- List of Coprinopsis species
