= COP6 =

COP6 may refer to:

- United Nations Climate Change conference#2000: COP 6, The Hague, Netherlands
- (-)-alpha-cuprenene synthase, an enzyme
