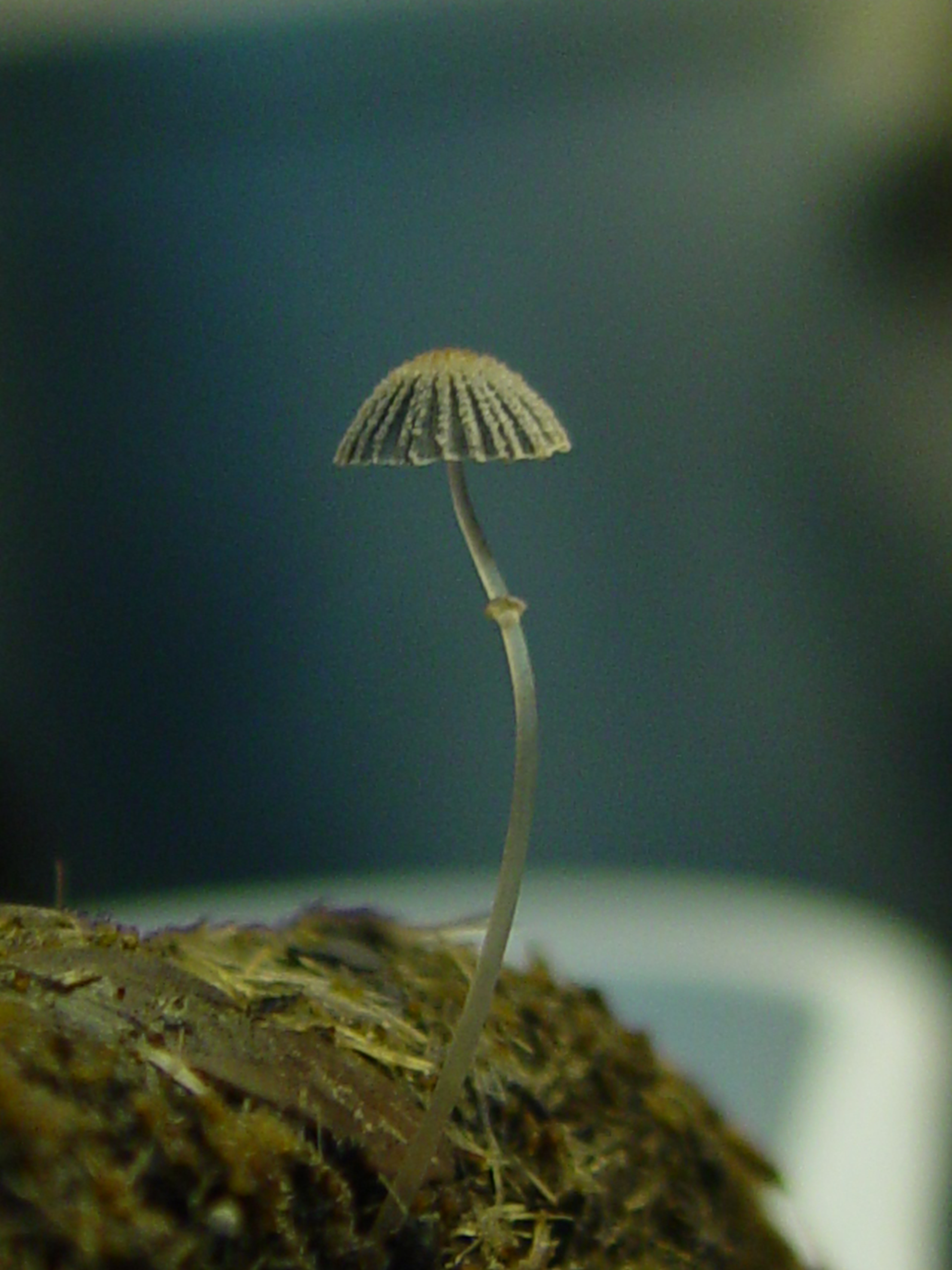

Scientific classification
- Kingdom: Fungi
- Division: Basidiomycota
- Class: Agaricomycetes
- Order: Agaricales
- Family: Psathyrellaceae
- Genus: Coprinopsis
- Species: C. ephemeroides

Binomial name
- Coprinopsis ephemeroides (DC.) G.Moreno (2010)

Synonyms
- Agaricus ephemeroides DC. (1805); Coprinus ephemeroides (DC.) Fr. (1838); Coprinus hendersonii (Berk.) Fr. (1838); Coprinus bulbillosus Pat. (1889); Coprinus hendersonii var. intermedius S.Petersen (1911)

= Coprinopsis ephemeroides =

Species of fungus

Coprinopsis ephemeroides, commonly known as the ringed dung inky cap, is a species of agaric fungus in the family Psathyrellaceae.

== Taxonomy ==
First described as Agaricus ephemeroides by Swiss botanist Augustin Pyramus de Candolle in 1805, it was transferred to the genus Coprinopsis in 2010 by Gabriel Moreno.

== Description ==
The semitranslucent cap is up to 5 millimetres (1/4 in) wide and the stipe 6 centimetres (2 1/4 in) long.

== See also ==
- List of Coprinopsis species
