= (−)-alpha-cuprenene synthase =

Class of enzymes

(−)-α-cuprenene synthase

Identifiers
- EC no.: 4.2.3.95

Databases
- IntEnz: IntEnz view
- BRENDA: BRENDA entry
- ExPASy: NiceZyme view
- KEGG: KEGG entry
- MetaCyc: metabolic pathway
- PRIAM: profile
- PDB structures: RCSB PDB PDBe PDBsum
Search
- PMC: articles
- PubMed: articles
- NCBI: proteins

(−)-α-Cuprenene synthase (EC 4.2.3.95, Cop6) is an enzyme with systematic name (−)-α -cuprenene hydrolase (cyclizing, (−)-α-cuprenene-forming). This enzyme catalyses the following chemical reaction

(2E,6E)-farnesyl diphosphate $\rightleftharpoons$ (−)-α-cuprenene + diphosphate

The enzyme from the fungus Coprinopsis cinerea produces (−)-α-cuprenene with high selectivity.
