= Coprinopsis martinii =

Scientific classification
- Kingdom: Fungi
- Division: Basidiomycota
- Class: Agaricomycetes
- Order: Agaricales
- Family: Psathyrellaceae
- Genus: Coprinopsis
- Species: C. martinii

Binomial name
- Coprinopsis martinii (P.D.Orton) Redhead, Vilgalys & Moncalvo (2001)

Synonyms
- Coprinus martinii P.D.Orton(1960); Coprinellus martinii Redhead, Vilgalys & Moncalvo (2001)

Species of fungus

Coprinopsis martinii
- Mycological characteristics
- Gills on hymenium
- Cap is convex or campanulate
- Hymenium is free
- Stipe is bare
- Spore print is black
- Ecology is saprotrophic
- Edibility is unknown

Coprinopsis martinii is a species of mushroom producing fungus in the family Psathyrellaceae.

== Taxonomy ==
It was first described in 1960 by the English mycologist Peter Darbishire Orton and classified as Coprinus martinii.

In 2001 phylogentic analysis restructured the Coprinus genus and it was reclassified as Coprinopsis martinii by the mycologists Scott Alan Redhead, Rytas J. Vilgalys & Jean-Marc Moncalvo.

== Description ==
Coprinus martinii is a small inkcap mushroom which grows in wetland environments.

Cap: 0.5-2.2cm. Starts ovoid and expands to convex and then campanulate (bell shaped). Sometimes presenting as umbonate. Grey and covered in powdery fragments of the veil. Gills: Start white before turning black and deliquescing (dissolving into an ink-like black substance). Crowded. Stem: 3.2-6cm long and 1.5-2mm in diameter. Pale grey and tapering towards a slightly swollen base. Spore print: Black. Spores: Ellipsoid and smooth with a germ pore. 12.-16 x 6.5-8.5 μm. Taste: Indistinct. Smell: Indistinct.

== Habitat and distribution ==
Grows trooping in small groups on rotting sedges and rushes belonging to the genera Carex, Scirpus and Juncus. Found in marshes and wetland environments spring through autumn. Widespread but seldom recorded.
