= Cospin =

Enzyme

Cospin is a serine protease inhibitor from the mushroom species Coprinopsis cinerea in the phylum Basidiomycota. (Cospin is a protein found in the mushroom Coprinopsis cinerea that helps block the activity of certain enzymes called serine proteases).

== Cospin [PIC1] ==
It has similar biochemical properties to other well characterized fungal serine protease inhibitors of family I66 in the MEROPS classification.(Cospin is similar to other proteins in fungi that do the same job and belong to a group known as family I66 in the MEROPS classification system) Cospin is one of the few serine protease inhibitors of basidiomycete that have been isolated and characterized. It is highly expressed in sexual reproductive structures termed fruiting bodies and has been cloned and characterized at the molecular and functional levels. (It is found in high amounts in the mushroom's fruiting bodies, which are its reproductive structures. Scientists have studied cospin at both the genetic and functional levels to understand how it works).

== Genetic background ==
The cospin PIC 1 gene sequence isolated from fruiting bodies of the C. cinerea strain AmutBmut can be found under GenBank TM accession number ACX48485.

== Biochemical properties ==
Cospin is a small protein and a highly specific trypsin inhibitor. pH stability Recombinant purified Cospin has been found to remain active after incubation in acidic pH 3 and alkaline pH 11 conditions. Crystal structure Cospin is based on a β-trefoil fold. The cospin fold resembles a tree-like structure with 2 loops in the root region, a stem comprising a six-stranded β-barrel, and two layers of loops in the crown region. Cospin, is the first fungal trypsin inhibitor with a determined 3D structure, it utilizes a different loop for trypsin inhibition compared to other beta-trefoil inhibitors. Substrate binding“cospin is a classic inhibitor that binds to the active site in a substrate-like manner and forms a tight and stable complex with trypsin.” Cospin biotoxicity is not lethal to amoeba A.castellanii, nematode Caenorhabditis elegans, and two true fly species. The toxicity caused developmental delay in both pupae and flies.

== Application ==
Cospin plays a defensive role against predators and parasites. Cospin toxicity targets specifically fruit fly D. melanogaster. Cospin represents one type of fungal protein mediated defence against fungivorous insects. Cospin a serine protease inhibitor can be of use in various applications ranging from pest management, crop protection to drug development, design for therapeutics, and basic medical research.
