= Coprinopsis aesontiensis =

Scientific classification
- Kingdom: Fungi
- Division: Basidiomycota
- Class: Agaricomycetes
- Order: Agaricales
- Family: Psathyrellaceae
- Genus: Coprinopsis
- Species: C. aesontiensis

Binomial name
- Coprinopsis aesontiensis A. Melzer, Ferisin & Dovana (2016)

Species of fungus

- Mycological characteristics
- Gills on hymenium
- Cap is campanulate or conical
- Hymenium is free
- Stipe is bare
- Ecology is saprotrophic
- Edibility is unknown

Coprinopsis aesontiensis is a species of mushroom producing fungus in the family Psathyrellaceae.

== Taxonomy ==
It was first described in 2016 by the Italian mycologists Andreas Melzer, Giuliano Ferisin & Francesco Dovana and classified as Coprinopsis aesontiensis based on DNA analysis.

== Description ==
Coprinopsis aesontiensis is a small grey mushroom found rarely in North Eastern Italy.

Cap: Up to 30mm wide by 20mm tall. Campanulate (bell shaped) or conical. Grey with small white tufts or powdery scales. Gills: Start white maturing to dark brown. Crowded. Stem: 60-80mm long and 6-8mm in diameter. Slightly bulbous base. White with small hairs or downy tufts. Spores: Ellipsoid with a germ pore. 9.6-10.6 x 5-6 μm. Taste: Indistinct. Smell: Indistinct.

== Habitat and distribution ==
The species was discovered in the North Eastern Friuli-Venezia Giulia region of Italy which borders Austria and Slovenia. Its distribution remains unclear.

== Etymology ==
The specific epithet aesontiensis is named for the Aesontius river, a historical name for the Isonzo river in Slovenia.

== Similar species ==
DNA analysis shows that Coprinopsis pulchricaerulea is closely related. However this species produces a blue pigment and is found in subtropical Australia.
