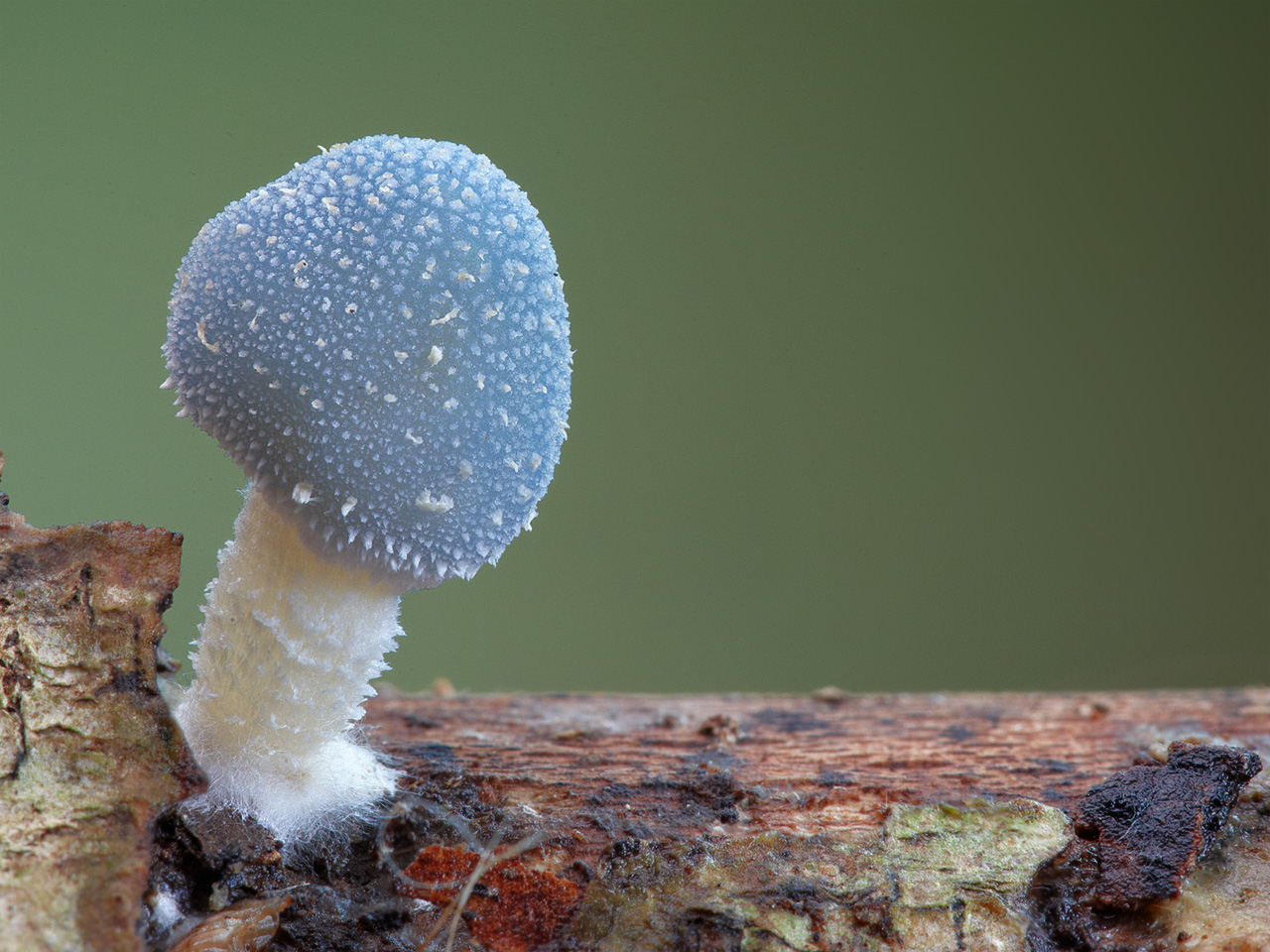

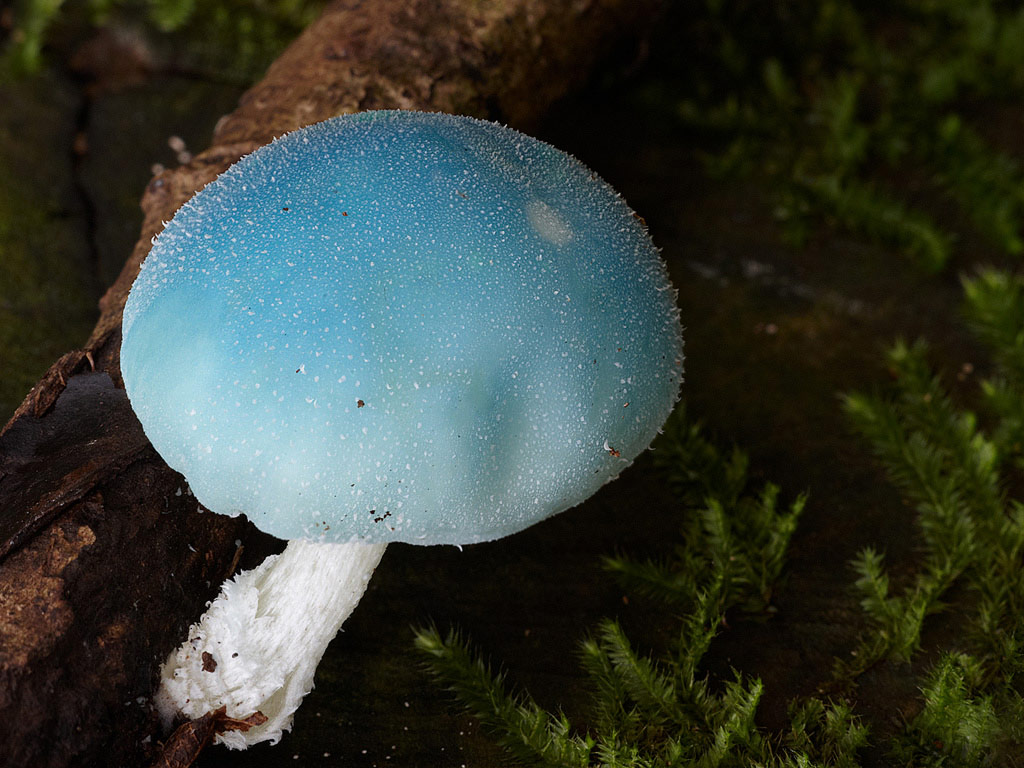

Scientific classification
- Kingdom: Fungi
- Division: Basidiomycota
- Class: Agaricomycetes
- Order: Agaricales
- Family: Psathyrellaceae
- Genus: Coprinopsis
- Species: C. pulchricaerulea

Binomial name
- Coprinopsis pulchricaerulea T.Lebel, Padamsee & T.W.May (2022)

= Coprinopsis pulchricaerulea =

Species of fungus

Coprinopsis pulchricaerulea Mycological characteristics
- Gills on hymenium
- Cap is ovate or convex
- Hymenium attachment is not applicable
- Stipe is bare
- Ecology is saprotrophic
- Edibility is unknown

Coprinopsis pulchricaerulea is a species of mushroom-producing fungus in the family Psathyrellaceae.

== Taxonomy ==
It was first described in 2022 by the mycologists Teresa Lebel, Tom May and Mahajabeen Padamsee and was classified as Coprinopsis pulchricaerulea based on genome analysis – which placed it close to Coprinopsis aesontiensis. Unlike C. aesontiensis, however, C. pulchricaerulea is blue.

== Discovery ==
This species was first discovered by nature photographer Stephen Axford in 2012 growing in subtropical forests in northern New South Wales, Australia. Specimens were sent to the mycology team at the State Herbarium of South Australia where genome sequencing was performed. The species has been erroneously called Leratiomyces atrovirens, especially by many media sources covering the discovery. However the DNA results do not support this and Leratiomyces atrovirens has never been validly published.

== Description ==
Coprinopsis pulchricaerulea is a small blue mushroom found rarely in Australia. It can appear to resemble a secotioid fungus due to the cap which may only partially open and the indistinct structure of the hymenium.

Cap: 8–28mm wide by 6–22mm tall. Starts spherical becoming ovate to convex with age. Pale or bright blue in colour discolouring with grey or green shades with age or when dry. Cap is fragile and covered in fine glistening white powdery warts which may wash off. Specimens collected in New Caledonia had fewer of these warts or were lacking them entirely. Gills: Start white or pale cream maturing to pale tan. Crowded. Stem: 5–20mm long and 3–7mm in diameter. Slightly bulbous base which tapers towards the cap. Has a stem ring towards the base. Spores: Ellipsoid to elongate without germ pore. Nondextrinoid.19–23 x 10–12.5 μm. Taste: Indistinct. Smell: Strong mushroom like smell.

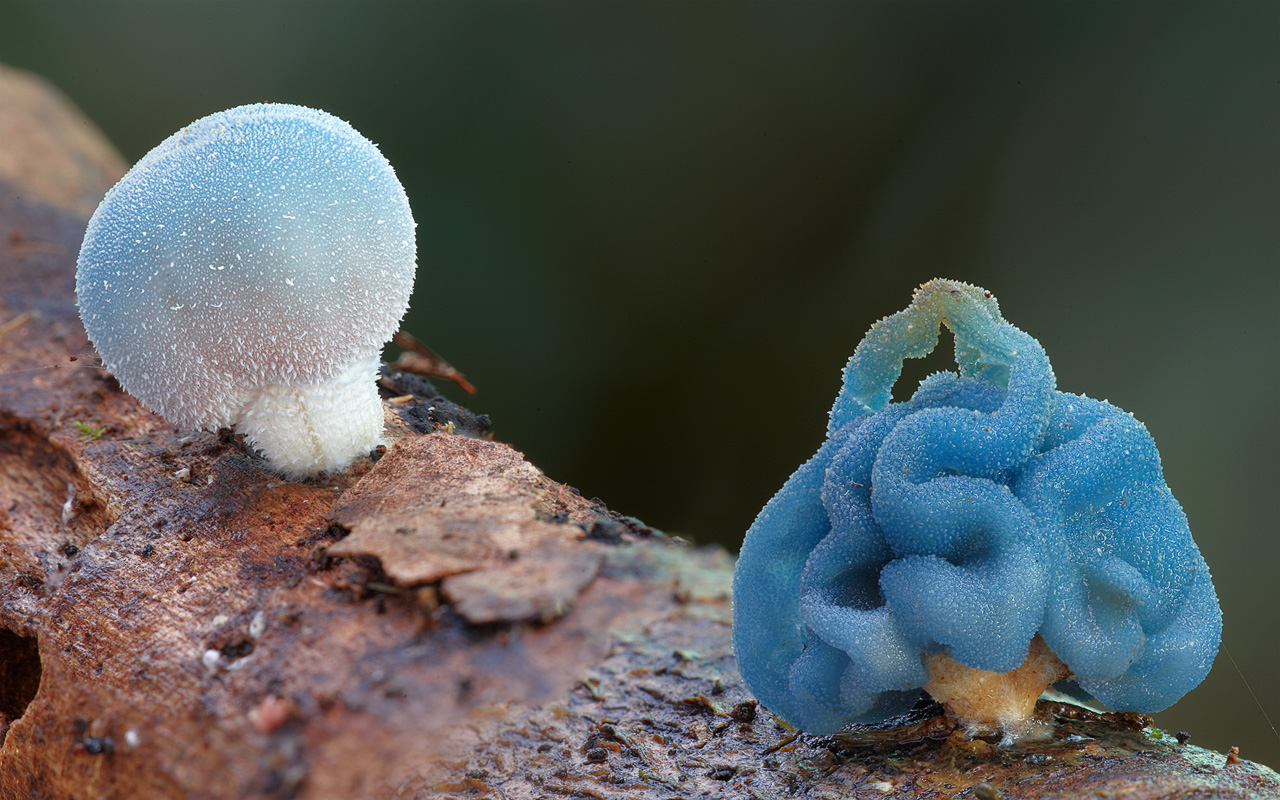
Two C. pulchricaerulea specimens with deformed caps

== Habitat and distribution ==
The specimens examined were found in a small areas of subtropical rainforest in New South Wales, New Caledonia and on Lord Howe Island in Australia. The mushrooms are found growing individually or in small groups on wet decaying logs and leaf litter.

== Etymology ==
The specific epithet pulchricaerulea derives from the Latin pulcher meaning beautiful and caeruleus meaning blue, a reference to the spectacular blue colour of the mushrooms.

== Similar species ==
Molecular taxonomy work shows that Coprinopsis aesontiensis is closely related. However, this species lacks the telltale blue colour and is found in North Eastern Italy.
