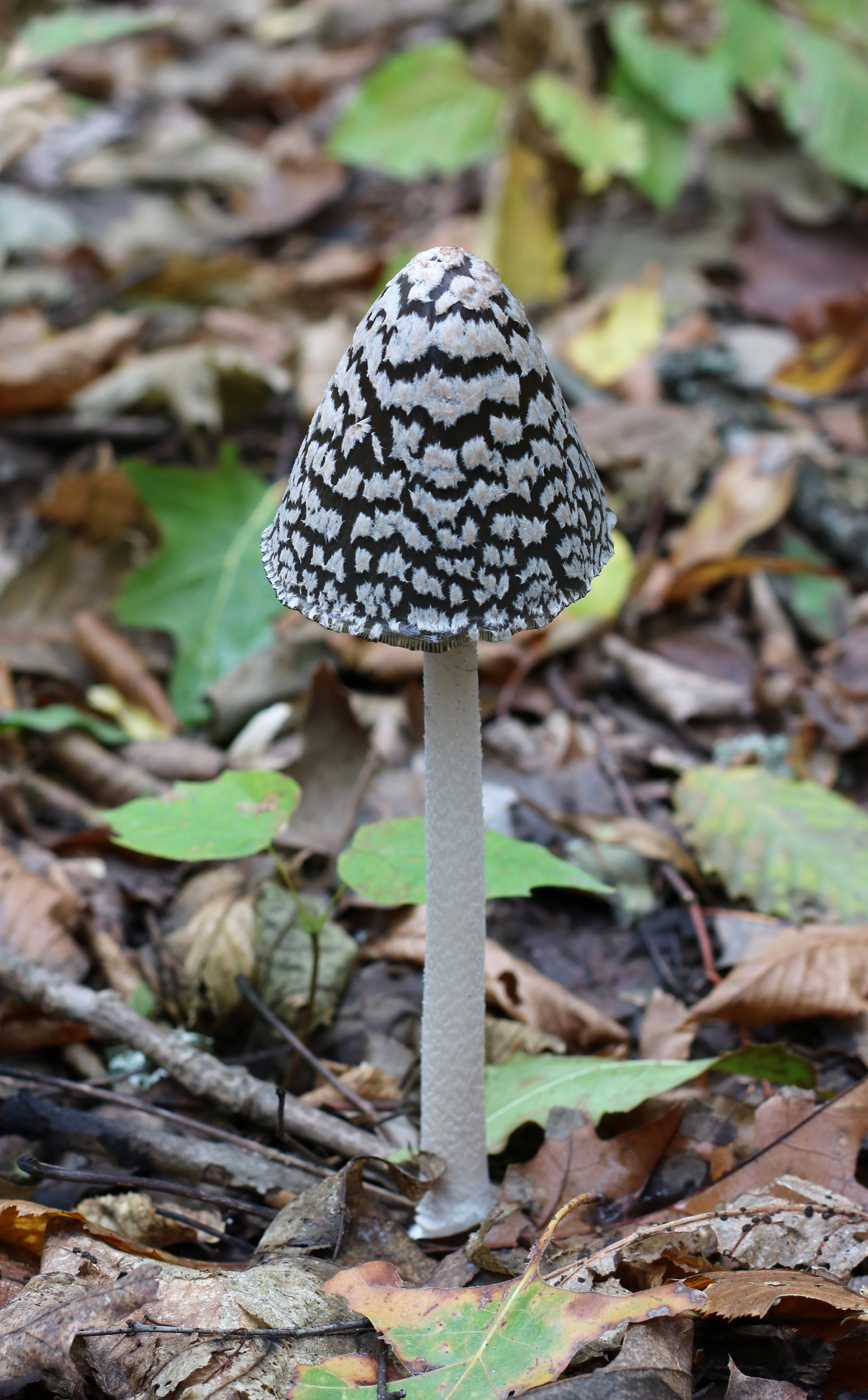

Scientific classification
- Kingdom: Fungi
- Division: Basidiomycota
- Class: Agaricomycetes
- Order: Agaricales
- Family: Psathyrellaceae
- Genus: Coprinopsis
- Species: C. picacea

Binomial name
- Coprinopsis picacea (Bull.) Redhead, Vilgalys & Moncalvo

Synonyms
- Agaricus picaceus Bull. Coprinus picaceus (Bull.) Gray

= Coprinopsis picacea =

Species of fungus

Coprinopsis picacea
- Mycological characteristics
- Gills on hymenium
- Cap is conical
- Hymenium is free
- Stipe is bare
- Spore print is black
- Ecology is saprotrophic
- Edibility is poisonous

Coprinopsis picacea, commonly known as the magpie mushroom, magpie fungus, or magpie inkcap, is a species of fungus in the family Psathyrellaceae.

== Taxonomy ==
The species was first described in 1785 by French mycologist Jean Baptiste François Pierre Bulliard in 1785 as Agaricus picaceus.

== Description ==
The cap is initially egg-shaped, then opens up to a bell shape up to 8 centimetres (3 in) wide. The cap is serrated and colored white on very young mushrooms. It breaks open with increasing age, revealing the dark brown background which becomes black. Remnants of the white, grayish to cream-colored velum remain on the cap as flakes, giving the impression of woodpecker or magpie plumage. With age, the brim of the cap rolls up and dissolves. The lamellae are mostly free, very close and are initially white, then reddening. Eventually they melt, dripping and black, hence the name inkcap.

The stalk is whitish and 12–20 (–30) cm long and 6–15 mm thick. It is hollow and not very stable, slightly tapered towards the top and covered with scales or fine fibers. The flesh is whitish with a fibrous, watery consistency and sometimes has an unpleasant smell of moth powder. The taste is also unpleasant.

=== Microscopic features ===
The elliptical, dark brown spores are 14–18.5 × 10–13 μm in size. The cheilo- and pleuro-Zystiden are bubbles or bag-to tubular. They are up to 150 μm long and 50 μm wide.

=== Similar species ===
The species can sometimes be confused with the edible Coprinus comatus.

== Distribution ==
The magpie inkcap is common in Europe and Australia, but it also exists in North America, though it is uncommon. In Europe, the area extends from Great Britain and France in the west to Poland, Hungary and Romania in the east and south to Spain and the Balearic Islands, Italy and Greece and to Germany and Denmark in the north.

== Toxicity ==
The species is inedible and causes digestive upset, being regarded as poisonous to some people.

== See also ==
- List of Coprinopsis species
