= Max Britzelmayr =

German mycologist and lichenologist

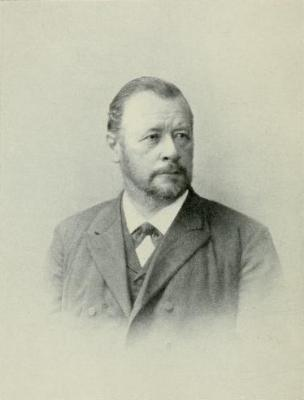
Max Britzelmayr (1839–1909)

Max Britzelmayr (7 January 1839 – 6 December 1909) was a German mycologist and lichenologist who was a native of Augsburg.

He spent his career as a schoolteacher and Kreisschulinspektor (school district administrator) in Augsburg. He is known for his research of a class of fungi known as Hymenomycetes. He also conducted investigations of lichens native to southern Bavaria, including the Allgäu Alps. In 1903 Britzelmayr started to issue exsiccata-like series, namely Lichenes exsiccati aus der Flora Augsburgs.

== List of Publications ==
- Dermini und Melanospori aus Südbayern, (Dermini and Melanspora of southern Bavaria); (1883)
- Hymenomyceten aus Südbayern, (Hymenomycetes of southern Bavaria); (1894)
- Zur Hymenomyceten-Kunde, (Study of Hymenomycetes); (1895)
- Materialien zur Beschreibung der Hymenomyceten, (Materials for the description of Hymenomycetes); (1897). Botanisches Zentralblatt 71: 49–59, 87–96.
- Die Lichenen der Allgäuer Alpen. (Lichens of the Allgäu Alps); (1900), Bericht der Naturwissenschaftlichen Vereins für Schwaben und Neuburg (A. V.) in Augsburg 34: 73–139.

== See also ==
- Category:Taxa named by Max Britzelmayr
