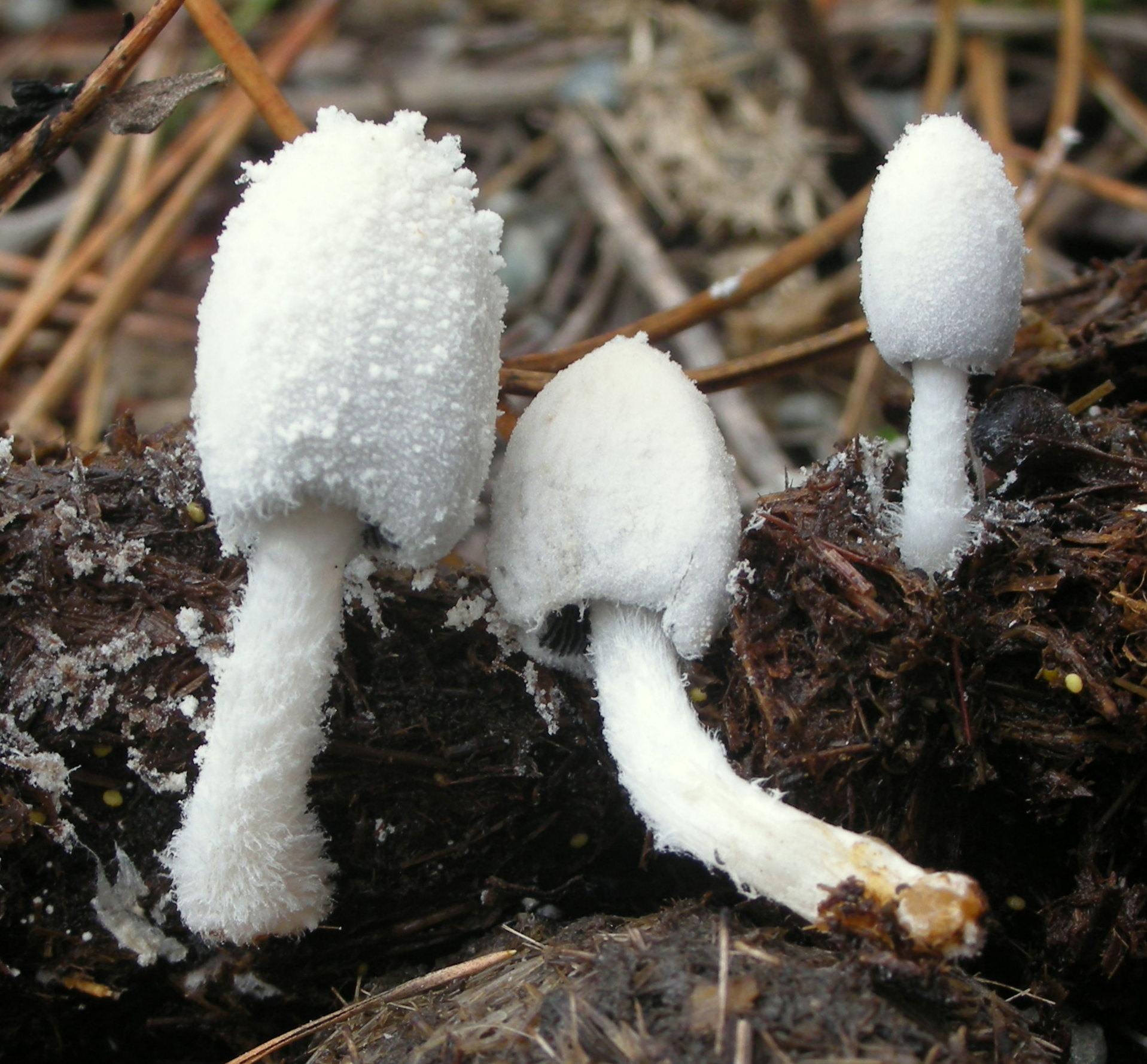

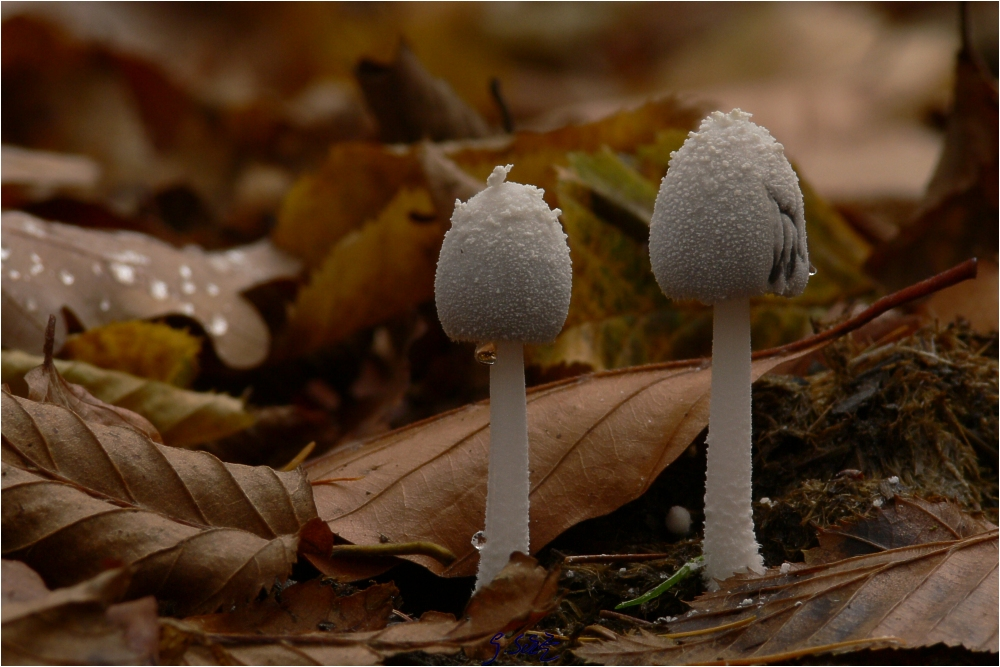

Scientific classification
- Kingdom: Fungi
- Division: Basidiomycota
- Class: Agaricomycetes
- Order: Agaricales
- Family: Psathyrellaceae
- Genus: Coprinopsis
- Species: C. nivea

Binomial name
- Coprinopsis nivea (Pers.) Redhead, Vilgalys & Moncalvo (2001)

Synonyms
- Agaricus niveus Pers. (1801); Coprinus niveus Fr. (1838); Coprinus latisporus P.D.Orton (1972); Coprinus niveus var. parvisporus Bogart (1975)

= Coprinopsis nivea =

Species of fungus

Coprinopsis nivea
- Mycological characteristics
- Gills on hymenium
- Cap is campanulate
- Hymenium is adnate
- Stipe is bare
- Spore print is black
- Ecology is saprotrophic
- Edibility is unknown

Coprinopsis nivea, commonly known as the snowy inky cap or snowy inkcap, is a species of mushroom producing fungus in the family Psathyrellaceae.

== Taxonomy ==
It was first described in 1801 by the German mycologist Christiaan Hendrik Persoon who classified it as Agaricus niveus.

In 1838 it was reclassified as Coprinus niveus by the Swedish mycologist Elias Magnus Fries.

In 2001 phylogentic analysis restructured the Coprinus genus and it was reclassified as Coprinopsis nivea by the mycologists Scott Alan Redhead, Rytas J. Vilgalys & Jean-Marc Moncalvo.

== Description ==
Coprinopsis nivea is a small inkcap mushroom which grows in wetland environments.

Cap: 1.5–3 cm. Starts egg shaped expanding to become campanulate (bell shaped). Covered in white powdery fragments of the veil when young. Gills: Start white before turning grey and ultimately black and deliquescing (dissolving into an ink-like black substance). Crowded and adnate or free. Stem: 3–9 cm long and 4-7mm in diameter. White with a very slightly bulbous base which may present with white tufts similar to that of the cap. Spore print: Black. Spores: Flattened ellipsoid and smooth with a germ pore. 15-19 x 8.5-10.5 μm. Taste: Indistinct. Smell: Indistinct.

== Etymology ==
The specific epithet nivea (originally niveus) is Latin for snowy or snow-covered. This is a reference to the powdery white appearance of this mushroom.

== Habitat and distribution ==
Grows in small trooping or tufting groups on old dung, especially that of cows and horses, Summer through late Autumn. Widespread and recorded quite regularly.

== Similar species ==
- Coprinopsis pseudonivea.
