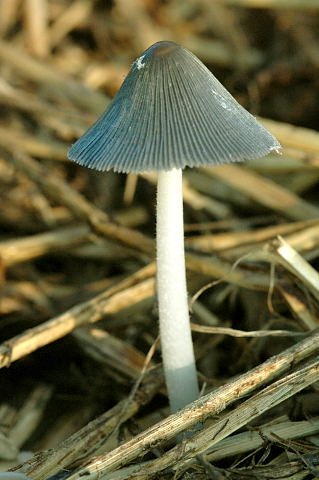

Scientific classification
- Kingdom: Fungi
- Division: Basidiomycota
- Class: Agaricomycetes
- Order: Agaricales
- Family: Psathyrellaceae
- Genus: Coprinopsis
- Species: C. cinerea

Binomial name
- Coprinopsis cinerea (Schaeff.) Redhead, Vilgalys & Moncalvo (2001)

Synonyms
- Agaricus cinereus Schaeff. (1774); Agaricus radians Batsch (1783); Agaricus macrorhizus Pers. (1796); Coprinus cinereus (Schaeff.) Gray (1821); Coprinus fimetarius var. cinereus (Schaeff.) Fr. (1838); Coprinus fimetarius var. macrorhizus (Pers.) Sacc. (1887); Coprinus macrorhizus (Pers.) Rea (1922); Coprinus delicatulus Apinis (1965); Hormographiella aspergillata Guarro, Gené & De Vroey (1992)

= Coprinopsis cinerea =

Species of fungus

Coprinopsis cinerea
- Mycological characteristics
- Gills on hymenium
- Cap is conical
- Hymenium is free
- Stipe is bare
- Spore print is black
- Ecology is saprotrophic
- Edibility is edible

Coprinopsis cinerea is a species of mushroom in the family Psathyrellaceae. Commonly known as the gray shag, it is edible, but must be used promptly after collecting.

Coprinopsis cinerea is an important model organism for studying fungal sex and mating types, mushroom development, and the evolution of multicellularity of fungi. The genome sequence was published in 2010. It is considered to be particularly suited organism to study meiosis, due to its synchronous meiotic development and prolonged prophase.

== Research ==
=== Antibiotics ===
Researchers in 2014 discovered a protein produced by Coprinopsis cinerea with antibiotic properties. The protein, known as copsin, has similar effects to other non-protein organically derived antibiotics. To date, it has not been determined whether antibiotic medicine for humans and other animals can be developed from this protein.

=== Culturing ===
Coprinopsis cinerea can be grown on complex (e.g. YMG, YMG/T) or minimal media (e.g. mKjalke medium), solid or liquid, with or without agitation, at 25 °C or optimally at 37 °C. It can be grown in dark or with 12-h light/12-h dark cycle.

=== Strains ===
- C. cinereus strain PG78 (A6B42, trp1.1;1.6, pab1) is an AmutBmut monokaryon, self-compatible strain, with trp- and pab-auxotrophic markers (requires tryptophan and p-aminobenzoate).

=== Genome ===
Coprinopsis cinerea strain Okayama 7 (#130) was sequenced with 10x coverage in 2003. A third and most recent revision of the sequence of strain Okayama 7 (#130) was released in 2010. Its haploid genome is ca. 37.5 Mb.

=== Molecular cloning ===
Coprinopsis cinerea can be transformed with exogenous DNA by transformation when the fungus is a protoplast. It was found that disrupting (knockout or RNAi silencing) ku70 homologue can increase gene targeting via increased homologous recombination. Either protoplasts derived from oidia or vegetative mycelium can be used, however, gene targeting was found to be higher by 2% (based on phenotyping) when using vegetative mycelium. Otherwise, insertion of integrative vectors ectopically and with small homologous regions can be used, likely with low transformation efficiency. Earlier, REMI (restriction enzyme-mediated integration) could be used to insert exogenous DNA into the chromosome to produce mutant strains. This relies on inserting exogenous DNA and restriction enzymes into the protoplast cell, allowing for the enzymes to cut the chromosome at specific sites which match those sites used to produce linearized plasmid DNA with the gene of interest; subsequently, host enzymes ligate the cut sites and thus produce integrated heterologous, exogenous DNA. Although successful, undesirable mutations are likely. Chemical mutagenesis (also random) can also be done. Phenotype selection of the inability to fruit can indicate that insertion led to disruption of vital genes. All in all, homologous recombination provides more specificity when creating a mutant strain. Depending on the mutant, auxotrophy markers (requires lost gene to be inserted) or prototrophy (when causing essential gene deletion) be used for selection.

=== Enzymes ===
Coprinopsis cinerea is known to produce laccase, a type of phenoloxidase. C. cinerea produces a variety of the same laccase, known as isoenzymes. Laccase activity can be measured by zymograms (in which a substrate for the enzyme is present in a separating gel). Under stressed conditions, temperature and medium, laccase secretion was increased. Although copper is required co-factor for laccase, merely adding copper did not induce laccase secretion. It was recently found that a TET (Ten-Eleven translocation dioxygenases) homologue, CcTET, was identified in C. cinerea, which may have important human (or mammalian) implications like cancer. DNA methylation is vital in humans and dysfunction is associated with cancer, thus, studying methylation reactions in non-mammalians may provide better insight into mammalian methylation reactions.

=== Reproduction ===
Coprinopsis cinerea can sense blue light. It was identified that gene Cc.wc-2 is involved in blue light photoreception. Etiolated stipes (elongation without cap maturation) is caused when grown without light.

=== Meiosis ===
Coprinopsis cinerea is an ideal model for studying meiosis because meiosis progresses synchronously in about 10 million cells within each mushroom cap. Meiosis is a specialized cell division process, occurring in diploid cells, in which a single round of DNA replication occurs, and is followed by two divisions to produce four haploid daughter nuclei. During meiosis homologous chromosomes pair with each other and undergo a DNA repair process in which DNA damage is removed and genetic information is recombined. Burns et al. studied the expression of genes involved in the 15-hour meiotic process encompassing time points prior to the haploid nuclear fusion that forms the diploid zygote to the final formation of the four haploid products. They compared expression of particular genes in C. cinerea to the expression of the comparable genes (orthologs) in two other species (Saccharomyces cerevisiae and Schizosaccharomyces pombe) from which C. cinerea had diverged in evolution 500 to 900 million years ago. They found that the expression of individual genes turned on or off at the same stage in C. cinerea as in the other two species. They also found that genes considered to be specifically involved in the meiotic process were more conserved in their expression pattern than non-meiotic genes. These findings indicate ancient conservation of the meiotic process.

== Human disease ==
Coprinopsis cinerea is harmless to human and animal health under normal conditions. However, the organism can cause opportunistic infections (mycoses) in immunocompromised patients, such as those who have undergone haematopoietic stem cell transplantation or are otherwise undergoing immunosuppression treatment. Most reported cases have been respiratory infections, but cases involving the heart, skin, brain or gut have been reported, and the infections may rapidly become systemic. Whilst exceptionally rare, Coprinopsis cinerea infection is difficult to treat and often fatal in this vulnerable patient group. The infection is caused by the mould-like asexual (non mushroom-forming) anamorph of Coprinopsis cinerea which used to be known as Hormographiella aspergillata, and may be described under this name in the clinical literature.

== See also ==
- List of Coprinopsis species
- Cospin
