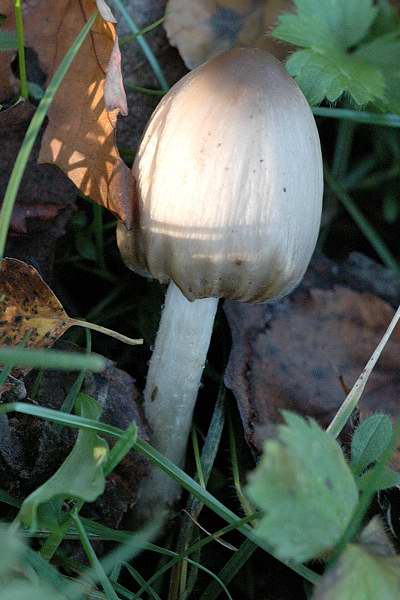

Scientific classification
- Domain: Eukaryota
- Kingdom: Fungi
- Division: Basidiomycota
- Class: Agaricomycetes
- Order: Agaricales
- Family: Psathyrellaceae
- Genus: Coprinopsis
- Species: C. acuminata

Binomial name
- Coprinopsis acuminata (Romagn.) Redhead, Vilgalys & Moncalvo (2001)

= Coprinopsis acuminata =

Species of fungus

Coprinopsis acuminata, commonly known as the humpback inkcap mushroom and earlier as Coprinus acuminatus, is a coprophilous fungus that grows on herbivore dung. It is heterothallic.

== Taxonomy ==
Coprinopsis acuminata was first described as Coprinus acuminatus in 1969 and later as Coprinopsis acuminata.
