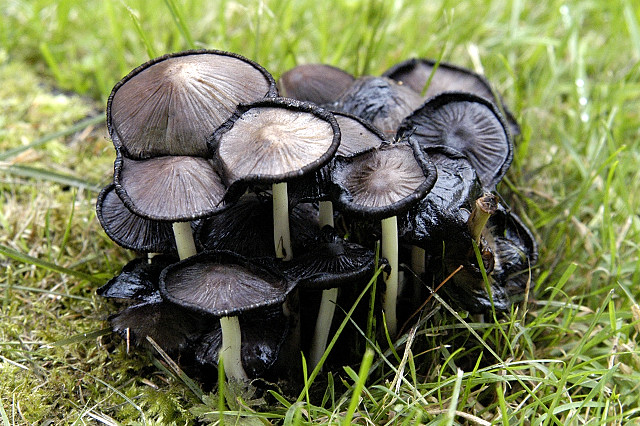
- Coprinopsis atramentaria

Scientific classification
- Kingdom: Fungi
- Division: Basidiomycota
- Class: Agaricomycetes
- Order: Agaricales
- Family: Psathyrellaceae
- Genus: Coprinopsis; P. Karst.

Type species
- Coprinopsis friesii (Quél.) P. Karst.

= Coprinopsis =

Genus of fungi

Coprinopsis is a genus of mushrooms in the family Psathyrellaceae. Coprinopsis was split out of the genus Coprinus based on molecular data. The species Coprinopsis cinerea is a model organism for mushroom-forming basidiomycota, and its genome has recently been sequenced completely.

== Taxonomy ==
The genus was described in 1881 by the Finnish mycologist Petter Adolf Karsten with the type species Coprinopsis friesii and C. phaeospora placed within it, both having formerly been classified as Coprinus species. Karsten stopped using the Coprinopsis genus name by 1889 and in 1887 it was considered a subgenus of Coprinus by Narcisse Théophile Patouillard.

The genus name Coprinopsis was revived in 2001 when phylogenetic analysis was used to classify and rearrange species within the Coprinus genus. Coprinopsis was considered to be an advantageous name to use for the genus due to using the same root word as Coprinus. Despite the name however many of these species are not associated with dung and the type species itself was described as growing from dry grass on the edge of woodland.

== Etymology ==
Coprinopsis derives from the Greek kóprinos meaning dung and the Greek suffix ópsis. This refers to the similarity to Coprinus species.

== Selected species ==
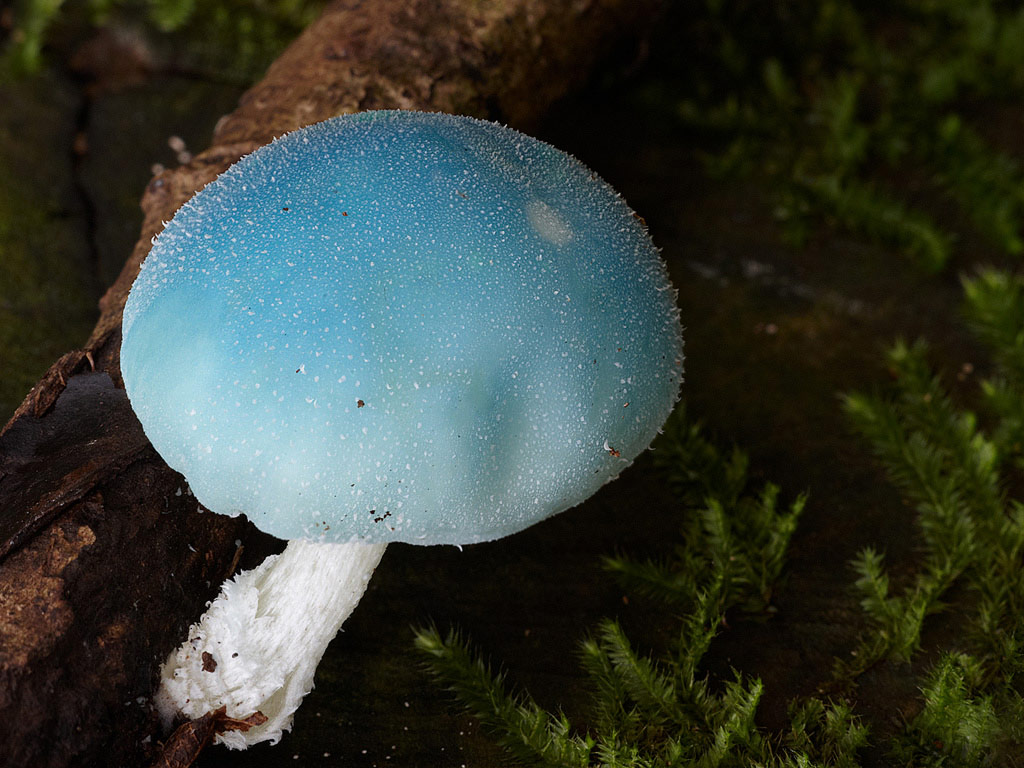
Coprinopsis pulchricaerulea - A species from Australia that was first described in 2022.

For complete list see List of Coprinopsis species

- Coprinopsis acuminata (humpback inkcap)
- Coprinopsis atramentaria (common inkcap)
- Coprinopsis episcopalis (mitre inkcap)
- Coprinopsis jonesii (bonfire inkcap)
- Coprinopsis lagopus (hare's foot inkcap)
- Coprinopsis nivea (snowy inkcap)
- Coprinopsis picacea (magpie inkcap)
- Coprinopsis variegata (the scaly ink cap or the feltscale inky cap)
