= Disulfiram-like drug =

Drug that causes an adverse reaction to alcohol

- Drug class
- Disulfiram, the prototypical drug of this class.

Class identifiers
- Synonyms: Alcohol sensitizers; alcohol-sensitizing agents; alcohol-deterrent drugs; acetaldehyde dehydrogenase inhibitors
- Use: Alcoholism
- Biological target: Acetaldehyde dehydrogenase, others

Legal status

A disulfiram-like drug is a drug that causes an adverse reaction to alcohol leading to nausea, vomiting, flushing, dizziness, throbbing headache, chest and abdominal discomfort, and general hangover-like symptoms among others. These effects are caused by accumulation of acetaldehyde, a major but toxic metabolite of alcohol formed by the enzyme alcohol dehydrogenase. The reaction has been variously termed a disulfiram-like reaction, alcohol intolerance, and acetaldehyde syndrome.

The prototypical drug of this group is disulfiram (brand name Antabuse), which acts as an acetaldehyde dehydrogenase inhibitor, preventing the metabolism of acetaldehyde into acetic acid, and is used in the treatment of alcoholism. A variety of other drugs cause disulfiram-like reactions upon consumption of alcohol as unintended drug interactions and side effects. Many disulfiram-like drugs act as inhibitors of acetaldehyde dehydrogenase similarly to disulfiram. However, some do not act via inhibition of this enzyme, and instead act via other, poorly elucidated mechanisms.

Unlike acetaldehyde dehydrogenase inhibitors and other disulfiram-like drugs, alcohol dehydrogenase inhibitors such as fomepizole (brand name Antizol) inhibit the metabolism of alcohol into acetaldehyde, thereby increasing and extending the effects of alcohol and reducing its toxicity. As such, they can be thought of as converses of disulfiram-like drugs. Fomepizole is used medically as an antidote against methanol and ethylene glycol poisoning.

== List of agents ==
=== Intended ===
Drugs which cause disulfiram-like reactions upon ingestion of alcohol as an intended effect include:

- Calcium carbimide
- Disulfiram
- Hydrogen cyanamide

=== Unintended ===
Drugs which cause disulfiram-like reactions upon ingestion of alcohol as an unintended effect include:

- Abacavir
- Cephalosporins, but only these with a methylthiotetrazole side chain or a methylthiodioxotriazine ring; thought to be due to common N-methylthiotetrazole metabolite, which is similar in structure to disulfiram. Such drugs include cefamandole, cefmenoxime, cefmetazole, cefonicid, cefoperazone, cefotetan, ceftriaxone, and latamoxef (moxalactam).
- Chloral hydrate
- Chloramphenicol
- Ethacrynic acid
- Griseofulvin (weak evidence)
- Hydrazines
  - Isoniazid: causes headache via a non-ALDH2 mechanism
  - Procarbazine
- Ketoconazole (weak evidence)
- Macrolide immunosuppressants such as pimecrolimus and tacrolimus
- Mepacrine (quinacrine)
- Nilutamide
- Nitrovasodilators (nitrates) such as nitroglycerin
- Nitroimidazoles such as benznidazole, metronidazole (disproven), ornidazole.
- Pargyline
- Phenacetin
- Phentolamine
- Phenylbutazone
- Propranolol
- Sulfiram
- Sulfonamides: sulfamethoxazole likely safe
- Sulfonylureas, specifically the first generation: chlorpropamide, glibenclamide (glyburide), and tolbutamide
- Tolazoline

A number of drugs do not cause disulfiram-like reactions, but have other unintended interactions with alcoholic drinks. For example, alcohol interferes with the efficacy of erythromycin. Patients on linezolid and tedizolid may be sensitive to the tyramine present in tap beers and red wine.

==== Antibiotics ====
Antibiotics such as metronidazole, tinidazole, cephamandole, latamoxef, cefoperazone, cefmenoxime, and furazolidone, cause a disulfiram-like chemical reaction with alcohol by inhibiting its breakdown by acetaldehyde dehydrogenase, which may result in vomiting, nausea, and shortness of breath. In addition, the efficacy of doxycycline and erythromycin succinate may be reduced by alcohol consumption. Other effects of alcohol on antibiotic activity include altered activity of the liver enzymes that break down the antibiotic compound.

=== Natural ===
Natural compounds and species which have been found to cause disulfiram-like reactions upon ingestion of alcohol include:

- Coprine, via active metabolite 1-aminocyclopropanol; found in mushrooms such as Ampulloclitocybe clavipes (club-footed clitocybe), Coprinopsis atramentaria (common inkcap), and Imperator torosus (brawny bolete) among others
- Kudzu (Pueraria lobata), conflicting evidence

== List of agents previously thought to cause disulfiram-like reactions ==
- Metronidazole
- Tinidazole and secnidazole.
- Cotrimoxazole (trimethoprim/sulfamethoxazole)
- Nitrofurantoin

== Dopaminergic neurotoxicity ==
Aldehyde dehydrogenase inhibitors may produce dopaminergic neurotoxicity or augment aging-related dopaminergic neurodegeneration by preventing the catabolism of the toxic dopamine metabolite 3,4-dihydroxyphenylacetaldehyde (DOPAL).

== See also ==
- Alcohol intolerance
