= Alcohol intolerance =

- Other names: Acute alcohol sensitivity
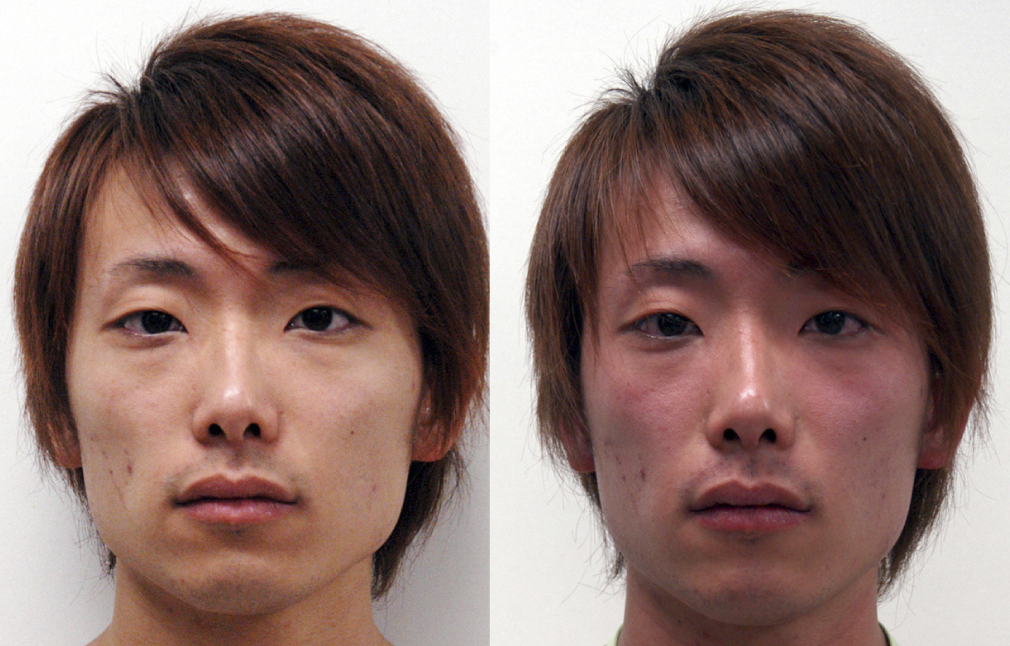
- Skin flushing, a common symptom of alcohol intolerance

Alcohol intolerance is due to a genetic polymorphism of the aldehyde dehydrogenase enzyme, which is responsible for the metabolism of acetaldehyde (produced from the metabolism of alcohol by alcohol dehydrogenase). This polymorphism is most often reported in patients of East Asian descent. Alcohol intolerance may also be an associated side effect of certain drugs such as disulfiram, metronidazole, or nilutamide. Skin flushing and nasal congestion are the most common symptoms of intolerance after alcohol ingestion. It may also be characterized as intolerance causing hangover symptoms similar to the "disulfiram-like reaction" of aldehyde dehydrogenase deficiency or chronic fatigue syndrome. Severe pain after drinking alcohol may indicate a more serious underlying condition.

Drinking alcohol in addition to consuming calcium cyanamide can cause permanent or long-lasting intolerance (nitrolime disease), contributing (in conjunction with other substances) to the accumulation of harmful acetaldehyde in the body by inhibiting the acetaldehyde dehydrogenase enzyme.

== Signs and symptoms ==
Individuals with alcohol intolerance will experience unpleasant reactions immediately after drinking alcohol. Common signs and symptoms of alcohol intolerance include nasal congestion, skin flushing (redness), headaches, low blood pressure, nausea, and vomiting.

== Causes ==
=== Genetics ===
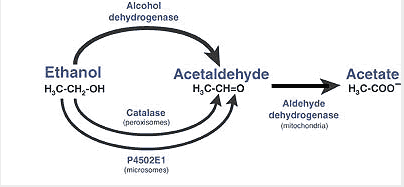
Alcohol metabolism

ALDH1 is an isozyme of aldehyde dehydrogenase. A structural mutation in the gene of ALDH1, commonly found in East Asians, results in low levels of functional ALDH1 enzyme and thus, higher blood acetaldehyde levels. Higher blood acetaldehyde levels have been associated with facial flushing caused by an increase in heart rate and blood flow to the face from vasodilation of the blood vessels. Individuals that have the ALDH2*2 allele, a variant that has a mutation when compared to the wild-type ALDH2 isozyme, are known to have higher blood acetaldehyde levels. Individuals that have either mutation in the ALDH1 or ALDH2 genes may have slightly different blood acetaldehyde levels among others carrying a similar mutation and may experience varying degrees of alcohol intolerance symptoms.

ALDH2	ALDH2 rs671

ALDH2 pictured on the left, is an enzyme which breaks down acetaldehyde. Regions highlighted in yellow are structural and allow ALDH2 to fold properly. The region highlighted in red can vary between individuals (right). Individuals who have a G in their DNA will have normal folding and function of ALDH2. Individuals who have an A in their DNA will have a misfolded ALDH2 which will impair their ability to metabolize alcohol. This is because the original amino acid (Glutamic acid) is positively charged and individuals with an A in their DNA will have an amino acid (Lysine) that is negatively charged causing repulsion and worse folding, inhibiting the enzyme's function.

=== Epigenetics ===
Epigenetic factors, which are heritable changes in gene expression that do not involve alterations to the DNA sequence, can play a significant role in the deficiency of aldehyde dehydrogenase 2 (ALDH2), a key enzyme in metabolizing alcohol. This deficiency contributes to alcohol intolerance by impairing the breakdown of acetaldehyde, a toxic intermediate produced during alcohol metabolism. One primary mechanism involves DNA methylation, a chemical modification where methyl groups are added to DNA, often at CpG sites (regions of DNA where a cytosine nucleotide is followed by a guanine nucleotide). Changes in DNA methylation at the ALDH2 gene's CpG sites can reduce enzyme activity. Lower methylation at these sites reduces ALDH2 production, intensifying alcohol intolerance symptoms like facial flushing, headaches, and rapid heartbeat.

Chronic alcohol exposure can itself cause epigenetic modifications, altering the expression of genes involved in alcohol metabolism, including ALDH2. Research shows that repeated alcohol intake can change DNA methylation across various genes, contributing to progressive alcohol sensitivity and amplifying the effects of genetic predispositions to alcohol intolerance. For individuals with ALDH2 deficiencies, these epigenetic changes can worsen the body's ability to break down acetaldehyde, resulting in more frequent or severe symptoms over time.

In addition to DNA methylation, other epigenetic mechanisms, such as histone modifications (chemical changes to the proteins that help package DNA) and non-coding RNAs (RNA molecules that regulate gene expression without encoding proteins), also influence ALDH2 regulation. These factors can alter chromatin structure, the organization of DNA and proteins within the nucleus, reducing gene accessibility and decreasing enzyme production. Combined with genetic predispositions, these epigenetic factors play a significant role in alcohol intolerance, as they contribute to inefficient alcohol metabolism and a buildup of acetaldehyde, resulting in the discomfort and adverse reactions experienced by affected individuals.

=== Risk factors ===
Various genetic and environmental factors exist that can lead to an increased risk for developing alcohol intolerance. Individuals with two copies of the ALDH2*2 allele are known to have high blood acetaldehyde levels and experience "hangover" symptoms such as heart palpitations for longer durations, even with low alcohol consumption. Individuals who work with DMF have shown a dose-related increase in alcohol intolerance complaints. Exposure to DMF can also cause facial flushing and increased sensitivity to alcohol.

=== Acquired causes ===
Tolerance of alcohol varies with continued use, as individuals with alcohol dependence over a longer period are known to have lower tolerance to alcohol than those with a shorter period of dependence. While no direct cause for this has been documented, one possibility is that due to impaired liver function, ADH and ALDH function poorer than they otherwise would. Chronic alcohol use is known to lead to liver pathologies, that being alcoholic liver disease, which leads to further liver conditions like FLD or steatosis, which is a buildup of fat in the liver, and cirrhosis, a buildup of scar tissue in the liver tissue. Because liver enzyme function is based on the relative function of liver cells (hepatocytes) liver disease caused by chronic alcohol use can lead to poor metabolism of alcohol over time, due to improper function of enzymes that would otherwise process alcohol.

== Diagnosis ==
=== Ethanol patch test ===
In an ethanol patch test, different concentrations of ethanol are applied onto lint pads and attached to the inner surface of the upper arm for several minutes. If skin redness occurs after 10–15 minutes, the individual is deemed to have a lack of ALDH1 associated with alcohol intolerance.

=== Difference from alcohol allergy ===
Alcohol intolerance is not an allergy. There are often misconceptions that alcohol intolerance and alcohol allergy are the same, but they are not. Alcohol intolerance is an inherited genetic disorder that impairs alcohol metabolism. The increased accumulation of acetaldehyde in affected individuals due to deficient aldehyde dehydrogenase enzymes often leads to the characteristic symptom of having flushed skin. On the other hand, the more uncommon alcohol allergy is an immune system reaction to alcohol (specifically ethanol) that causes symptoms such as rashes, difficulty breathing, and anaphylaxis in severe cases. Nausea is a symptom common to both alcohol intolerance and alcohol allergy. Remarkably, inhaled isopropyl alcohol can be used to provide nausea and vomiting relief.

Alcohol intolerance and alcohol allergy, while often confused due to their overlapping symptoms, have distinct biological mechanisms. Alcohol intolerance is mainly due to genetic variations that affect the enzyme aldehyde dehydrogenase 2 (ALDH2). Individuals with ALDH2 deficiency cannot metabolize acetaldehyde, a toxic byproduct of alcohol metabolism, effectively. In contrast, alcohol allergy involves the immune system mistakenly identifying alcohol or its components, such as sulfites (preservatives commonly used in alcoholic beverages to prevent spoilage) and histamines (chemical compounds naturally produced during fermentation that can trigger inflammatory responses), as harmful, thereby triggering an immune response. This can result in symptoms such as hives, difficulty breathing, and in severe cases, anaphylaxis.

Both conditions can present symptoms such as gastrointestinal distress and flushing. However, the timing and severity of these symptoms differ. Alcohol intolerance typically causes immediate reactions after drinking, while allergic reactions can vary widely in onset and severity based on individual sensitivities to allergens present in alcoholic beverages.

Understanding the distinctions between alcohol intolerance and alcohol allergy is crucial for proper alleviation of symptoms. Alcohol intolerance results from metabolic challenges related to enzyme function, while alcohol allergy involves the immune response. Recognizing these differences can help individuals avoid triggers and seek appropriate medical advice.

== Management ==
Avoiding or restricting alcohol is the most straightforward way to prevent the symptoms of alcohol intolerance. Tobacco use or exposure to secondhand smoke should be avoided, as smoking may increase levels of acetaldehyde. Certain medications may interact with alcohol and worsen symptoms. Antacid or antihistamines are used to reduce the symptoms of alcohol intolerance. However, these medications simply mask these symptoms. Reducing alcohol consumption lowers the risk for cancer and other serious diseases.

== See also ==
- Alcohol tolerance
- Disulfiram-alcohol reaction
- Disulfiram-like drug
- Alcoholic liver disease
