= DmpG-like communication domain =

InterPro Domain

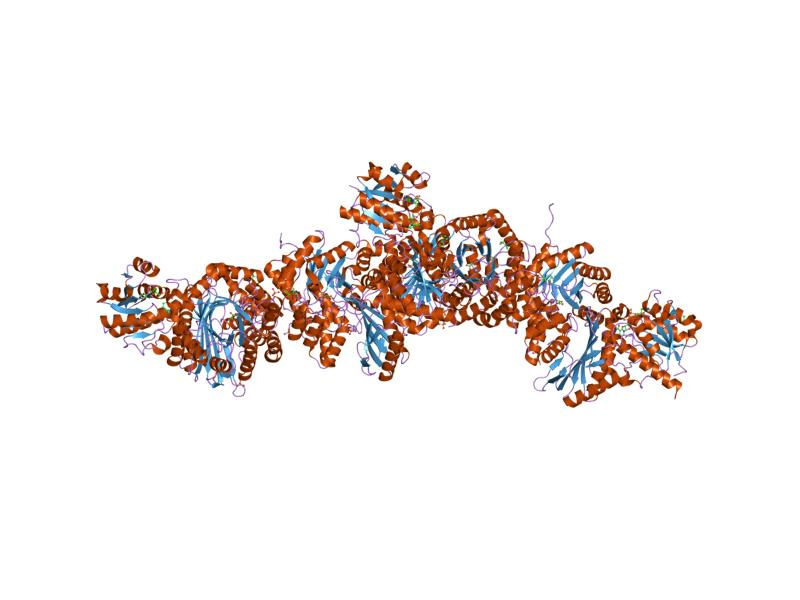
- crystal structure of a bifunctional aldolase-dehydrogenase : sequestering a reactive and volatile intermediate

Identifiers
- Symbol: DmpG_comm
- Pfam: PF07836
- InterPro: IPR012425
- SCOP2: 1nvm / SCOPe / SUPFAM
Available protein structures:
- Pfam: structures / ECOD
- PDB: RCSB PDB; PDBe; PDBj
- PDBsum: structure summary

In molecular biology, the DmpG-like communication domain is a protein domain found towards the C-terminal region of various aldolase enzymes. It consists of five alpha-helices, four of which form an antiparallel helical bundle that plugs the C terminus of the N-terminal TIM barrel domain. The communication domain is thought to play an important role in the heterodimerisation of the enzyme.

This domain heterodimerises with acetaldehyde dehydrogenases to form a bifunctional aldolase-dehydrogenase.
