= Disulfiram-alcohol reaction =

Medical condition

- Other names: Disulfiram ethanol reaction (DER), Antabuse effect, acetaldehyde syndrome
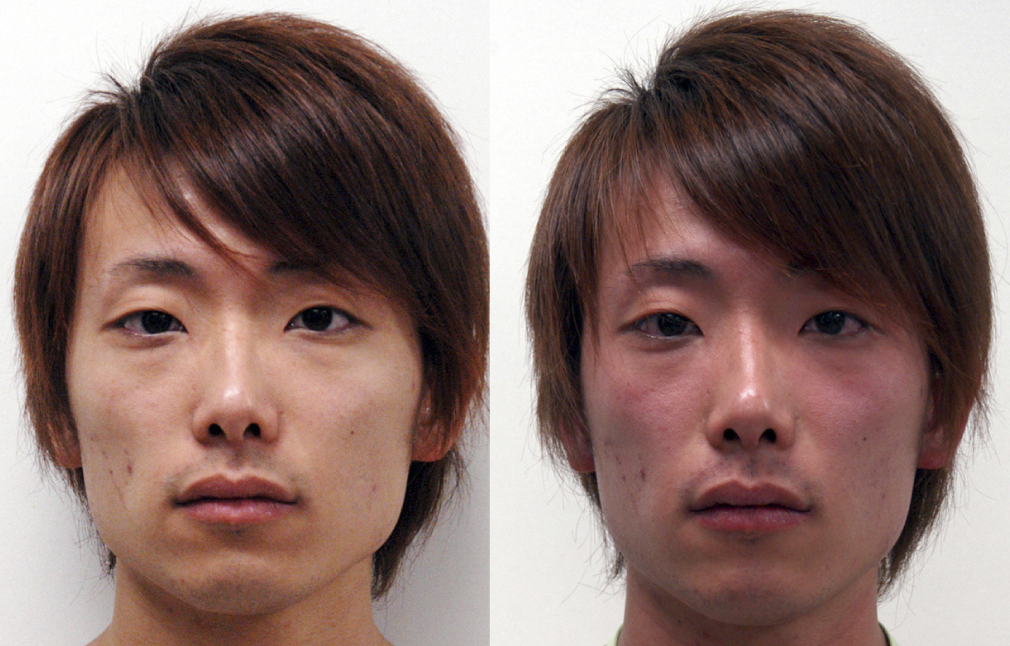
- Alcohol flush reaction is a visible effect of DAR.
- Specialty: Toxicology
- Symptoms: Flushing, nausea, lightheadedness, headache, sweating, vomiting, vertigo
- Causes: Ingestion of disulfiram with alcohol

Disulfiram-alcohol reaction (DAR) is the effect of the interaction in the human body of alcohol drunk with disulfiram or some types of mushrooms. The DAR is key to disulfiram therapy that is widely used for alcohol-aversive treatment and management of other addictions (e.g. cocaine use). Once disulfiram-treated patients take alcohol, even in small doses, they experience strong unpleasant sensations (flush, nausea, lightheadedness, headache, sweating, vomiting, and vertigo).

Disulfiram has been used to treat alcoholism since 1948 after its accidental discovery in Denmark.

== Pharmacology ==
DAR symptoms usually begin within 5–15 minutes of the ingestion of alcohol by a patient who has taken disulfiram 3–12 hours before.

Increased acetaldehyde content in blood is considered to be the cause of the toxic effect. Disulfiram inhibits several human aldehyde dehydrogenases (ALDH), most importantly the version coded for by gene ALDH2 which metabolizes acetaldehyde. The reaction is found to depend on a disulfiram-induced predisposition reflected by alkalosis, the blood acetaldehyde level, and an individual predisposition reflected by dopamine β-hydroxylase activity.

The intensity of a patient's experience of DAR varies with the ethnicity of the patient.

It has long been known that disulfiram can cause hepatitis and can be fatal (1 case per 30,000 patients), although due to dosage reductions in recent decades, such cases are extremely rare. Death, however, from the reaction itself without significant liver damage is also possible as an atypical case.

== Unintended initiations ==
DAR can occur from skin contact of a disulfiram-treated patient with alcohol-containing skin care products such as colognes, sunscreen lotions, aftershave lotions, and alcohol-based tar gels, but a significant toxic effect does not appear to be achieved in this way. During the COVID-19 pandemic, there were also cases of DAR initiation due to the use of alcohol-based hand sanitizers.

Some mushrooms contain substances that, when combined with alcohol, cause DAR. They include lurid bolete (Boletus luridus), inky cap (Coprinopsis atramentaria), and club-foot (Clitocybe clavipes). Because of the similarities to disulfiram (tetraethylthiuram disulfide) poisoning, it was long speculated that disulfiram was the active ingredient in common inkcap. In 1975, coprine was identified as the compound in the common inkcap, with the mechanism identified in 1979.

== See also ==
- Alcohol intolerance
- Disulfiram-like drug
- Mushroom poisoning
