= Calcium carbimide =

Chemical compound

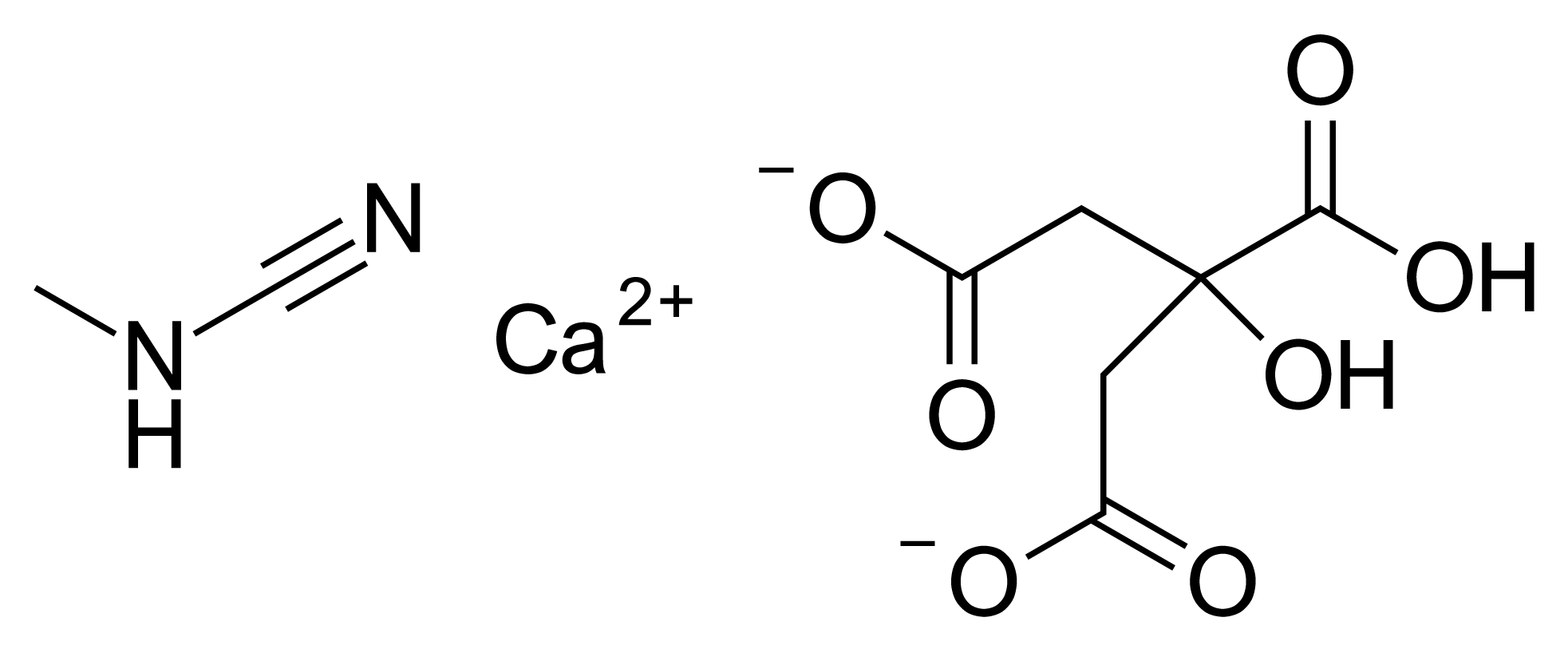

Clinical data
- AHFS/Drugs.com: International Drug Names
- ATC code: N07BB02 (WHO)

Identifiers
- IUPAC name: calcium 2-hydroxypropane-1,2,3-tricarboxylate; methylcyanamide
- CAS Number: 156-62-7; citrated: 8013-88-5
- PubChem CID: 6335910
- ChemSpider: 21106422
- UNII: ZLR270912W; citrated: 21ZCD2AA4H
- ChEMBL: ChEMBL2106095

Chemical and physical data
- Formula: C_{6}H_{6}O_{7}.C_{2}H_{4}N_{2}.Ca
- 3D model (JSmol): Interactive image
- SMILES: [Ca+2].O=C([O-])CC(O)(CC(=O)O)C([O-])=O.N#CNC
- InChI: InChI=1S/C6H8O7.C2H4N2.Ca/c7-3(8)1-6(13,5(11)12)2-4(9)10;1-4-2-3;/h13H,1-2H2,(H,7,8)(H,9,10)(H,11,12);4H,1H3;/q;;+2/p-2; Key:ZZOBQLACMMNMCT-UHFFFAOYSA-L

Calcium carbimide, sold as the citrate salt under the trade name Temposil, is a disulfiram-like medication. Its effects are similar to the medication disulfiram (Antabuse) in that it interferes with the normal metabolism of alcohol by preventing the breakdown of the metabolic byproduct acetaldehyde. The result is that when alcohol is consumed by users of calcium carbimide, they experience severe reactions which include symptoms such as sweating, difficulty breathing, rapid heartbeat, rash, nausea and vomiting, and headache.

A recent 9-year study found that incorporation of supervised carbimide and the similar medication, disulfiram, into a comprehensive treatment program resulted in an abstinence rate of over 50%.

Temposil was developed by Drs. Ken Ferguson and Gordon Bell, who tested the medication on themselves. It was patented in 1955 by the Alcoholism Research Foundation of Ontario.

== See also ==
- Acamprosate
- Disulfiram-alcohol reaction
