= Sulfiram =

Chemical compound

Clinical data
- AHFS/Drugs.com: International Drug Names
- Routes of administration: Topical
- ATCvet code: QS02QA02 (WHO)

Pharmacokinetic data
- Bioavailability: Very low
- Excretion: Renal, unchanged

Identifiers
- IUPAC name: N,N,N′,N′-tetraethyldicarbonotrithioic diamide
- CAS Number: 95-05-6
- PubChem CID: 7215
- ChemSpider: 6945
- UNII: 1XHL4Q8P7Y
- KEGG: D08545
- CompTox Dashboard (EPA): DTXSID5058222
- ECHA InfoCard: 100.002.171

Chemical and physical data
- Formula: C_{10}H_{20}N_{2}S_{3}
- Molar mass: 264.46 g·mol^{−1}

Sulfiram (INN) or monosulfiram, trade name Tetmosol, is an ectoparasiticide used in the treatment and prevention of scabies. It is usually sold as a solution or medicated soap, sometimes in combination with benzyl benzoate.

Sulfiram is now rarely used, but, as of 2015, is still available in Brazil, India, and South Africa (as monotherapy).

== Adverse effects ==
Dizziness, headache, fatigue and erythematous rash may occur. A single case of toxic epidermal necrolysis was reported in 1968.

Sulfiram is structurally related to disulfiram (Antabuse), and readily converts to disulfiram when exposed to light. Like disulfiram, it can produce an unpleasant reaction when consumed with alcohol.
