= Factoring =

Factoring can refer to the following:

- Factoring (finance), a form of commercial finance
- Factorization, the mathematical concept of splitting an object into multiple parts multiplied together
- Integer factorization, splitting a whole number into the product of smaller whole numbers
- Decomposition (computer science)
- A rule in resolution theorem proving, see Resolution (logic)#Factoring

== See also ==
- Code refactoring
- Factor (disambiguation)
