= Factor =

Factor (Latin, 'who/which acts') may refer to:

== Commerce ==
- Factor (agent), a person who acts for, notably a mercantile and colonial agent
- Factor (Scotland), a person or firm managing a Scottish estate
- Factors of production, such a factor is a resource used in the production of goods and services
- Factor, a brand of the meal-kit company HelloFresh
- Factor Bikes, a British bicycle manufacturer
- Risk factor, in finance, a source of systematic risk and return

== Science and technology ==
=== Biology ===
- Coagulation factors, substances essential for blood coagulation
- Environmental factor, any abiotic or biotic factor that affects life
- Enzyme, proteins that catalyze chemical reactions
- Factor B, and factor D, peptides involved in the alternate pathway of immune system complement activation
- Transcription factor, a protein that binds to specific DNA sequences

=== Computer science and information technology ===
- Factor (programming language), a concatenative stack-oriented programming language
- Factor (Unix), a utility for factoring an integer into its prime factors
- Factor, a substring, a subsequence of consecutive symbols in a string
- Authentication factor, a piece of information used to verify a person's identity for security purposes
- Decomposition (computer science), also known as factoring, the organization of computer code
- Enumerated type: a data type consisting of a set of named values, called factor in the R programming language

=== Other uses in science and technology ===
- Factor, in the design of experiments, a phenomenon presumed to affect an experiment
- Human factors, a profession that focuses on how people interact with products, tools, or procedures
- Sun protection factor, a unit describing reduction in transmitted ultraviolet light

== Mathematics ==
=== General mathematics ===
- Factor (arithmetic), either of two numbers involved in a multiplication
- Divisor, an integer which evenly divides a number without leaving a remainder
- Factorization, the decomposition of an object into a product of other objects
- Integer factorization, the process of breaking down a composite number into smaller non-trivial divisors
- A coefficient, a multiplicative factor in an expression, usually a number
- The act of forming a factor group or quotient ring in abstract algebra
- A von Neumann algebra, with a trivial center
- Factor (graph theory), a spanning sub graph
- Any finite contiguous sub-sequence of a word in combinatorics or of a word in group theory.

=== Statistics ===
- An independent categorical variable.
  - In experimental design, the factor is a category of treatments controlled by the experimenter.
- In factor analysis, the factors are unobserved underlying hidden variables that explain variability in a set of correlated variables.

== People ==
- Factor Chandelier, Canadian hip hop artist
- John Factor (1892–1984), British-American Prohibition-era gangster
- Max Factor Sr. (1872–1938), Polish-American businessman and cosmetician
  - Max Factor Jr. (1904–1996), son of the above, born Francis Factor

== Other uses ==
- Factor, Arecibo, Puerto Rico, a barrio
- Factor (chord), a member or component of a chord
- FACTOR, the Foundation to Assist Canadian Talent on Records
- The Factor, an April 2017 TV show on Fox News Channel

== See also ==
- Co-factor (disambiguation)
- Factoring (disambiguation)
