= Cefoperazone =

Antibiotic

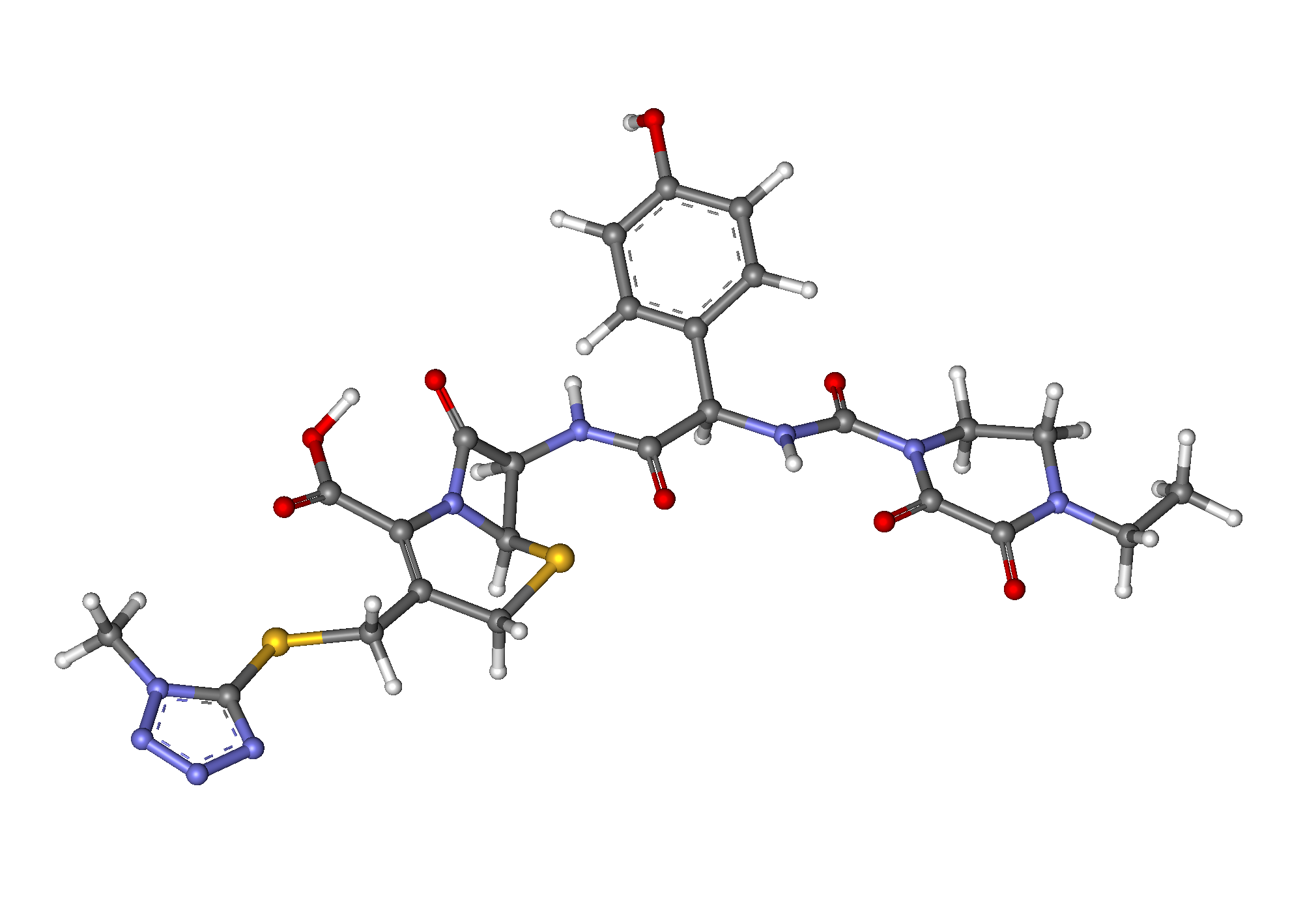

Clinical data
- AHFS/Drugs.com: Micromedex Detailed Consumer Information
- MedlinePlus: a601206
- ATC code: J01DD12 (WHO) QJ51DD12 (WHO)

Pharmacokinetic data
- Excretion: Hepatic

Identifiers
- IUPAC name: (6R,7R)-7-[(2R)-2-{[(4-Ethyl-2,3-dioxopiperazin-1-yl)carbonyl]amino}-2-(4-hydroxyphenyl)acetamido]-3-{[(1-methyl-1H-1,2,3,4-tetrazol-5-yl)sulfanyl]methyl}-8-oxo-5-thia-1-azabicyclo[4.2.0]oct-2-ene-2-carboxylic acid
- CAS Number: 62893-19-0
- PubChem CID: 44185
- DrugBank: DB01329
- ChemSpider: 40206
- UNII: 7U75I1278D
- KEGG: D07645
- ChEMBL: ChEMBL507674
- CompTox Dashboard (EPA): DTXSID2022759
- ECHA InfoCard: 100.057.936

Chemical and physical data
- Formula: C_{25}H_{27}N_{9}O_{8}S_{2}
- Molar mass: 645.67 g·mol^{−1}
- 3D model (JSmol): Interactive image
- SMILES: O=C2N1/C(=C(\CS[C@@H]1[C@@H]2NC(=O)[C@@H](c3ccc(O)cc3)NC(=O)N4C(=O)C(=O)N(CC)CC4)CSc5nnnn5C)C(=O)O
- InChI: InChI=1S/C25H27N9O8S2/c1-3-32-8-9-33(21(39)20(32)38)24(42)27-15(12-4-6-14(35)7-5-12)18(36)26-16-19(37)34-17(23(40)41)13(10-43-22(16)34)11-44-25-28-29-30-31(25)2/h4-7,15-16,22,35H,3,8-11H2,1-2H3,(H,26,36)(H,27,42)(H,40,41)/t15-,16-,22-/m1/s1; Key:GCFBRXLSHGKWDP-XCGNWRKASA-N

Cefoperazone is a third-generation cephalosporin antibiotic, marketed by Pfizer under the name Cefobid. It is one of few cephalosporin antibiotics effective in treating Pseudomonas bacterial infections which are otherwise resistant to these antibiotics.

It was patented in 1974 and approved for medical use in 1981. Cefoperazone/sulbactam (Sulperazon) is a co-formulation with sulbactam.

== Spectrum of bacterial susceptibility ==
Cefoperazone has a broad spectrum of activity and has been used to target bacteria responsible for causing infections of the respiratory and urinary tract, skin, and the female genital tract. The following represents MIC susceptibility data for a few medically significant microorganisms.

- Haemophilus influenzae: 0.12 - 0.25 μg/ml
- Staphylococcus aureus: 0.125 - 32 μg/ml
- Streptococcus pneumoniae: ≤0.007 - 1 μg/ml

== Adverse effects ==
Cefoperazone contains an N-methylthiotetrazole (NMTT or 1-MTT) side chain. As the antibiotic is broken down in the body, it releases free NMTT, which can cause hypoprothrombinemia (likely due to inhibition of the enzyme vitamin K epoxide reductase) and a reaction with ethanol similar to that produced by disulfiram (Antabuse effect), due to inhibition of aldehyde dehydrogenase.
