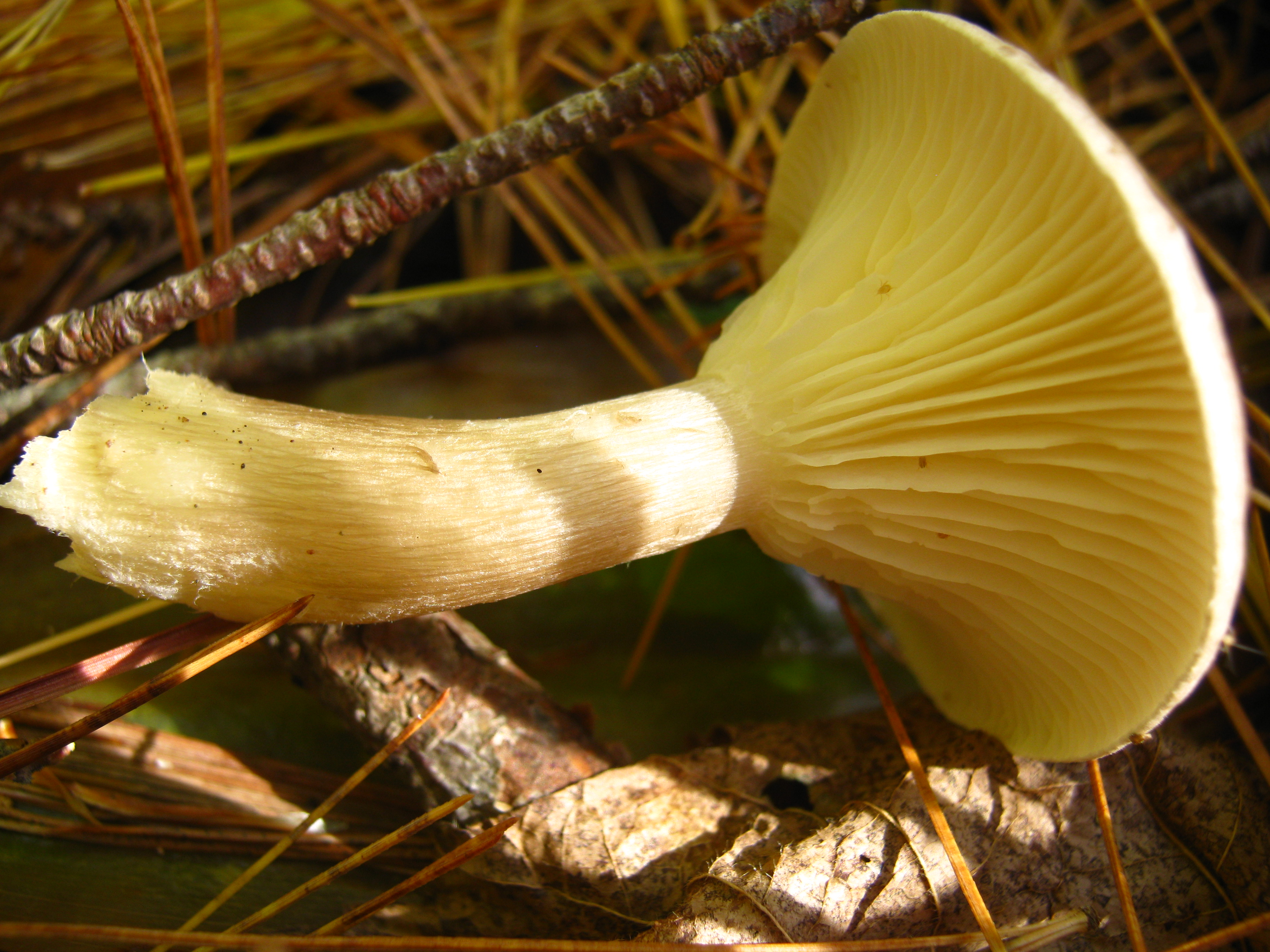
- Ampulloclitocybe clavipes

Scientific classification
- Domain: Eukaryota
- Kingdom: Fungi
- Division: Basidiomycota
- Class: Agaricomycetes
- Order: Agaricales
- Family: Hygrophoraceae
- Genus: Ampulloclitocybe; Redhead, Lutzoni, Moncalvo & Vilgalys (2002)

Type species
- Ampulloclitocybe clavipes (Pers.) Redhead, Lutzoni, Moncalvo & Vilgalys (2002)

Species
- A. avellaneialba A. clavipes A. squamulosoides

Synonyms
- Clavicybe Harmaja (2002)

= Ampulloclitocybe =

Genus of fungi

Ampulloclitocybe is a genus of three species of fungi with a widespread distribution.

== See also ==
- List of Agaricales genera
