= Mirivadelgat =

Investigational drug

Identifiers
- IUPAC name: [2-[4-(cyclopropylmethoxy)-3-[(3-fluoro-4-methoxyphenyl)methylcarbamoyl]phenyl]-3-pyridinyl]methyl (2S)-2-amino-3-methylbutanoate
- CAS Number: 1804941-96-5
- PubChem CID: 126646947
- ChemSpider: 133327633
- UNII: 22TB7Q431D

Chemical and physical data
- Formula: C_{30}H_{34}FN_{3}O_{5}
- Molar mass: 535.616 g·mol^{−1}
- 3D model (JSmol): Interactive image
- SMILES: CC(C)[C@@H](C(=O)OCC1=C(N=CC=C1)C2=CC(=C(C=C2)OCC3CC3)C(=O)NCC4=CC(=C(C=C4)OC)F)N
- InChI: InChI=InChI=1S/C30H34FN3O5/c1-18(2)27(32)30(36)39-17-22-5-4-12-33-28(22)21-9-11-25(38-16-19-6-7-19)23(14-21)29(35)34-15-20-8-10-26(37-3)24(31)13-20/h4-5,8-14,18-19,27H,6-7,15-17,32H2,1-3H3,(H,34,35)/t27-/m0/s1; Key:ONYMVJFFLSQCKA-MHZLTWQESA-N

Mirivadelgat is an investigational new drug that is being evaluated by Foresee Pharmaceuticals for the treatment of pulmonary arterial hypertension. It is an aldehyde dehydrogenase 2 activator.
