= Cefoperazone/sulbactam =

Antibiotic combination drug

Sulcefozone
Combination of
- Cefoperazone: β-Lactam antibiotic
- Sulbactam: β-Lactamase inhibitor

Clinical data
- Trade names: Sulcefozone
- Pregnancy category: C

Legal status
- Legal status: US: Discontinued; In general: ℞ (Prescription only)

Identifiers
- DrugBank: DB01329
- KEGG: D08772

Cefoperazone/sulbactam is a combination drug used as an antibiotic. It is effective for the treatment of urinary tract infections. It contains cefoperazone, a β-lactam antibiotic, and sulbactam, a β-lactamase inhibitor, which helps prevent bacteria from breaking down cefoperazone.
