= ATC code S02 =

ATC code S02 Otologicals is a therapeutic subgroup of the Anatomical Therapeutic Chemical Classification System, a system of alphanumeric codes developed by the World Health Organization (WHO) for the classification of drugs and other medical products. Subgroup S02 is part of the anatomical group S Sensory organs.

Codes for veterinary use (ATCvet codes) can be created by placing the letter Q in front of the human ATC code: for example, QS02. ATCvet codes without corresponding human ATC codes are cited with the leading Q in the following list.
National versions of the ATC classification may include additional codes not present in this list, which follows the WHO version.

== S02A Anti-infectives ==
=== S02AA Anti-infectives ===
S02AA01 Chloramphenicol
S02AA02 Nitrofural
S02AA03 Boric acid
S02AA04 Aluminium acetotartrate
S02AA05 Clioquinol
S02AA06 Hydrogen peroxide
S02AA07 Neomycin
S02AA08 Tetracycline
S02AA09 Chlorhexidine
S02AA10 Acetic acid
S02AA11 Polymyxin B
S02AA12 Rifamycin
S02AA13 Miconazole
S02AA14 Gentamicin
S02AA15 Ciprofloxacin
S02AA16 Ofloxacin
S02AA17 Fosfomycin
S02AA18 Cefmenoxime
S02AA30 Antiinfectives, combinations
QS02AA57 Neomycin, combinations

== S02B Corticosteroids ==
=== S02BA Corticosteroids ===
S02BA01 Hydrocortisone
S02BA03 Prednisolone
S02BA06 Dexamethasone
S02BA07 Betamethasone
S02BA08 Fluocinolone acetonide
QS02BA99 Corticosteroids, combinations

== S02C Corticosteroids and anti-infectives in combination ==
=== S02CA Corticosteroids and anti-infectives in combination ===
S02CA01 Prednisolone and antiinfectives
S02CA02 Flumetasone and antiinfectives
S02CA03 Hydrocortisone and antiinfectives
S02CA04 Triamcinolone and antiinfectives
S02CA05 Fluocinolone acetonide and antiinfectives
S02CA06 Dexamethasone and antiinfectives
S02CA07 Fludrocortisone and antiinfectives
QS02CA90 Betamethasone and antiinfectives
QS02CA91 Mometasone and antiinfectives

== S02D Other otologicals ==
=== S02DA Analgesics and anesthetics ===
S02DA01 Lidocaine
S02DA02 Cocaine
S02DA03 Phenazone
S02DA04 Cinchocaine
S02DA30 Combinations

== QS02Q Antiparasitics ==
=== QS02QA Antiparasitics ===
QS02QA01 Lindane
QS02QA02 Sulfiram
QS02QA03 Ivermectin
QS02QA51 Lindane, combinations
