= Aluminium acetotartrate =

Chemical compound

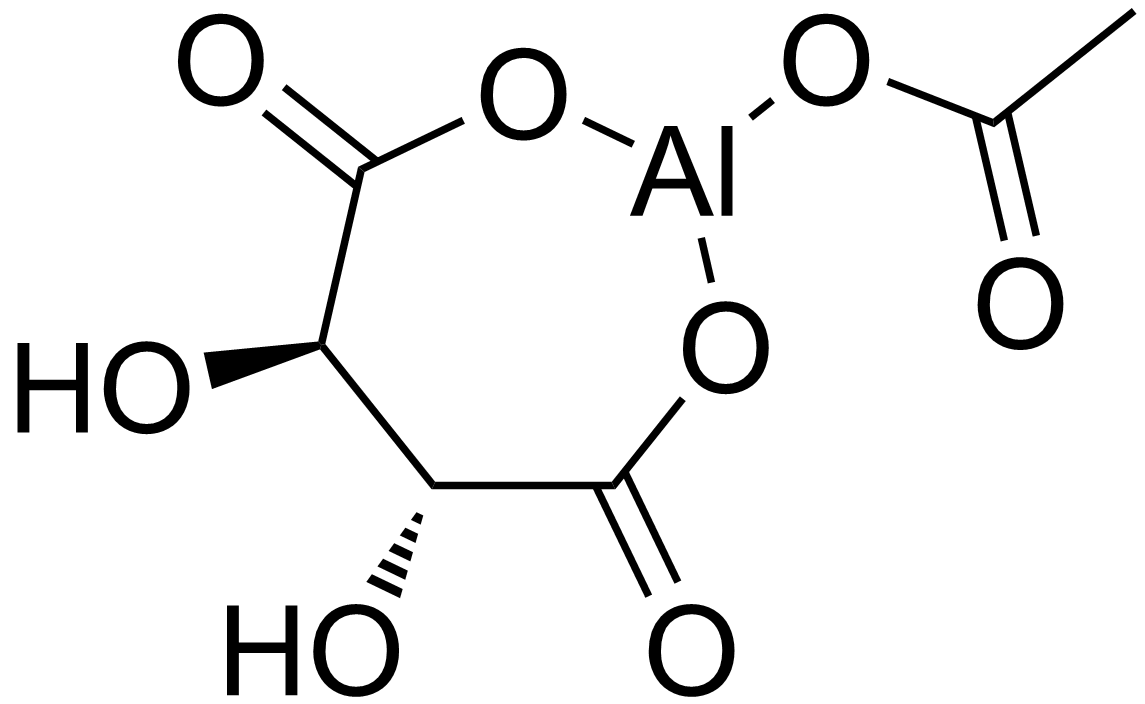

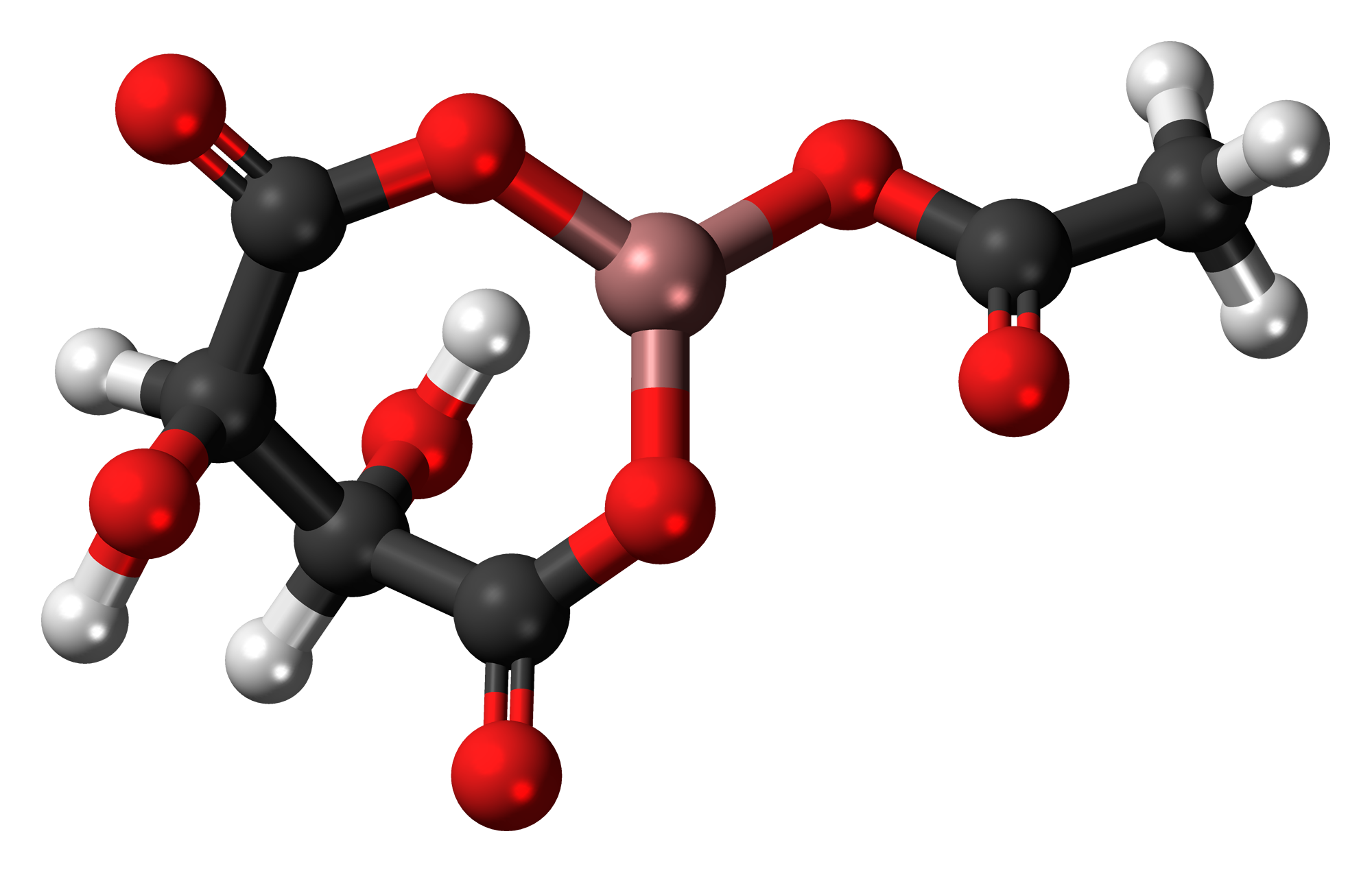

Clinical data
- Other names: Aluminium acetotartrate
- AHFS/Drugs.com: International Drug Names
- Routes of administration: Topical
- ATC code: S02AA04 (WHO) C05AX01 (WHO)

Identifiers
- IUPAC name: (acetato-κO) [2,3-dihydroxybutanedioato(2-)-κO1,κO4] aluminium
- CAS Number: 15930-12-8
- PubChem CID: 76968033
- DrugBank: DB13789
- ChemSpider: 32698959
- UNII: 19MLB4EQ88

Chemical and physical data
- Formula: C_{6}H_{7}AlO_{8}
- Molar mass: 234.096 g·mol^{−1}
- 3D model (JSmol): Interactive image
- SMILES: O=C(C)O[Al]0OC(=O)[C@H](O)[C@@H](O)C(=O)O0
- InChI: InChI=1S/C4H6O6.C2H4O2.Al/c5-1(3(7)8)2(6)4(9)10;1-2(3)4;/h1-2,5-6H,(H,7,8)(H,9,10);1H3,(H,3,4);/q;;+3/p-3/t1-,2-;;/m1../s1; Key:KQVRYPWCDUCYPZ-OLXYHTOASA-K

Aluminium acetotartrate (or ALSOL) is an organic acid, astringent, and disinfectant. It is the aluminium salt of acetic acid and tartaric acid.

== Appearance ==
Aluminium acetotartrate occurs as colorless or yellowish crystals, freely but exceedingly slowly soluble in water and insoluble in alcohol and ether.

== Applications ==
Aluminium acetotartrate is employed in 0.5–2% solutions as a nasal douche in affections of the respiratory tract, in 1–3% solutions as a substitute for solution of aluminium acetate, in concentrated solution as a lotion in frostbite and balanitis, and as a snuff with boric acid in atrophic rhinitis. It is also used as an antiseptic vulnerary ointment cream.
