= Alda-1 =

Organic compound

Identifiers
- IUPAC name: N-(1,3-Benzodioxol-5-ylmethyl)-2,6-dichlorobenzamide
- CAS Number: 349438-38-6
- PubChem CID: 831629
- ChemSpider: 726276
- ChEBI: CHEBI:94988
- ChEMBL: ChEMBL465952
- CompTox Dashboard (EPA): DTXSID801324445

Chemical and physical data
- Formula: C_{15}H_{11}Cl_{2}NO_{3}
- Molar mass: 324.16 g·mol^{−1}
- 3D model (JSmol): Interactive image
- SMILES: Clc1cccc(Cl)c1C(=O)NCc2cc3OCOc3cc2
- InChI: InChI=1S/C15H11Cl2NO3/c16-10-2-1-3-11(17)14(10)15(19)18-7-9-4-5-12-13(6-9)21-8-20-12/h1-6H,7-8H2,(H,18,19); Key:NMKJFZCBCIUYHI-UHFFFAOYSA-N

Alda-1 is an organic compound that enhances the enzymatic activity of human ALDH2. Alda-1 has been proposed as a potential treatment for the alcohol flush reaction experienced by people with genetically deficient ALDH2.

== Mechanism of action ==
Ethanol is metabolized to acetaldehyde in people, which is then metabolized to acetic acid primarily by ALDH2. People have various ALDH2 alleles. ALDH2*1 is a common allele (wild type), but about 40% of people of East Asian ethnicity have one or two copies of the dominant ALDH2*2 instead, which causes ALDH2 deficiency. If deficient people drink ethanol, they suffer from alcohol flush reaction due to acetaldehyde accumulation.

Four Alda-1 molecules bind to each monomer of ALDH2 tetramer. This enhances NAD^{+} binding to ALDH2. NAD^{+} is required by ALDH2 for its enzymatic activity, which is why Alda-1 increases ALDH2 activity by 2.1 fold if ALDH2 is coded by ALDH2*1 and by 11 fold if it is coded ALDH2*2.

== History ==
Chen et al. first reported Alda-1 in 2008. Alda-1 is the first known aldehyde dehydrogenase activator.
