= Disulfiram =

Chemical compound

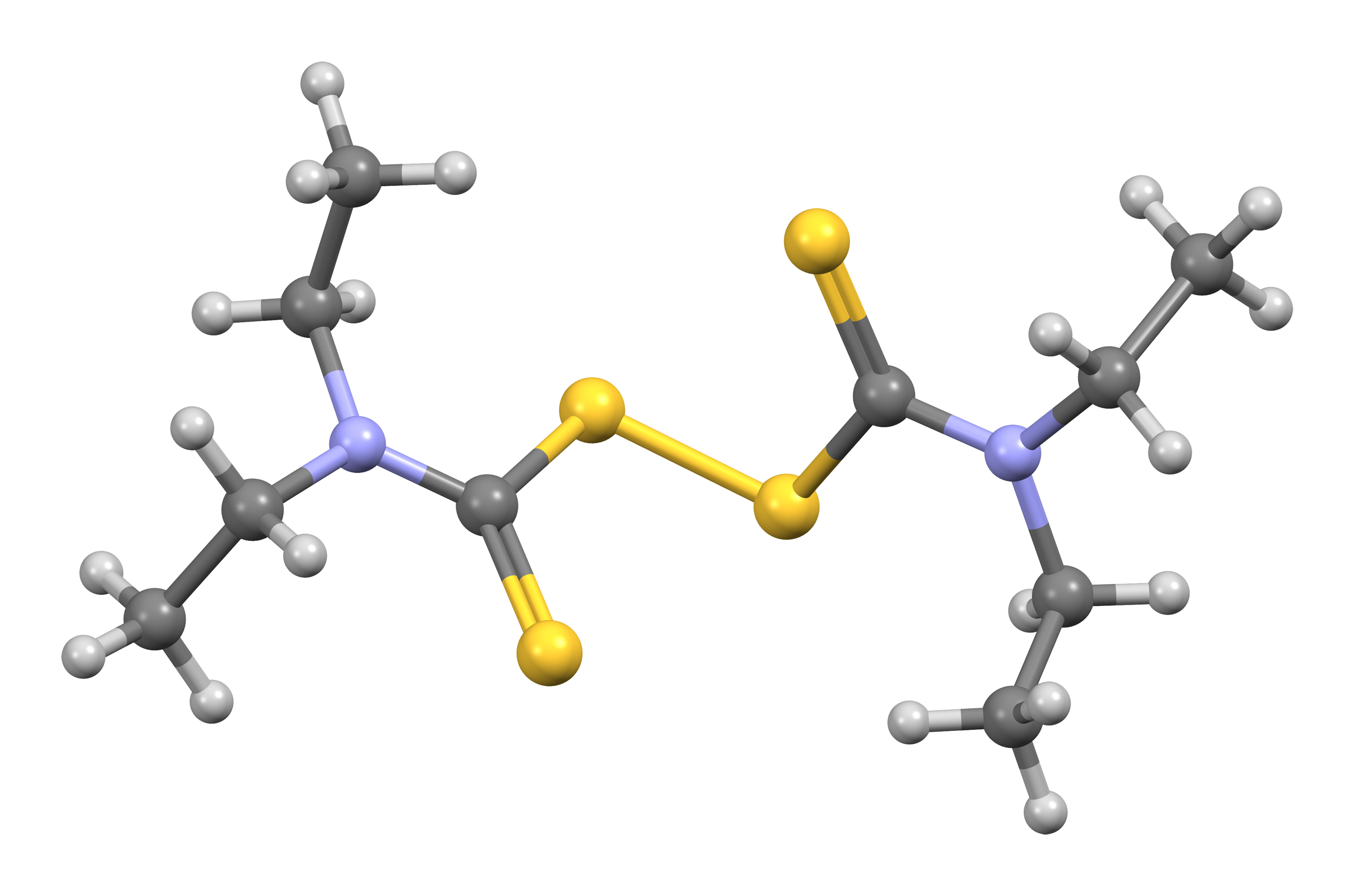

Clinical data
- Trade names: Antabuse, Antabus, other
- Other names: tetraethyldisulfanedicarbothioamide; 1-(Diethylthiocarbamoyldisulfanyl)-N,N-diethyl-methanethioamide
- AHFS/Drugs.com: Monograph
- MedlinePlus: a682602
- Pregnancy category: AU: B2
- Routes of administration: By mouth, subdermal implant
- Drug class: ALDH2 inhibitor, dopamine β-hydroxylase inhibitor, monoaminergic neurotoxin
- ATC code: N07BB01 (WHO) P03AA04 (WHO)

Legal status
- Legal status: AU: S6 (Poison) / S4; BR: Class C1 (Other controlled substances); UK: POM (Prescription only); US: ℞-only

Pharmacokinetic data
- Metabolism: In Liver to diethylthiocarbamate
- Elimination half-life: 7.3 +/-1.5 hours

Identifiers
- IUPAC name: 1,1′-disulfanediylbis(N,N-diethylmethanethioamide)
- CAS Number: 97-77-8
- PubChem CID: 3117
- IUPHAR/BPS: 7168
- DrugBank: DB00822
- ChemSpider: 3005
- UNII: TR3MLJ1UAI
- KEGG: D00131
- ChEBI: CHEBI:4659
- ChEMBL: ChEMBL964
- NIAID ChemDB: 010293
- CompTox Dashboard (EPA): DTXSID1021322
- ECHA InfoCard: 100.002.371

Chemical and physical data
- Formula: C_{10}H_{20}N_{2}S_{4}
- Molar mass: 296.52 g·mol^{−1}
- 3D model (JSmol): Interactive image
- SMILES: CCN(CC)C(=S)SSC(=S)N(CC)CC
- InChI: InChI=1S/C10H20N2S4/c1-5-11(6-2)9(13)15-16-10(14)12(7-3)8-4/h5-8H2,1-4H3; Key:AUZONCFQVSMFAP-UHFFFAOYSA-N

Disulfiram is a medication used to support the treatment of chronic alcoholism by producing an acute sensitivity to ethanol (drinking alcohol). Disulfiram works by inhibiting the enzyme aldehyde dehydrogenase (specifically ALDH2), causing many of the effects of a hangover to be felt immediately following alcohol consumption. Disulfiram plus alcohol, even small amounts, produces flushing, throbbing in the head and neck, a throbbing headache, respiratory difficulty, nausea, copious vomiting, sweating, thirst, chest pain, palpitation, shortness of breath, hyperventilation, fast heart rate, low blood pressure, fainting, marked uneasiness, weakness, vertigo, blurred vision, and confusion. In severe reactions there may be respiratory depression, cardiovascular collapse, abnormal heart rhythms, heart attack, acute congestive heart failure, unconsciousness, convulsions, and death.

In the body, alcohol is converted to acetaldehyde, which is then broken down by ALDH2. When the dehydrogenase enzyme is inhibited, acetaldehyde builds up, causing unpleasant side effects. The clinical use of disulfiram mimics the effects seen in individuals with ALDH2 deficiency. A common variation that causes deficiency is the ALDH2*2 allele, which affects an estimated 540 million people of East Asian ancestry. ALDH2 variants can be found in other ethnic groups, but they are less common. It is estimated that 120 million people of non-East Asian genetic ancestry have reduced ALDH2 enzymatic activity.

== Medical uses ==
Disulfiram is used as a second-line treatment, behind acamprosate and naltrexone, for alcohol dependence.

Under normal metabolism, alcohol is broken down in the liver by the enzyme alcohol dehydrogenase to acetaldehyde, which is then converted by the enzyme acetaldehyde dehydrogenase to a harmless acetic acid derivative (acetyl coenzyme A). Disulfiram (or rather, its metabolites, especially diethylthiomethylcarbamate) blocks this reaction at the intermediate stage by blocking acetaldehyde dehydrogenase. After alcohol intake under the influence of disulfiram, the concentration of acetaldehyde in the blood may be five to 10 times higher than that found during metabolism of the same amount of alcohol alone. As acetaldehyde is one of the major causes of the symptoms of a hangover, this produces immediate and severe negative reaction to alcohol intake. About 5 to 10 minutes after alcohol intake, the patient may experience the effects of a severe hangover for a period of 30 minutes up to several hours. Symptoms usually include flushing of the skin, accelerated heart rate, low blood pressure, nausea, and vomiting. Uncommon adverse events include shortness of breath, throbbing headache, visual disturbance, mental confusion, postural syncope, and circulatory collapse.

Disulfiram should not be taken if alcohol has been consumed in the last 12 hours. There is no tolerance to disulfiram: the longer it is taken, the stronger its effects. As disulfiram is absorbed slowly through the digestive tract and eliminated slowly by the body, the effects may last for up to two weeks after the initial intake; consequently, medical ethics dictate that patients must be fully informed about the disulfiram-alcohol reaction.

Disulfiram does not reduce alcohol cravings, so a major problem associated with this drug is extremely poor compliance. Methods to improve compliance include subdermal implants, which release the drug continuously over a period of up to 12 weeks, and supervised administration practices, for example, having the drug regularly administered by one's spouse.

Although disulfiram remained the most common pharmaceutical treatment of alcohol abuse until the end of the 20th century, today it is often replaced or accompanied with newer drugs, primarily the combination of naltrexone and acamprosate, which directly attempt to address physiological processes in the brain associated with alcohol abuse.

There is consistent evidence demonstrating disulfiram as an effective drug at inducing a restraint in addicts towards alcohol consumption. However the actionability and likelihood of improved outcomes for this drug is highly dependent on supervision and compliance. Modern day clinical centers make it a habit to follow guidelines that are densely infiltrated with making a clear distinction between unsupervised and supervised administration of drugs like disulfiram. Some meta analyses that discuss randomized controlled trials of disulfiram administration demonstrate that it has a very small effect on alcohol self-avoidance when the drug is taken voluntarily. On the contrary, when a supervisor is overviewing drug consumption, such as a spouse or pharmacist, the drug is in fact more effective than medications of the like, such as naltrexone, in being able to keep a person sober for a lengthy timeline.

== Side effects ==
The most common side effects in the absence of alcohol are headache, and a metallic or garlic taste in the mouth, though more severe side effects may occur. Tryptophol, a chemical compound that induces sleep in humans, is formed in the liver after disulfiram treatment. Less common side effects include decrease in libido, liver problems, skin rash, and nerve inflammation. Liver toxicity is an uncommon but potentially serious side effect, and risk groups e.g. those with already impaired liver function should be monitored closely. That said, the rate of disulfiram-induced hepatitis are estimated to be in between 1 per 25,000 to 1 in 30,000, and rarely the primary cause for treatment cessation.

Cases of disulfiram neurotoxicity have also occurred, causing extrapyramidal and other symptoms. Disulfiram can produce neuropathy in daily doses of less than the usually recommended 500 mg. Nerve biopsies showed axonal degeneration and the neuropathy is difficult to distinguish from that associated with ethanol abuse. Disulfiram neuropathy occurs after a variable latent period (mean 5 to 6 months) and progresses steadily. Slow improvement may occur when the drug's use is stopped; often there is complete recovery eventually.

Disulfiram disrupts metabolism of several other compounds, including paracetamol (acetaminophen), theophylline and caffeine. Disulfiram is a potent CYP2E1 inhibitor, explaining how it reduces the metabolism of several other medicines.

The clinical use of disulfiram mimics the genetic predisposition to alcohol intolerance that is found in East Asian populations due to the mutation of the ALDH2 gene.

There is already established safety history of Disulfram with regard to creating a picture concerning its use in studying the treatment of cocaine and alcohol abuse disorders, but it is important to consider that there are a number of adverse events which are relatively rare, but still possible and may contribute to its use and are mentioned in some clinical studies. According to information obtained from pharmacovigilance data reports of the FDA Adverse Events Reporting System (FAERS), disulfiram causes some adverse effects including those which are the most common – namely, sleepiness with the development of a characteristic metallic taste. However, there might be other serious adverse events developing from its use such as hepatitis. Disulfram-induced hepatitis occurs rarely, with an incidence rate of 1 per 25,000 patient-years. Bringing such information to light helps to understand what is going on in terms of its safety concerns better. Hence, it is crucially important to provide this type of statistical information in order to balance its perceived risks with benefits.

== Similarly acting substances ==
In medicine, the term "disulfiram effect" refers to an adverse effect of a particular medication in causing an unpleasant hypersensitivity to alcohol, similar to the effect caused by disulfiram administration.

Examples:

- Antibiotics (nitroimidazoles), e.g., metronidazole
- First-generation sulfonylureas, e.g., tolbutamide and chlorpropamide
- Several cephalosporin drugs, including cefoperazone, cefamandole and cefotetan, that have a N-methylthio-tetrazole moiety
- Griseofulvin, an oral antifungal drug
- Procarbazine
- Temposil, or citrated calcium carbimide, has the same function as disulfiram, but is weaker and safer.
- Coprine, which metabolizes to 1-aminocyclopropanol, a chemical having the same metabolic effects as disulfiram. It occurs naturally in the otherwise edible common ink cap mushroom (Coprinopsis atramentaria), hence its colloquial name "tippler's bane". Similar reactions have been recorded with Clitocybe clavipes and Suillellus luridus, although the agent in those species is unknown.

== Chemistry ==
Disulfiram is tetraethylthiuram disulfide, one of several thiuram disulfides. The related tetramethylthiuram disulfide - thiram - is a commercial fungicide. These are organosulfur compounds. Disulfiram is prepared by oxidation of sodium diethyldithiocarbamate:

2 (C_{2}H_{5})_{2}NCS_{2}Na + H_{2}O_{2} → (C_{2}H_{5})_{2}NC(S)−S_{2}−C(S)N(C_{2}H_{5})_{2} + 2 NaOH

It is soluble in polar organic solvents, but poorly soluble in water. It easily releases sulfur to give the corresponding thiuram sulfide:

(C_{2}H_{5})_{2}NC(S)−S_{2}−C(S)N(C_{2}H_{5})_{2} → (C_{2}H_{5})_{2}NC(S)−S−C(S)N(C_{2}H_{5})_{2} + S

Around 1900, it was introduced to the industrial process of sulfur vulcanization of rubber and became widely used, which led to the accidental discovery of its medical use through rubber factory workers developing a severe alcohol intolerance after being exposed to disulfiram on the job.

=== Pharmacodynamics ===
Disulfiram, or more precisely, its metabolites, especially diethylthiomethylcarbamate, acts as an irreversible aldehyde dehydrogenase (ALDH) inhibitor. ALDH is an enzyme that catalyze the oxidation of aldehydes. It is known to inactivate acetaldehyde, a toxic metabolite of alcohol. By inhibiting ALDH, disulfiram prevents the inactivation and detoxification of acetaldehyde and thereby induces a variety of unpleasant symptoms when alcohol is consumed.

Besides inhibiting ALDH, disulfiram is a dopamine β-hydroxylase (DBH) inhibitor. DBH is an enzyme that converts the monoamine neurotransmitter dopamine into norepinephrine. By inhibiting DBH, disulfiram may increase dopamine levels in the brain and periphery but decrease levels of norepinephrine and its metabolite epinephrine in the brain and periphery. However, it is also possible that disulfiram may actually decrease brain dopamine levels. DBH inhibition by disulfiram may explain its possible therapeutic benefits in cocaine dependence as well as cases of psychosis and mania associated with the drug. There are also cases of disulfiram producing stimulant psychosis in combination with the psychostimulants methylphenidate and amphetamine. DBH inhibition by disulfiram might also explain the hypotension side effect when alcohol is ingested in people taking disulfiram.

These secondary mechanisms are important to emphasize, as it sets a clear understanding for its investigation in treating cocaine use disorder as well. When catecholamine levels are manipulated, they reduce the reward that comes from ingestion of cocaine, thereby reducing the risk of relapse in some people. This reward dissociative chemical maneuvering is one of the ways disulfiram is a flexible drug.

Disulfiram is also known to inhibit the cytochrome P450 enzymes CYP2E1 and CYP1A2.

== History ==
In 1937, a plant physician in the American rubber industry described adverse reactions to alcohol in workers exposed to tetramethylthiuram monosulfide and disulfide. This observation led to the proposal that disulfiram and related compounds might lead to "the cure for alcoholism". The effect was also noticed in workers at a Swedish rubber boot factory.

In the early 1940s it had been tested as a treatment for scabies, a parasitic skin infection, as well as intestinal worms.

Around that time, during the German occupation of Denmark, Erik Jacobsen and Jens Hald at the Danish drug company Medicinalco investigated the use of disulfiram to treat intestinal parasites. The company had a group of enthusiastic self-experimenters that called itself the "Death Battalion", and in the course of testing the drug on themselves, accidentally discovered that drinking alcohol while the drug was still in their bodies made them mildly sick.

After the war, interest resumed. That work included small clinical trials with Oluf Martensen-Larsen, a doctor who worked with alcoholics. They published their work starting in 1948.

The chemists at Medicinalco discovered a new form of disulfiram while trying to purify a batch that had been contaminated with copper. This form turned out to have better pharmacological properties, and the company patented it and used that form for the product that was introduced as Antabus (later anglicized to Antabuse).

This work led to renewed study of the human metabolism of ethanol. It was already known that ethanol was mostly metabolized in the liver, with it being converted first to acetaldehyde and then acetaldehyde to acetic acid and carbon dioxide, but the enzymes involved were not known. By 1950 the work led to the knowledge that ethanol is oxidized to acetaldehyde by alcohol dehydrogenase and acetaldehyde is oxidized to acetic acid by aldehyde dehydrogenase (ALDH), and that disulfiram works by inhibiting ALDH, leading to a buildup of acetaldehyde, which is what causes the negative effects in the body.

The drug was first marketed in Denmark and as of 2008, Denmark is the country where it is most widely prescribed. It was approved by the FDA in 1951. The FDA later approved other drugs for treatment of alcoholism, namely naltrexone in 1994 and acamprosate in 2004.

== Society and culture ==
Though the Occupational Safety and Health Administration (OSHA) in the US has not set a permissible exposure limit (PEL) for disulfiram in the workplace, the National Institute for Occupational Safety and Health has set a recommended exposure limit (REL) of 2 mg/m^{3} and recommended that workers avoid concurrent exposure to ethylene dibromide.

== Research ==
Disulfiram has been studied as a possible treatment for cancer, parasitic infections, anxiety disorder, obesity and latent HIV infection.

=== Cancer ===
When disulfiram creates complexes with metals (dithiocarbamate complexes), it is a proteasome inhibitor and as of 2016 it had been studied in in vitro experiments, model animals, and small clinical trials as a possible treatment for liver metastasis, metastatic melanoma, glioblastoma, non-small cell lung cancer, and prostate cancer. An additional mechanism cannot be excluded, as disulfiram has also been reported to stabilize microtubules, thereby acting as a microtubule-targeting agent (MTA).

Disulfiram is under major consideration for oncological applications as an example of drug repositioning because of its potential as a proteasome inhibitor that's dependent on the presence of copper ions. Disulfiram, under the co-factor copper ions (Cu2+), undergoes metabolism into diethyldithiocarbamate (DDC), which forms Cu(DDC)2 complexes. These Cu(DDC)2 complexes are thought to affect cancer stem cells by inhibiting a protein called NPL4, which ends up in protein aggregation and apoptosis (cellular suicide). Clinical trials are already evaluating the efficacy of disulfiram combined with copper supplements as a treatment for glioblastoma and metastatic breast cancer.

=== Parasitic infections ===
In the body, disulfiram is metabolized to diethyldithiocarbamate (ditiocarb), which binds to metal ions such as zinc or copper to form zinc or copper diethyldithiocarbamate (zinc or copper ditiocarb). The zinc diethyldithiocarbamate (zinc-ditiocarb) metabolite of disulfiram is extremely potent against the diarrhea and liver abscess-causing parasite Entamoeba histolytica and might be active against other deadly parasites.

=== HIV ===
Disulfiram has also been identified by systematic high-throughput screening as a potential HIV latency reversing agent (LRA). Reactivation of latent HIV infection in patients is part of an investigational strategy known as "shock and kill" which may be able to reduce or eliminate the HIV reservoir. Recent phase II dose-escalation studies in patients with HIV who are controlled on antiretroviral therapy have observed an increase in cell-associated unspliced HIV RNA with increasing exposure to disulfiram and its metabolites. Disulfiram is also being investigated in combination with vorinostat, another investigational latency-reversing agent, to treat HIV.
