= 4-hydroxy-2-oxovalerate aldolase =

InterPro Family

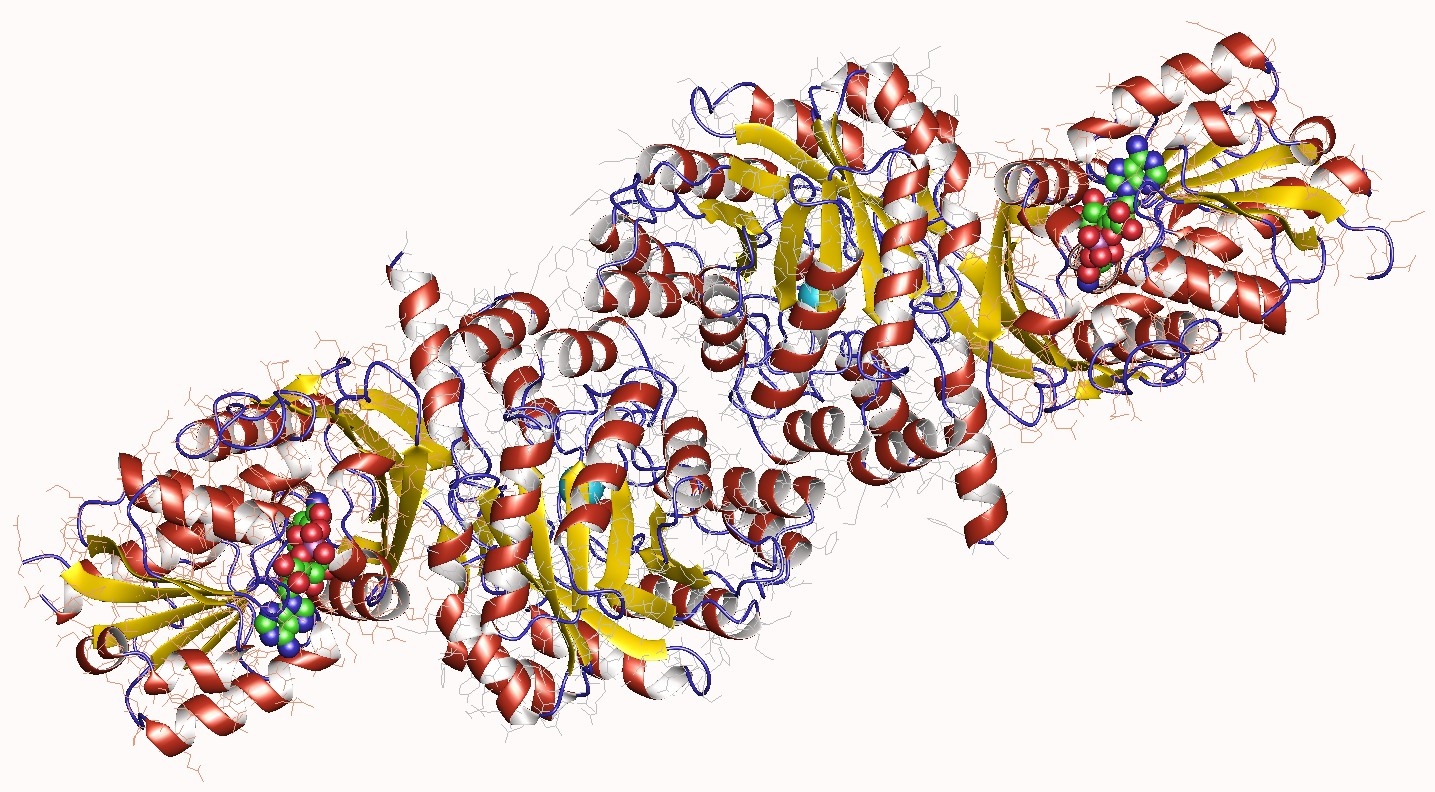
- 4-Hydroxy-2-oxovalerate aldolase heterotetramer (bifunctional), Pseudomonas

Identifiers
- EC no.: 4.1.3.39

Databases
- IntEnz: IntEnz view
- BRENDA: BRENDA entry
- ExPASy: NiceZyme view
- KEGG: KEGG entry
- MetaCyc: metabolic pathway
- PRIAM: profile
- PDB structures: RCSB PDB PDBe PDBsum
Search
- PMC: articles
- PubMed: articles
- NCBI: proteins

The enzyme 4-hydroxy-2-oxovalerate aldolase (EC 4.1.3.39) catalyzes the chemical reaction

4-hydroxy-2-oxopentanoate $\rightleftharpoons$ acetaldehyde + pyruvate

Baker et al. showed that BphI, a member of this family from Burkholderia xenovorans LB400 was able to utilize 4-hydroxy- 2-oxohexanoate (HOHA) with equal catalytic efficiency as 4-hydroxy-2-oxopentanoate, producing propionaldehyde + pyruvate. Furthermore, the enzyme was also able to catalyze the cleavage of 4-hydroxy-2-oxoheptanoate (HOHEP), forming butyraldehyde + pyruvate. Baker et al. we also able to show that acetaldehyde and propionaldehyde are not released into the bulk solvent, but are channeled to an associated acetaldehyde dehydrogenase known as BphJ. This is the first demonstration of substrate channeling in this family of enzymes.

This enzyme belongs to the family of lyases, specifically the oxo-acid-lyases, which cleave carbon-carbon bonds. The systematic name of this enzyme class is 4-hydroxy-2-oxopentanoate pyruvate-lyase (acetaldehyde-forming). Other names in common use include 4-hydroxy-2-ketovalerate aldolase, HOA, DmpG, BphI, 4-hydroxy-2-oxovalerate pyruvate-lyase, and 4-hydroxy-2-oxopentanoate pyruvate-lyase. This enzyme participates in 8 metabolic pathways: phenylalanine metabolism, benzoate degradation via hydroxylation, biphenyl degradation, toluene and xylene degradation, 1,4-dichlorobenzene degradation, fluorene degradation, carbazole degradation, and styrene degradation.
