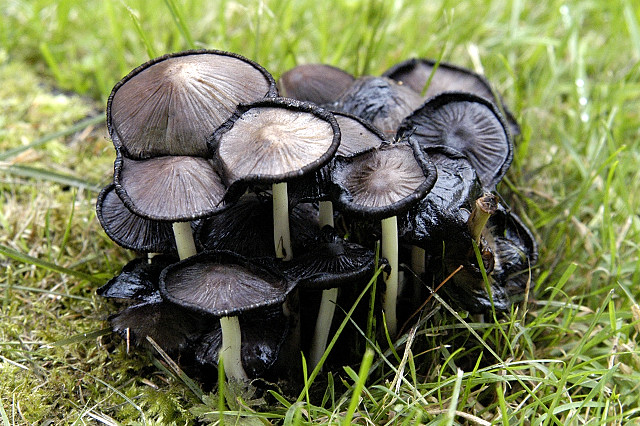

Conservation status
- Secure (NatureServe)

Scientific classification
- Kingdom: Fungi
- Division: Basidiomycota
- Class: Agaricomycetes
- Order: Agaricales
- Family: Psathyrellaceae
- Genus: Coprinopsis
- Species: C. atramentaria

Binomial name
- Coprinopsis atramentaria (Bull.) Redhead, Vilgalys & Moncalvo (2001)

Synonyms
- Coprinus atramentarius

= Coprinopsis atramentaria =

Species of fungus

Coprinopsis atramentaria
- Mycological characteristics
- Gills on hymenium
- Cap is ovate
- Hymenium is free
- Stipe is bare
- Spore print is blackish-brown
- Ecology is saprotrophic
- Edibility is edible or poisonous

Coprinopsis atramentaria, commonly known as the alcohol inky cap, common ink cap, tippler's bane, or inky cap, is a species of fungus. It is the second best-known ink cap after Coprinus comatus, its former congener. The grey-brown cap is initially bell-shaped before opening, after which it flattens and disintegrates. The flesh is thin and the taste mild.

It is a widespread and common throughout the Northern Hemisphere. Clumps of mushrooms arise after rain from spring to autumn, commonly in urban and disturbed habitats such as vacant lots and lawns, as well as grassy areas. It can be eaten, but due to the presence of coprine within the mushroom, it is poisonous when consumed with alcohol, as it heightens the body's sensitivity to ethanol in a similar manner to the anti-alcoholism drug disulfiram.

== Taxonomy ==
The common ink cap was first described by French naturalist Pierre Bulliard in 1786 as Agaricus atramentarius before being placed in the large genus Coprinus in 1838 by Elias Magnus Fries. The specific epithet is derived from the Latin word atramentum "ink".

The genus was formerly considered to be a large one with well over 100 species. However, molecular analysis of DNA sequences showed that most species belonged in the family Psathyrellaceae, distinct from the type species that belonged to the Agaricaceae. It was given its current binomial name in 2001 as a result, as this and other species were moved to the new genus Coprinopsis.

The term "tippler's bane" is derived from its ability to create acute sensitivity to alcohol, similar to disulfiram (Antabuse). Other common names include common ink cap and inky cap. The black liquid that this mushroom releases after being picked was once used as ink.

== Description ==
Measuring 3–10 centimetres (1 1/4–4 in) in diameter, the greyish or brownish-grey cap is furrowed, initially bell-shaped, and later more convex, splitting at the margin. It melts from the outside in. The very crowded gills are free; they are white at first, then grey or pinkish and turn black and deliquesce.

The stipe measures 5–17 cm (2–6 3/4 in) high by 1–2 cm thick, is grey in colour, and lacks a ring. In young groups, the stems may be obscured by the caps. The spore print is black and the almond-shaped spores measure 8–11 by 5–6 μm. The flesh is thin and pale grey in colour.

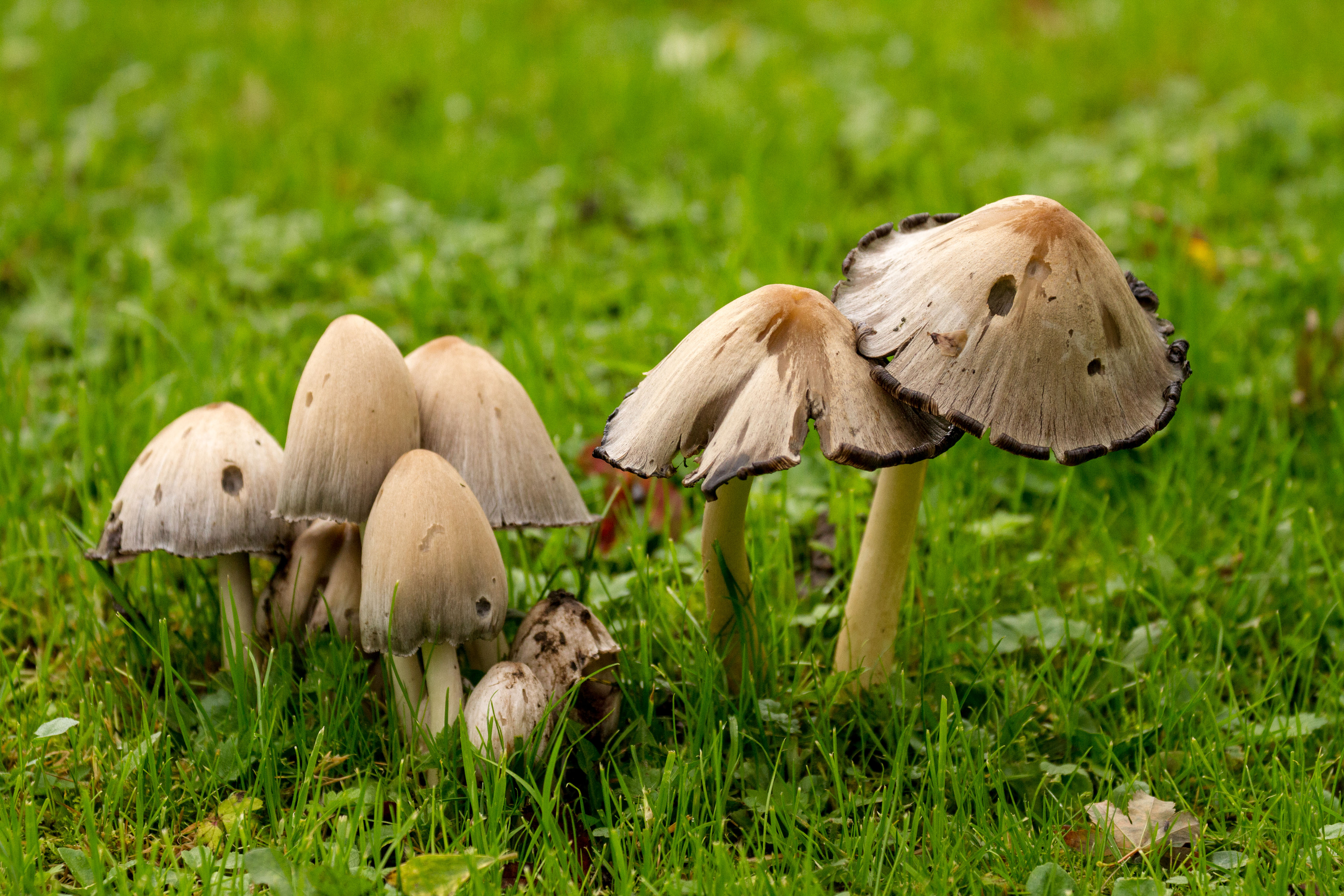
A group of young specimens

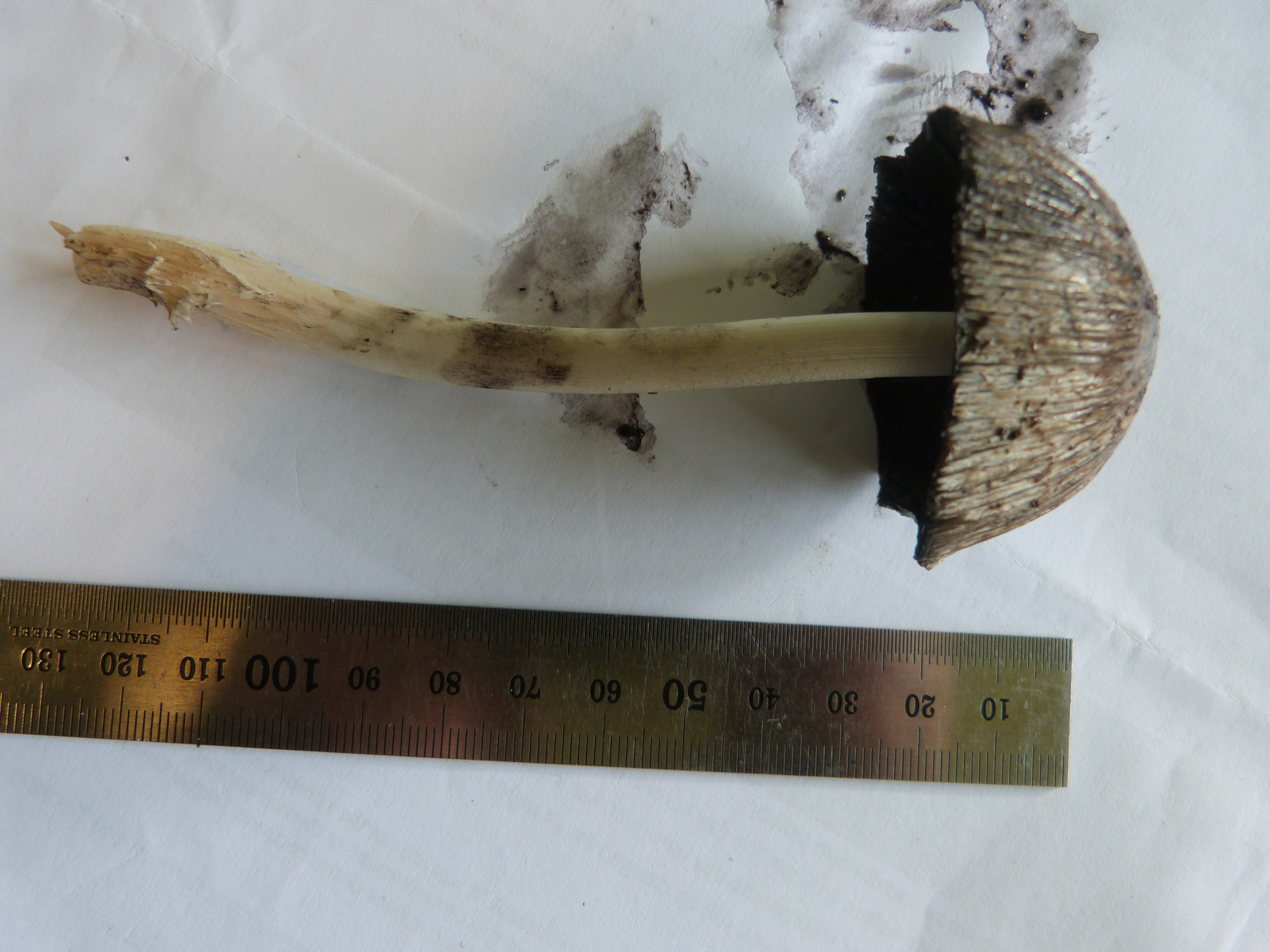
Cap spilling "ink"

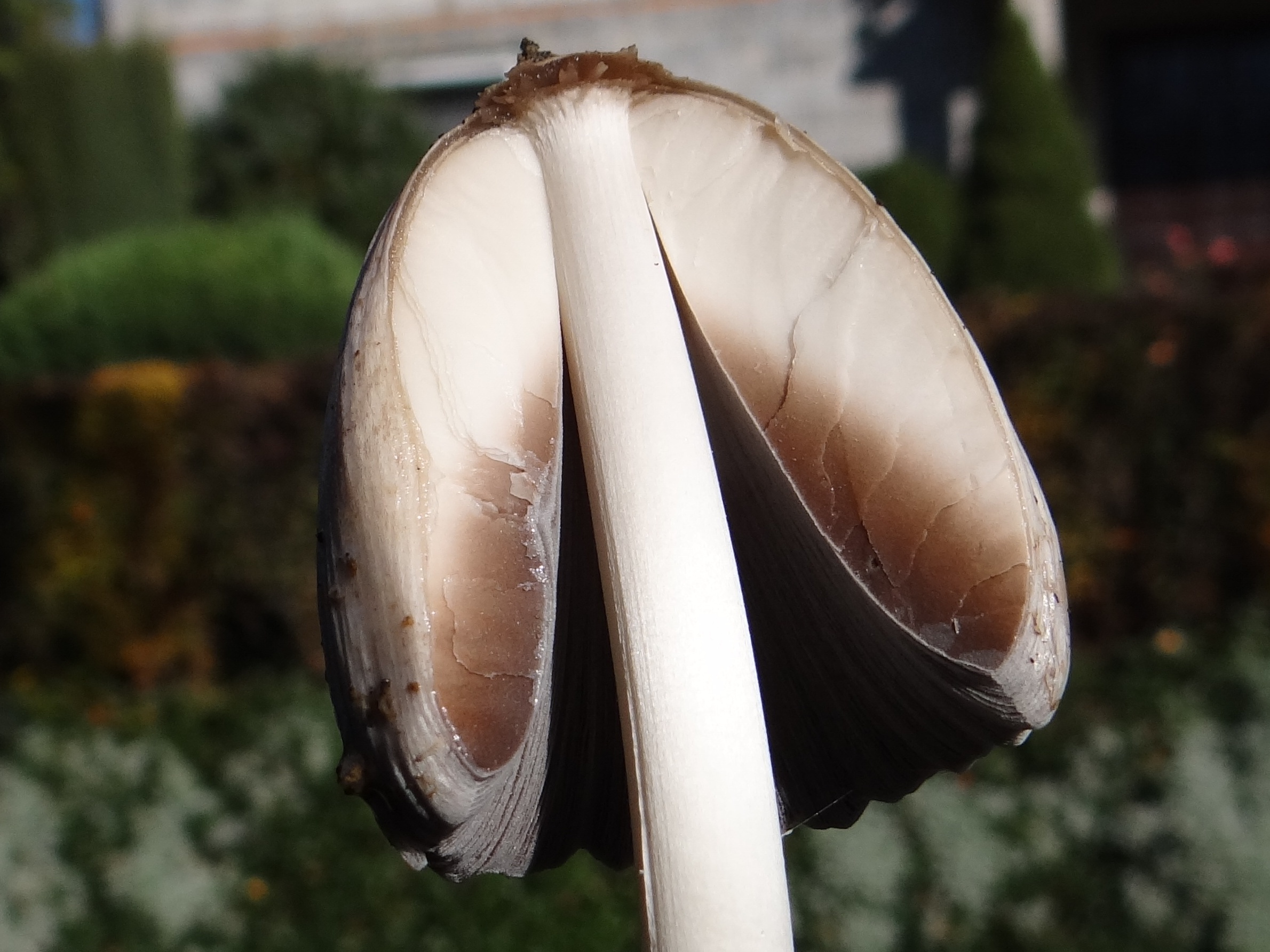
The inner flesh

=== Similar species ===
It can resemble several less common species in its genus.

== Distribution and habitat ==
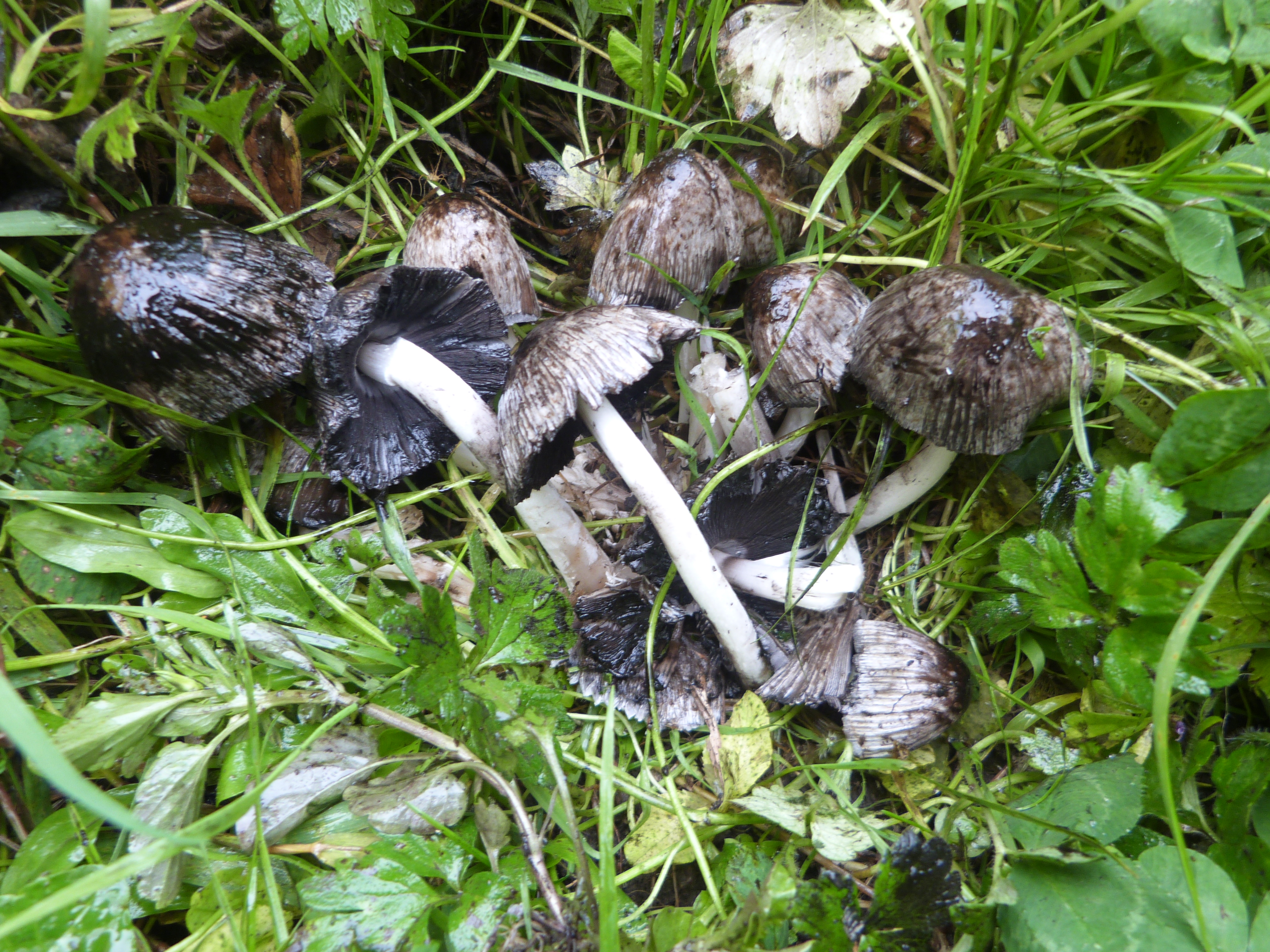
Ink cap tuft in New Zealand in March

Coprinopsis atramentaria occurs across the Northern Hemisphere, including Eurasia and North America, and has also been found in South Africa as well as Australia, where it has been recorded from such urban locations as the Royal Botanic Gardens in Sydney and around Lake Torrens.

Like many ink caps, it grows in tufts. It is commonly associated with buried wood and is found in grassland, meadows, disturbed ground, and open terrain from late spring to autumn. Fruiting bodies have been known to push their way up through asphalt and even tennis courts. It is also common in urban areas and appears in vacant lots, and tufts of fungi can be quite large and fruit several times a year. If dug up, the mycelium can often be found originating on buried dead wood.

== Toxicity and uses ==
Chemical structure of coprine

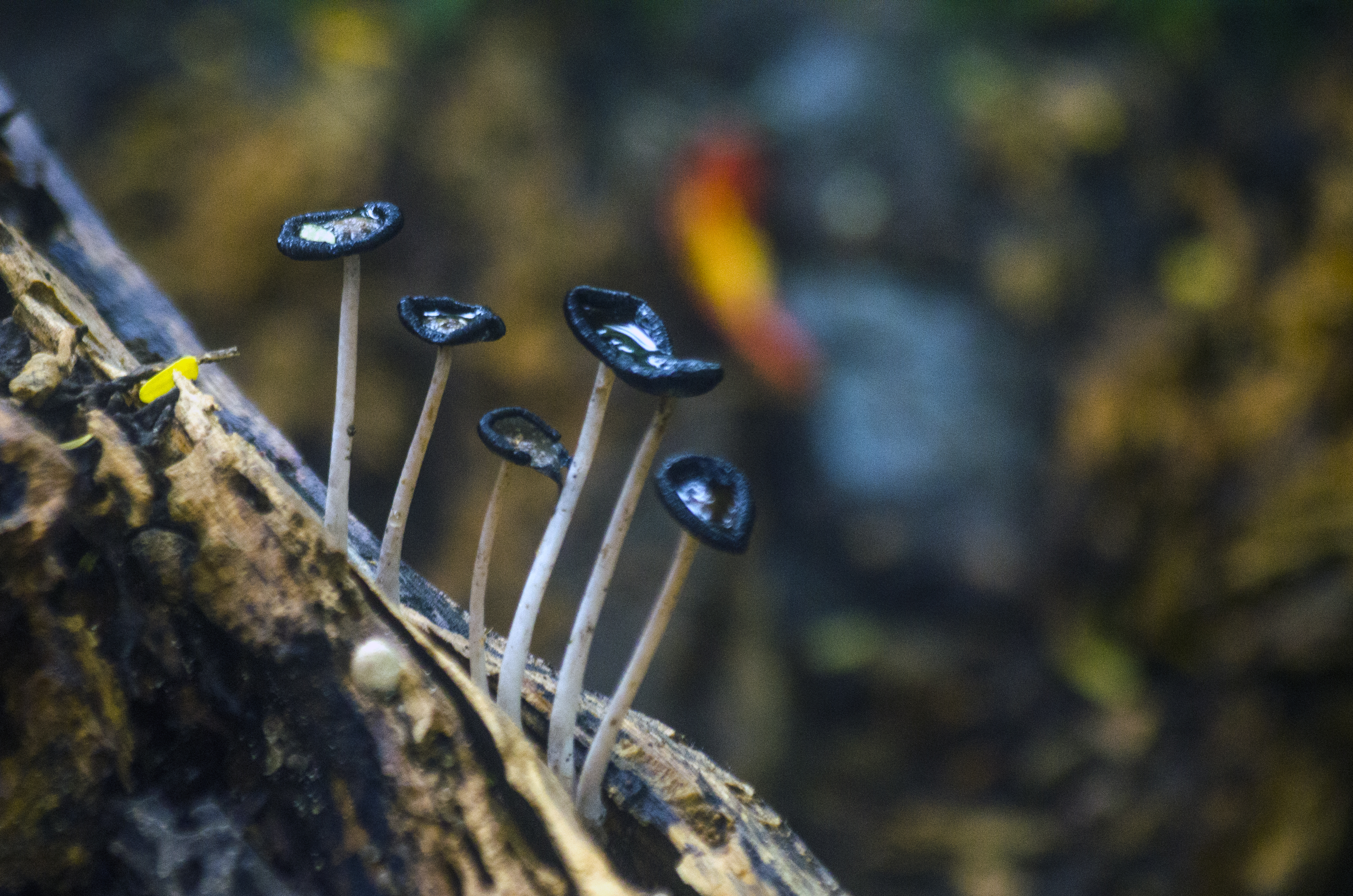
Black cap fungi, Rabindra Sarobar, Kolkata

The mushrooms are considered edible when young, but consuming them within a few hours of alcohol results in disulfiram-like symptoms. This interaction has only been known since the early part of the 20th century. Symptoms include facial reddening, nausea, vomiting, malaise, agitation, palpitations, and tingling in limbs, arising five to ten minutes after consumption of alcohol. If no more alcohol is consumed, they will generally subside over two or three hours. Symptom severity is proportional to the amount of alcohol consumed, becoming evident when blood alcohol concentration reaches 5 mg/dl, and prominent at concentrations of 50–100 mg/dl. Disulfiram has, however, been known to cause myocardial infarction (heart attack). The symptoms can occur if even a small amount of alcohol is consumed up to three days after eating the mushrooms, although they are milder as more time passes. Rarely, a cardiac arrhythmia, such as atrial fibrillation on top of supraventricular tachycardia, may develop. Because of these effects, in some cases, the mushroom has been used to cure alcoholism.

The fungus contains a cyclopropylglutamine compound called coprine. Its active metabolite, 1-aminocyclopropanol, blocks the action of an enzyme, acetaldehyde dehydrogenase, which breaks down acetaldehyde in the body. Acetaldehyde is an intermediate metabolite of ethanol and is responsible for most symptoms of a hangover; its effect on autonomic β receptors is responsible for the vasomotor symptoms.

Treatment involves reassuring the patient that the often frightening symptoms will pass, rehydration (fluid replacement) for fluid loss from vomiting, and monitoring for cardiac arrhythmias.

Large and prolonged doses of coprine were found to have gonadotoxic effects on rats and dogs in testing.

== See also ==
- List of Coprinopsis species
