= Cofactor =

Cofactor may refer to:

- Cofactor (biochemistry), a substance that needs to be present in addition to an enzyme for a certain reaction to be catalysed
- A domain parameter in elliptic curve cryptography, defined as the ratio between the order of a group and that of the subgroup
- Cofactor (linear algebra), the signed minor of a matrix
- Minor (linear algebra), an alternative name for the determinant of a smaller matrix than that which it describes
- Shannon cofactor, a term in Boole's (or Shannon's) expansion of a Boolean function

== See also ==
- Factor (disambiguation)
