= ALDH2 =

Enzyme

Identifiers
- Aliases: ALDH2, ALDH-E2, ALDHI, ALDM, aldehyde dehydrogenase 2 family (mitochondrial), aldehyde dehydrogenase 2 family member
- External IDs: OMIM: 100650; MGI: 99600; GeneCards: ALDH2
Available structures
PDB	Ortholog search: PDBe RCSB
PDB	List of PDB id codes 4KWG, 1CW3, 1NZW, 1NZX, 1NZZ, 1O00, 1O01, 1O02, 1O04, 1O05, 1ZUM, 2ONM, 2ONN, 2ONO, 2ONP, 2VLE, 3INJ, 3INL, 3N80, 3N81, 3N82, 3N83, 3SZ9, 4FQF, 4FR8, 4KWF
Enzyme activity
EC #	BRENDA	ExPASy	KEGG	MetaCyc
1.2.1.3	↗	↗	↗	↗

Gene location (Human)
Chr.	Chromosome 12 (human)
Band	12q24.12	Start	111,766,887 bp
Band	12q24.12	End	111,817,532 bp

Gene location (Mouse)
Chr.	Chromosome 5 (mouse)
Band	5|5 F	Start	121,704,090 bp
Band	5|5 F	End	121,731,887 bp
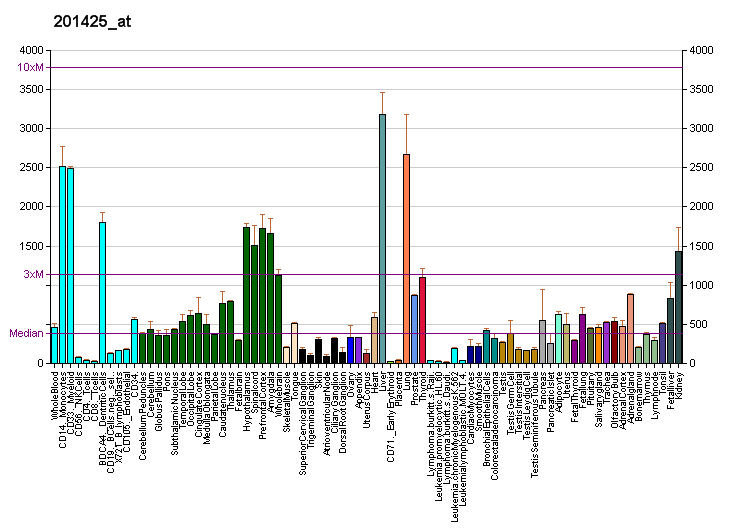
RNA expression pattern
Bgee	Human / Mouse (ortholog); Top expressed in: right lobe of liver; lower lobe of lung; dorsal motor nucleus of vagus nerve; external globus pallidus; parotid gland; Region I of hippocampus proper; gingival epithelium; internal globus pallidus; pars reticulata; right adrenal cortex / Top expressed in: granulocyte; left lobe of liver; olfactory epithelium; left colon; left lung; gallbladder; right lung; right lung lobe; left lung lobe; tunica adventitia of aorta; More reference expression data
BioGPS	More reference expression data
Gene ontology
Molecular function	electron transfer activity; oxidoreductase activity; aldehyde dehydrogenase [NAD(P)+ activity]; aldehyde dehydrogenase (NAD+) activity; NAD binding; oxidoreductase activity, acting on the aldehyde or oxo group of donors, NAD or NADP as acceptor; glyceraldehyde-3-phosphate dehydrogenase (NAD+) (non-phosphorylating) activity
Cellular component	extracellular exosome; mitochondrion; mitochondrial matrix
Biological process	ethanol catabolic process; metabolism; alcohol metabolic process; ethanol oxidation; carbohydrate metabolic process; electron transport chain
Sources:Amigo / QuickGO
Orthologs
Databases	NCBI: entry; OMA: entry
Species	Human	Mouse
Entrez	217	11669
Ensembl	ENSG00000111275	ENSMUSG00000029455
UniProt	P05091	P47738
RefSeq (mRNA)	NM_001204889; NM_000690	NM_009656; NM_001308450
RefSeq (protein)	NP_000681; NP_001191818	NP_001295379; NP_033786
Location (UCSC)	Chr 12: 111.77 – 111.82 Mb	Chr 5: 121.7 – 121.73 Mb
PubMed search
- Wikidata
View/Edit Human	View/Edit Mouse

Aldehyde dehydrogenase, mitochondrial is an enzyme that in humans is encoded by the ALDH2 gene located on chromosome 12. ALDH2 belongs to the aldehyde dehydrogenase family of enzymes. Aldehyde dehydrogenase is the second enzyme of the major oxidative pathway of alcohol metabolism. ALDH2 has a low K_{m} for acetaldehyde, and is localized in mitochondrial matrix. The other liver isozyme, ALDH1, localizes to the cytosol.

Most White people have both major isozymes, while approximately 36% of East Asians have the cytosolic isozyme but not a functional mitochondrial isozyme. As of 2023, it is estimated that as many as 709 million people (8.8% of the global population) carry the ALDH2*2 (E504K) mutation. A remarkably higher frequency of acute alcohol intoxication among East Asians than among Whites could be related to this absence of a catalytically active form of ALDH2. The increased exposure to acetaldehyde in individuals with the catalytically inactive form may also confer greater susceptibility to many types of cancer.

== Gene ==
The ALDH2 gene is about 44 kbp in length and contains at least 13 exons which encode 517 amino acid residues. Except for the signal NH2-terminal peptide, which is absent in the mature enzyme, the amino acid sequence deduced from the exons coincided with the reported primary structure of human liver ALDH2. Several introns contain Alu repetitive sequences. A TATA-like sequence (TTATAAAA) and a CAAT-like sequence (GTCATCAT) are located 473 and 515 bp, respectively, upstream from the translation initiation codon.

== Enzyme structure ==
ALDH2 is a tetrameric enzyme that contains three domains; two dinucleotide-binding domains and a three-stranded beta-sheet domain. The active site of ALDH2 is divided into two halves by the nicotinamide ring of nicotinamide adenine dinucleotide (NAD^{+}). Adjacent to the A-side (Pro-R) of the nicotinamide ring is a cluster of three cysteines (Cys301, Cys302 and Cys303) and adjacent to the B-side (Pro-S) are Thr244, Glu268, Glu476 and an ordered water molecule bound to Thr244 and Glu476. Although there is a recognizable Rossmann fold, the coenzyme-binding region of ALDH2 binds NAD^{+} in a manner not seen in other NAD^{+}-binding enzymes. The positions of the residues near the nicotinamide ring of NAD^{+} suggest a chemical mechanism whereby Glu268 functions as a general base through a bound water molecule. The sidechain amide nitrogen of Asn169 and the peptide nitrogen of Cys302 are in position to stabilize the oxyanion present in the tetrahedral transition state prior to hydride transfer. The functional importance of residue Glu487 now appears to be due to indirect interactions of this residue with the substrate-binding site via Arg264 and Arg475.

== Function ==
Mitochondrial aldehyde dehydrogenase belongs to the aldehyde dehydrogenase family of enzymes that catalyze the chemical transformation from acetaldehyde to acetic acid. Aldehyde dehydrogenase is the second enzyme of the major oxidative pathway of alcohol metabolism. Human ALDH2 is especially efficient on acetaldehyde compared to ALDH1.

Ethanol metabolism in humans

Additionally, ALDH2 functions as a protector against oxidative stress.

== Genetic variation ==
SNP: ALDH2*2
- Name(s): g.42421G>A, Glu504Lys
- Gene: ALDH2
- Chromosome: 12
- Region: Exon

External databases
- Ensembl: Human SNPView
- dbSNP: 671
- HapMap: 671
- SNPedia: 671

The inactivating ALDH2*2 mutation is "the most common single point mutation in humans". This mutation is found in very few White people, but about 50% of East Asians are heterozygous for this mutation. The ALDH2*2 allele encodes lysine instead of glutamic acid at amino acid 487, distorting the NAD+ binding site. ALDH2 assembles and functions as a tetramer and requires all four of its components to be active in order to metabolize acetaldehyde. People heterozygous for ALDH2*2 have only 10% to 45% enzyme activity, while those homozygous for ALDH2*2 have as little as 1% to 5% remaining activity.

The lack of ALDH2 activity has a number of consequences, detailed in section § Inhibition and genetic deficiency below.

=== Distribution ===
In the overall Japanese population, about 57% of individuals are homozygous for the normal allele, 40% are heterozygous for the ALDH2*2 allele, and 3% are homozygous for the ALDH2*2 allele.

== Clinical significance ==
=== Inhibition and genetic deficiency ===
==== Alcohol metabolism ====
The best-known consequence of ALDH2 dysfunction is in relation to the consumption of ethanol. People heterozygous or homozygous for the ALDH2*2 metabolize ethanol to acetaldehyde normally but metabolize acetaldehyde poorly. As a result, they accumulate increased levels of acetaldehyde after consumption of alcoholic beverages. Effects include facial flushing (i.e. the "alcohol flush reaction"), urticaria, systemic dermatitis, and alcohol-induced respiratory reactions such as rhinitis and the exacerbation of asthma bronchoconstriction. The cited allergic reaction-like symptoms: (a) do not appear due to classical IgE or T cell-related allergen-induced reactions but rather the actions of acetaldehyde in stimulating the release of histamine, a probable mediating cause of these symptoms; (b) typically occur within 30–60 minutes of ingesting alcoholic beverages; and (c) occur in other Asian as well as non-Asian individuals that are either seriously defective in metabolizing ingested ethanol past acetaldehyde to acetic acid or, alternatively, that metabolize ethanol too rapidly for ALDH2 processing.

People with a genetic ALDH2*2 deficiency have historically had a lower likelihood of developing alcoholism, both from stronger adverse effects and a possible reduction of dopamine release. However, this effect is not absolute: during the 1980s, there has been a steady increase in the number of Japanese alcoholics who carry the ALDH2*2 mutation. A strong social pressure to drink have overcome this genetic barrier to alcoholism. Disulfiram, which inhibits ALDH2 and causes a similar effect, has been used as an alcohol-quitting aid.

==== Various conditions ====
More recently, ALDH2 has been implicated in a number of pathways beyond alcohol metabolism. ALDH2 dysfunction is supposedly associated with a variety of human diseases including diabetes, neurodegenerative diseases, cardiovascular diseases and stroke, cancer, Fanconi anemia, pain, osteoporosis, and the process of aging. The inactivating ALDH2 rs671 polymorphism, present in up to 8% of the global population and in up to 50% of the East Asian population, is associated with increased risk of cardiovascular conditions such as coronary artery disease, alcohol-induced cardiac dysfunction, pulmonary arterial hypertension, heart failure and drug-induced cardiotoxicity.

==== Alzheimer's disease ====
A case-control study in a Japanese population showed that deficiency of ALDH2 activity influences the risk for late-onset Alzheimer's disease. The ALDH2 knockout mice display age-related memory deficits in various tasks, as well as endothelial dysfunction, brain atrophy, and other Alzheimer's disease-associated pathologies, including marked increases in lipid peroxidation products, amyloid-beta, p-tau and activated caspases. These behavioral and biochemical Alzheimer's disease-like deficits were efficiently ameliorated when these mice were treated with isotope-reinforced lipids (deuterated polyunsaturated fatty acids).

=== Activation ===
An activator of ALDH2 enzymatic activity, Alda-1 (N-(1,3-benzodioxol-5-ylmethyl)-2,6-dichlorobenzamide), has been shown to reduce ischemia-induced cardiac damage caused by myocardial infarction. Mirivadelgat has also been reported to activate ALDH2.

== Interactions ==
ALDH2 has been shown to interact with GroEL.

== See also ==
- Acetaldehyde dehydrogenase
- Alcohol dehydrogenase
- Alcohol flush reaction
- Alcohol-induced respiratory reactions
