= Coprine =

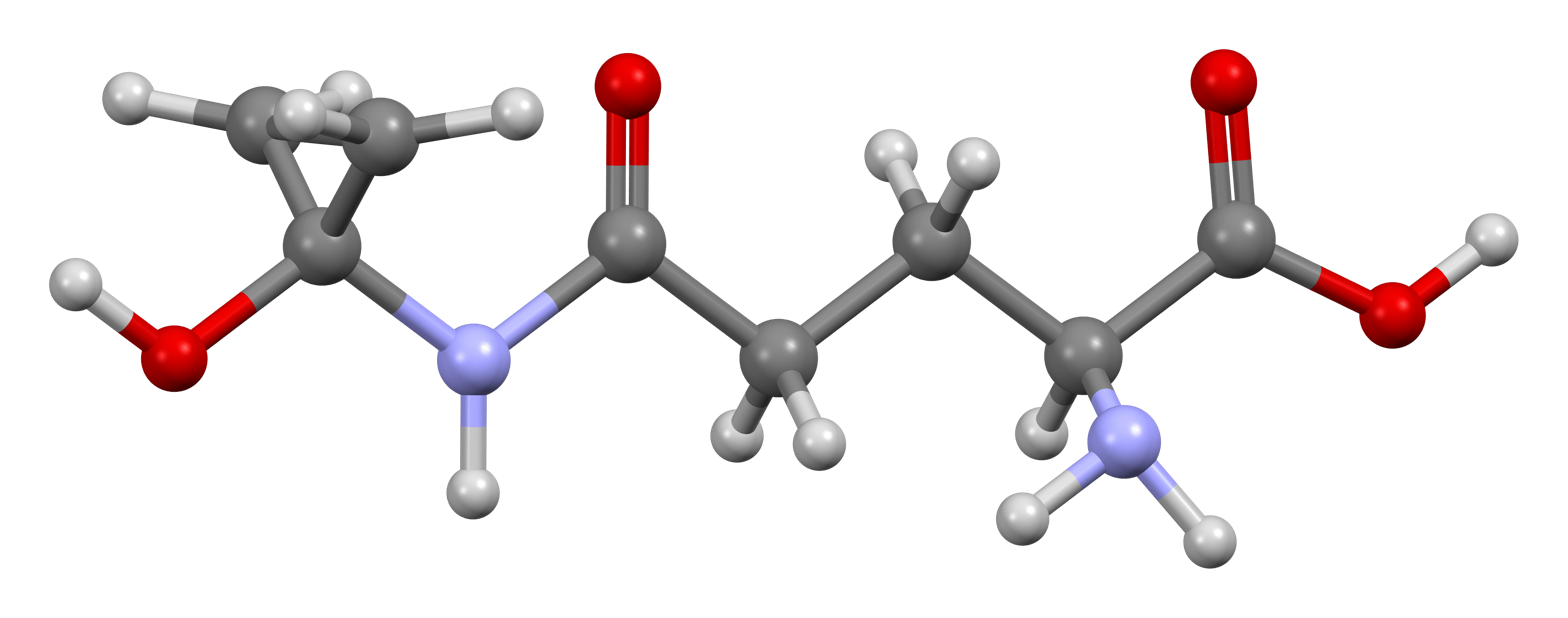

Names
- IUPAC name N^{5}-(1-Hydroxycyclopropyl)-L-glutamine
- Systematic IUPAC name (2S)-2-Amino-5-[(1-hydroxycyclopropyl)amino]-5-oxopentanoic acid

Identifiers
CAS Number	58919-61-2
3D model (JSmol)	Interactive image
ChemSpider	97180
PubChem CID	108079
UNII	28L2R8DM94
CompTox Dashboard (EPA)	DTXSID00974419
- InChI: InChI=1S/C8H14N2O4/c9-5(7(12)13)1-2-6(11)10-8(14)3-4-8/h5,14H,1-4,9H2,(H,10,11)(H,12,13)/t5-/m0/s1 Key: OEEZRBUCLFMTLD-YFKPBYRVSA-N; InChI=1/C8H14N2O4/c9-5(7(12)13)1-2-6(11)10-8(14)3-4-8/h5,14H,1-4,9H2,(H,10,11)(H,12,13)/t5-/m0/s1 Key: OEEZRBUCLFMTLD-YFKPBYRVBF
- SMILES: O=C(NC1(O)CC1)CC[C@@H](C(=O)O)N

Properties
Chemical formula	C_{8}H_{14}N_{2}O_{4}
Molar mass	202.210 g·mol^{−1}
Melting point	197 to 199 °C (387 to 390 °F; 470 to 472 K)
- Except where otherwise noted, data are given for materials in their standard state (at 25 °C [77 °F], 100 kPa). Infobox references

Coprine is a toxin. It was first isolated from common inkcap (Coprinopsis atramentaria). It occurs in mushrooms in the genus Coprinopsis, specifically within sections Alopeciae, Atramentariae, and Picaceae. When combined with alcohol, it causes "Coprinus syndrome". It inhibits the enzyme aldehyde dehydrogenase, which is involved in the metabolism of alcohol. This inhibition leads to a buildup of acetaldehyde, causing an alcohol flush reaction. Because of this, the mushroom is commonly referred to as Tippler's Bane.

== History ==
Because of the similarities to disulfram (tetraethylthiuram disulfide) poisoning, it was long speculated that disulfram could actually be produced by fungi. In 1956 it was reported that disulfram had been isolated from coprinus, but this finding could not be replicated. In 1975, coprine was identified as the compound in the common inkcap, with the mechanism identified in 1979.

== Symptoms ==
Symptoms of coprine poisoning include facial reddening/flushing, nausea, vomiting, malaise, agitation, palpitations, tingling in limbs, and sometimes headache and excessive salivation. This can be described as the alcohol flush reaction. Symptoms typically arise five to ten minutes after consumption of alcohol. If no more alcohol is consumed, the symptoms will generally subside over two to three hours, and symptom severity is proportional to the amount of alcohol consumed. Consumption of alcohol can induce these symptoms for up to 5 days after ingesting coprine. Interestingly, symptoms of coprine poisoning do not appear when the mushroom is ingested raw, but only when the mushroom is cooked.

In examining coprine poisoning cases in Germany in 2010, none of the patients died, and all made full recoveries after abstaining from alcohol. In one case medical care was not sought at all, and while there was a range in time of ethanol consumption after mushroom consumption, all the cases had well-cooked the mushrooms before ingestion.

The symptoms of coprine poisoning and alcohol consumption are similar to those induced by disulfiram (marketed as Antabuse), a drug utilized to treat chronic alcoholism by inducing severe side-effects to alcohol consumption. Because of this, research was done into the use of coprine as a similar drug for alcoholism. However, testing has shown coprine to have long-term mutagenic and reproductive effects, making it ill-suited for long-term use.

== Mechanism of action ==
Coprine is a hydrolytic prodrug of 1-aminocyclopropanol which is a covalent inhibitor of the enzyme aldehyde dehydrogenase. 1-aminocyclopropanol quickly converts to a reactive diol known as cyclopropanone hydrate, which binds covalently to the thiol present in the active site of the enzyme, deactivating the dehydrogenase activity. This inhibition then causes a buildup of acetaldehyde if ethanol is ingested. Since acetaldehyde is toxic and can no longer be metabolized to the less toxic acetic acid, the characteristic symptoms of coprine poisoning occur. However, as shown in the mechanism below, the covalent bonding is reversible, which is what allows symptoms to subside if no more alcohol is consumed.

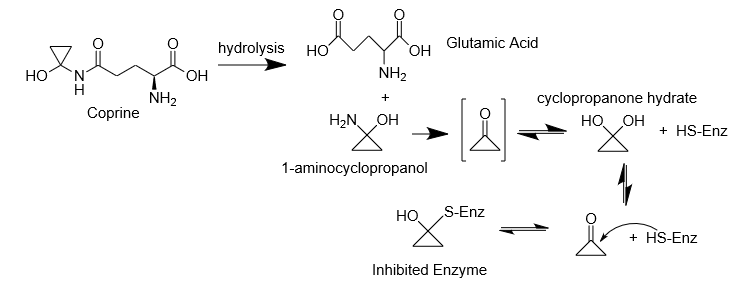

1-Aminocyclopropanol also deactivates the esterase activity of aldehyde dehydrogenase, but less significantly.

== Synthesis ==
Coprine is the first ever reported cyclopropanol containing secondary metabolite. Chemical synthesis can be effectively carried out by conducting an N-acylation reaction on 1-aminocyclopropanol. Treatment of isocyanatocyclopropane with hydrochloric acid leads to the hydrochloride of 1-aminocyclopropanol. Adding sodium hydroxide to create 1-aminocyclopropanol will destabilize the structure, so synthesis must be conducted using the hydrochloride. The addition of the hydrochloride to N-phthaloyl-L-glutamic anhydride will undergo acylation. Lastly, the blocking group is removed using hydrazine, yielding coprine. The enantiomer, isocoprine, is formed in negligible quantities in small-scale synthesis but is synthesized in higher amounts in large-scale, industrial synthesis.
