= Acetaldehyde dehydrogenase =

Class of enzymes

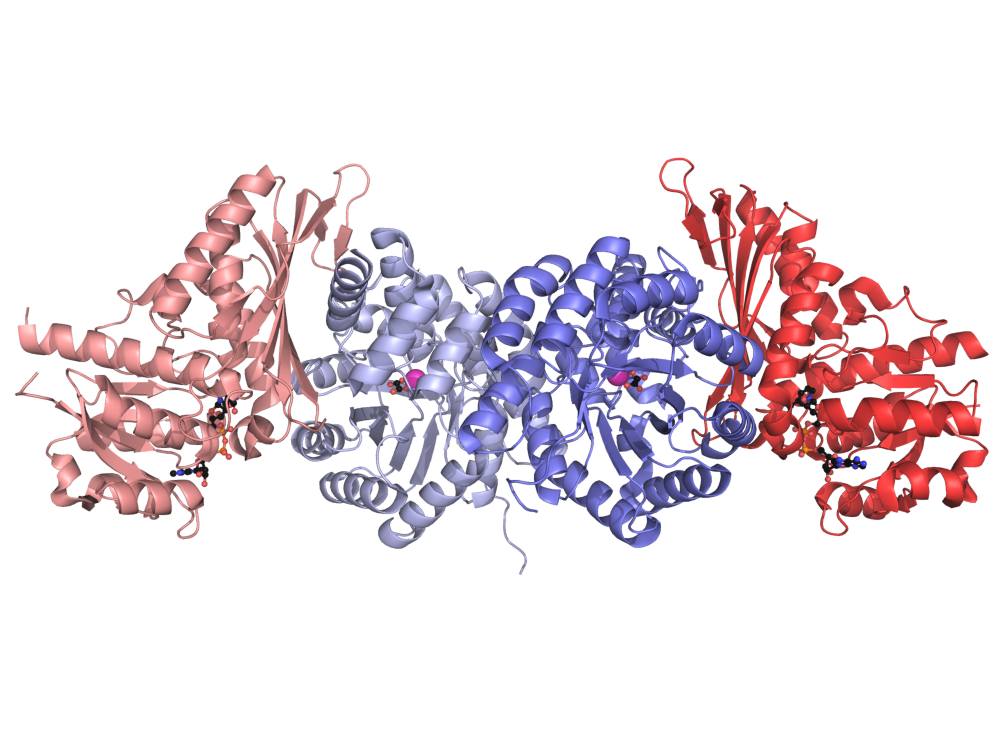
- Pseudomonas sp. aldolase-dehydrogenase heterotetramer assembly consisting of 4-hydroxy-2-ketovalerate aldolase (blue) and acetaldehyde dehydrogenase (red). PDB: 1NVM

Identifiers
- EC no.: 1.2.1.10
- CAS no.: 9028-91-5

Databases
- IntEnz: IntEnz view
- BRENDA: BRENDA entry
- ExPASy: NiceZyme view
- KEGG: KEGG entry
- MetaCyc: metabolic pathway
- PRIAM: profile
- PDB structures: RCSB PDB PDBe PDBsum
- Gene Ontology: AmiGO / QuickGO
Search
- PMC: articles
- PubMed: articles
- NCBI: proteins

(Acetylating) Acetaldehyde dehydrogenases are a class of enzymes found in bacteria. Acetylating acetaldehyde dehydrogenases (EC 1.2.1.10) are dehydrogenase enzymes which catalyze the conversion of acetaldehyde into acetyl-CoA, or the reverse. This can be summarized as follows:

acetaldehyde
+
NAD^{+}
Coenzyme A
acetaldehyde dehydrogenase
H^{+}
H^{+}
Acetyl-CoA
+ NADH

This enzyme is part of ethanol fermentation in certain species, and in particular the conversion of pyruvate to ethanol. This three step pathway starts by converting pyruvate to Acetyl-CoA, then uses this enzyme to produce acetaldehyde, and finally uses an alcohol dehydrogenase to convert acetaldehyde to ethanol. This is the most widespread approach in bacteria, but a different 2 step pathway that uses pyruvate decarboxylase is more common in yeast.

== Structure ==
In bacteria, acylating acetaldehyde dehydrogenase forms a bifunctional heterodimer with metal-dependent 4-hydroxy-2-ketovalerate aldolase. Utilized in the bacterial degradation of toxic aromatic compounds, the enzyme's crystal structure indicates that intermediates are shuttled directly between active sites through a hydrophobic intermediary channel, providing an unreactive environment in which to move the reactive acetaldehyde intermediate from the aldolase active site to the acetaldehyde dehydrogenase active site. Such communication between proteins allows for the efficient transfer substrates from one active site to the next.
