= List of Coprinus species =

This is a list of species in the agaric genus Coprinus.

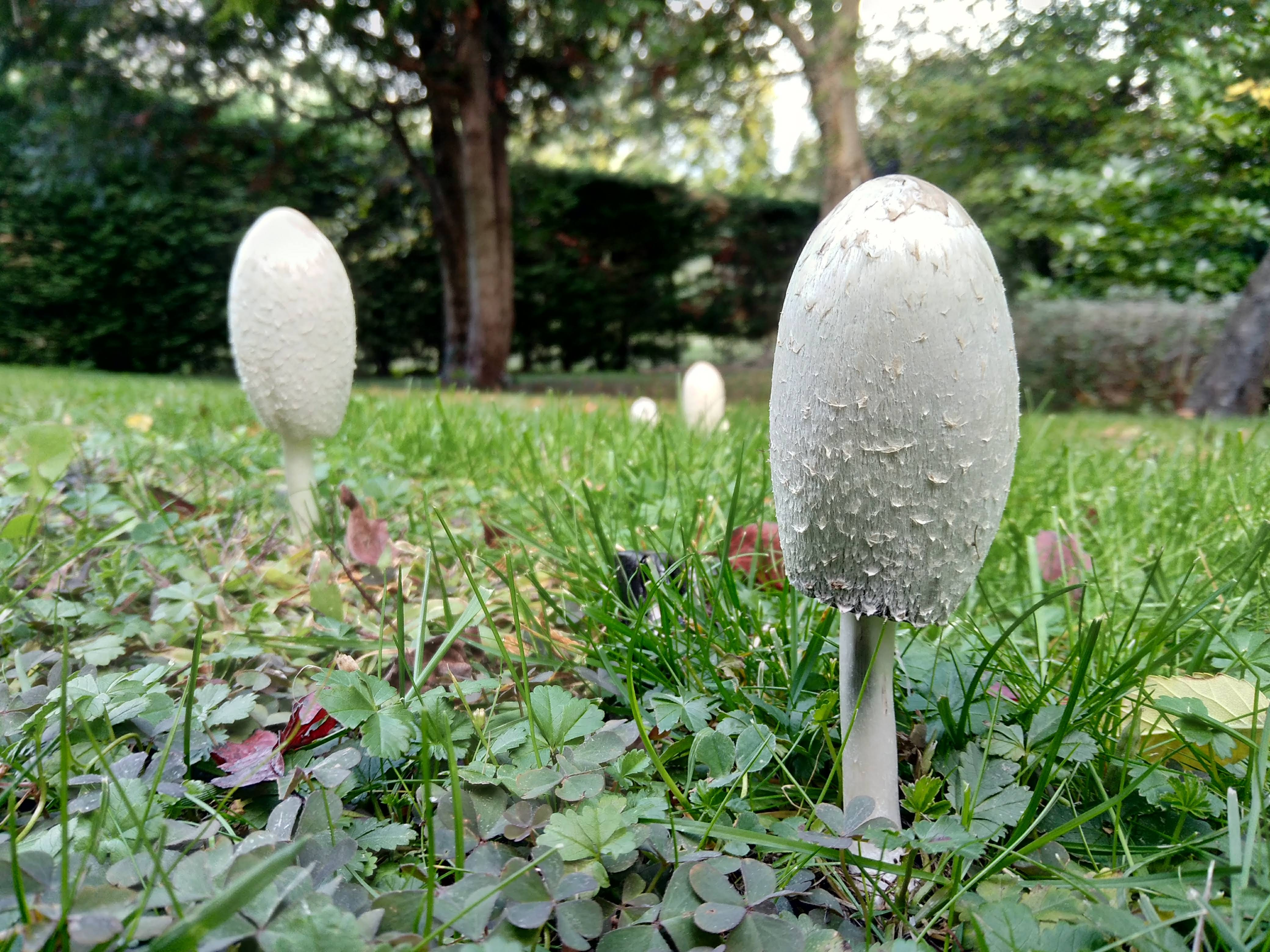
Coprinus comatus

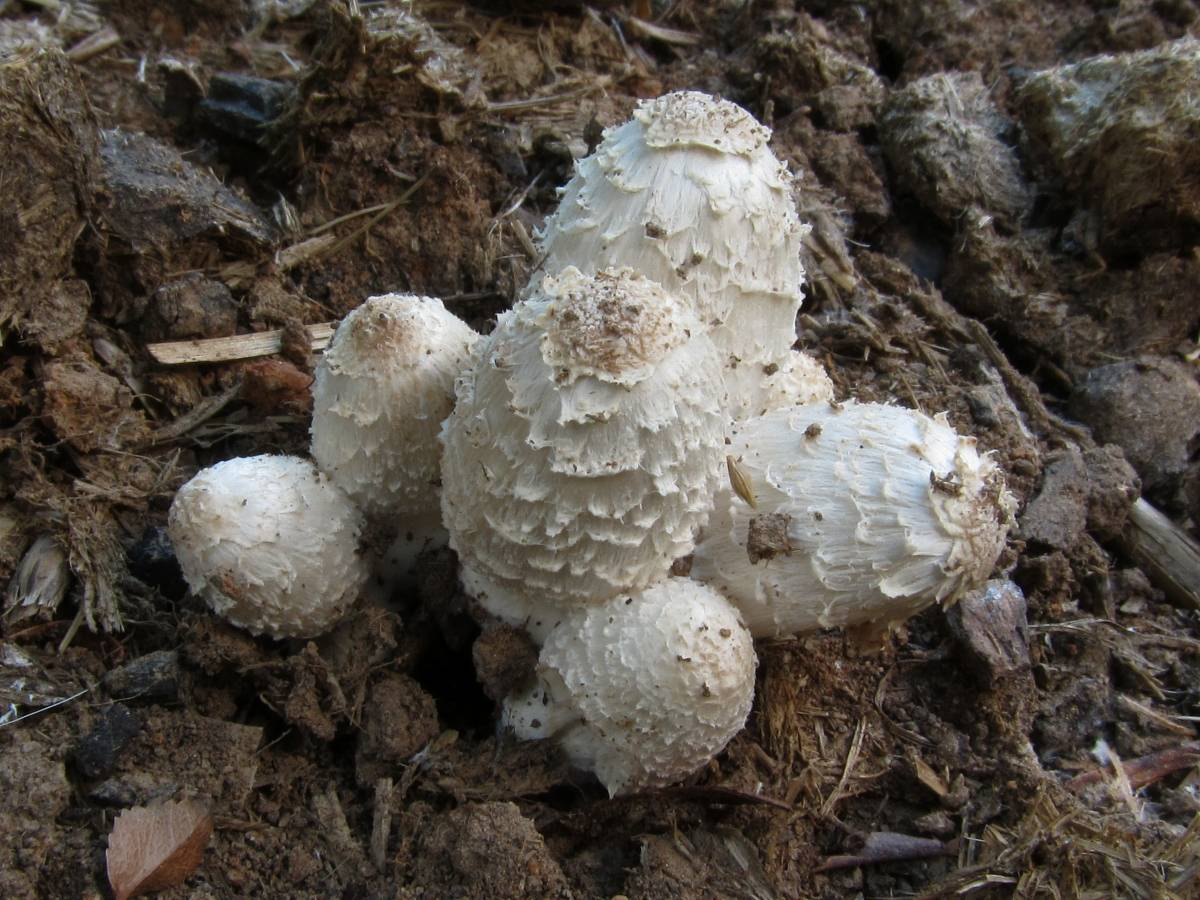
Coprinus sterquilinus

== Species ==
As of August 2022, Species Fungorum accepted 141 species of Coprinus.

1. Coprinus acidorus
2. Coprinus agricola
3. Coprinus alachuanus
4. Coprinus albidofloccosus
5. Coprinus alnicola
6. Coprinus amphibius
7. Coprinus apiculatus
8. Coprinus arachnoideus
9. Coprinus arenacolens
10. Coprinus arenatus
11. Coprinus asterophoroides
12. Coprinus asterophorus
13. Coprinus astroideus
14. Coprinus ater
15. Coprinus aurantiacus
16. Coprinus aureovillosus
17. Coprinus australiensis
18. Coprinus bakeri
19. Coprinus bambusicola
20. Coprinus baumannii
21. Coprinus boninensis
22. Coprinus bryantii
23. Coprinus callistoflavus
24. Coprinus calvescens
25. Coprinus calyptratus
26. Coprinus capillaripes
27. Coprinus chacaritae
28. Coprinus cheesmanii
29. Coprinus cineratus
30. Coprinus citrinovelatus
31. Coprinus coffeicola
32. Coprinus colensoi
33. Coprinus colosseus
34. Coprinus columellifer
35. Coprinus comatoides
36. Coprinus comatus
37. Coprinus concolor
38. Coprinus confertus
39. Coprinus cono-truncatus
40. Coprinus coopertus
41. Coprinus deserticola
42. Coprinus disseminatoides
43. Coprinus ebulbosus
44. Coprinus echinatulus
45. Coprinus echinatus
46. Coprinus edulis
47. Coprinus elongatipes
48. Coprinus flavogriseus
49. Coprinus flos-lactis
50. Coprinus fuscosporus
51. Coprinus gibbsii
52. Coprinus giganteoporus
53. Coprinus giganteosporus
54. Coprinus giganteus
55. Coprinus gigasporus
56. Coprinus glandulifer
57. Coprinus globisporus
58. Coprinus grambergii
59. Coprinus grandisporus
60. Coprinus griseofoetidus
61. Coprinus heimii
62. Coprinus humilis
63. Coprinus idiolepis
64. Coprinus ixosporus
65. Coprinus jalapensis
66. Coprinus laceratus
67. Coprinus laciniatus
68. Coprinus laniger
69. Coprinus leucostictus
70. Coprinus leviceps
71. Coprinus levipes
72. Coprinus levisticolens
73. Coprinus littoralis
74. Coprinus longipes
75. Coprinus macrosporus
76. Coprinus marginatus
77. Coprinus melo
78. Coprinus micaceoides
79. Coprinus miniatoflexuosus
80. Coprinus molestus
81. Coprinus neoradicans
82. Coprinus nigrostriatus
83. Coprinus ornatus
84. Coprinus palmeranus
85. Coprinus pampeanus
86. Coprinus paramicaceus
87. Coprinus parvisporus
88. Coprinus perpusillus
89. Coprinus petasiformis
90. Coprinus phalloideus
91. Coprinus phylladophilus
92. Coprinus picosporus
93. Coprinus pinetorum
94. Coprinus platensis
95. Coprinus platysporus
96. Coprinus plumbeus
97. Coprinus praemagnus
98. Coprinus preussii
99. Coprinus pseudocomatus
100. Coprinus pseudodomesticus
101. Coprinus pseudoplicatus
102. Coprinus pusio
103. Coprinus quadrifidus
104. Coprinus retisporus
105. Coprinus revolutus
106. Coprinus rimosus
107. Coprinus romagnesii
108. Coprinus roseistipitatus
109. Coprinus rostrupianus
110. Coprinus rotundisporus
111. Coprinus rufolanatus
112. Coprinus saatiensis
113. Coprinus sclerotianus
114. Coprinus semianus
115. Coprinus semilanatus
116. Coprinus seymourii
117. Coprinus sigillatus
118. Coprinus spadiceisporus
119. Coprinus speciosulus
120. Coprinus sphaerophorus
121. Coprinus spragueiformis
122. Coprinus stanfordianus
123. Coprinus staudtii
124. Coprinus steppicola
125. Coprinus sterquilinus
126. Coprinus stiriacus
127. Coprinus straminis
128. Coprinus subacaulis
129. Coprinus subplicatilis
130. Coprinus subradiatus
131. Coprinus subroris
132. Coprinus suburticicola
133. Coprinus trigonosporus
134. Coprinus umbrinus
135. Coprinus uspallatae
136. Coprinus velox
137. Coprinus virgineus
138. Coprinus volutus
139. Coprinus vosoustii
140. Coprinus westii
141. Coprinus xerophilus
