= Inkcap =

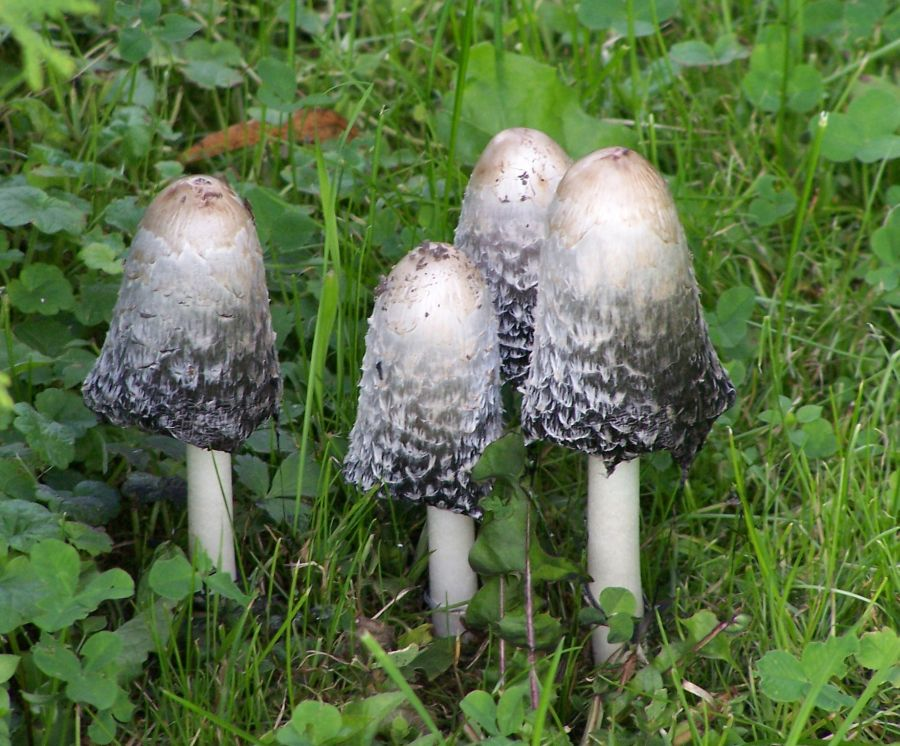
The edible shaggy inkcap

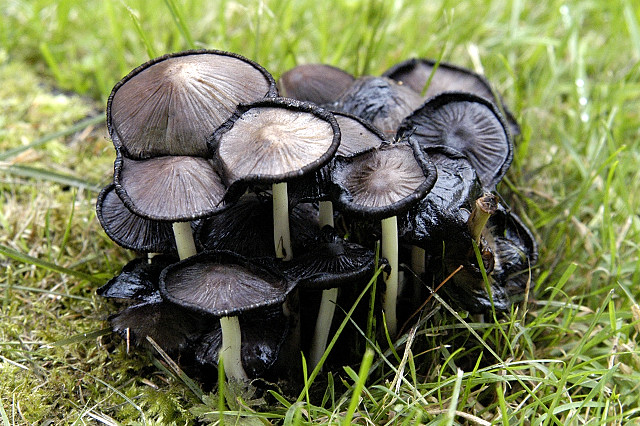
The conditionally edible common inkcap

Inkcap may refer to any of a number of mushrooms of the genera Coprinus, Coprinellus and Coprinopsis.

The best known, and very good to eat:

- Coprinus comatus, the shaggy inkcap, lawyer's wig, or shaggy mane.

The next best known, and also conditionally edible:

- Coprinopsis atramentaria, the common inkcap, inky cap, or tippler's bane. Edible, but causes effects similar to those of disulfiram. As such, alcohol is to be avoided before, during and after consumption.

Also any of the following, many of which are poisonous:

- genus Coprinus:
  - C. alopecius, the distinguished inkcap
  - C. sterquilinus, the midden inkcap
- genus Coprinellus:
  - C. disseminatus, the fairy inkcap, fairies' bonnets, or trooping crumble cap
  - C. domesticus, the firerug inkcap
  - C. micaceus, the glistening inkcap, mica cap, or shiny cap
- genus Coprinopsis:
  - C. acuminata, the humpback inkcap
  - C. ammophilae, the dune inkcap
  - C. episcopalis, the mitre inkcap
  - C. jonesii, the bonfire inkcap
  - C. lagopus, the hare's foot inkcap or harefoot mushroom
  - C. nivea, the snowy inkcap
  - C. picacea, the magpie inkcap or magpie fungus
  - C. scobicola, the sawdust inkcap
  - C. stangliana, the pied inkcap
