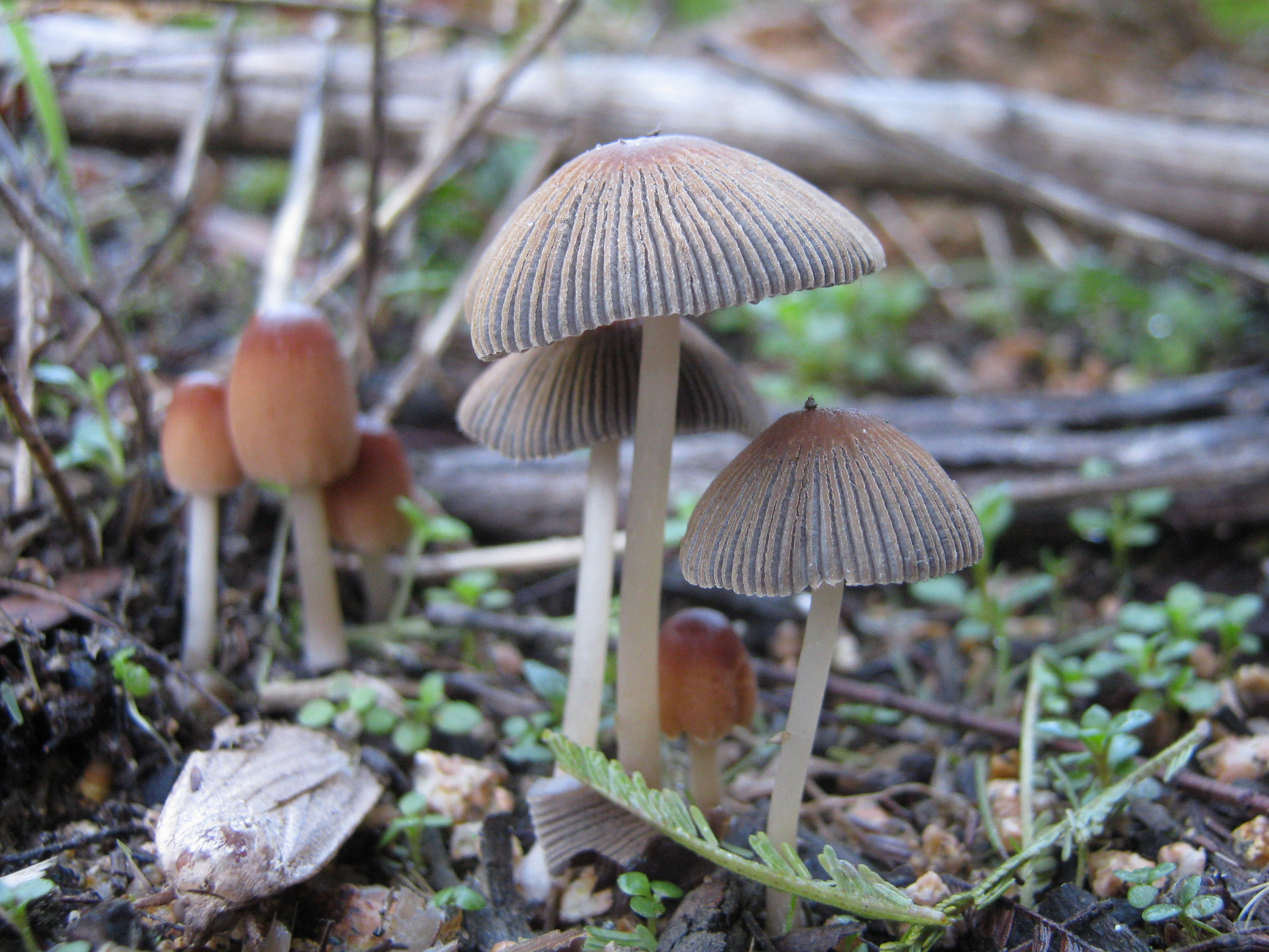

Scientific classification
- Kingdom: Fungi
- Division: Basidiomycota
- Class: Agaricomycetes
- Order: Agaricales
- Family: Psathyrellaceae
- Genus: Parasola
- Species: P. auricoma

Binomial name
- Parasola auricoma (Pat.) Redhead, Vilgalys & Hopple (2001)

Synonyms
- Coprinus auricomus Pat. (1886); Coprinus hansenii J.E.Lange (1915); Pseudocoprinus besseyi A.H.Sm. (1946); Coprinus elongatipes A.H.Sm. & Hesler (1946)

= Parasola auricoma =

Species of fungus

Parasola auricoma or goldenhaired inkcap is a species of agaric fungus in the family Psathyrellaceae first described scientifically in 1886.

The small, umbrella-shaped fruit bodies (mushrooms) of the fungus grow in grass or woodchips and are short-lived, usually collapsing with age in a few hours. The caps are up to 6 cm (2.4 in) wide, initially elliptical before flattening out, and colored reddish-brown to greyish, depending on their age and hydration. They are pleated with radial grooves extending from the center to the edge of the cap. The slender, whitish stems are up to 12 cm (4.7 in) long and a few millimeters thick. Microscopically, P. auricoma is characterized by the presence of setae (thick-walled bristles) in its cap cuticle. This characteristic, in addition to the relatively large, ellipsoid spores can be used to distinguish it from other morphologically similar Parasola species.

The species is found in Europe, Japan, and North America.

== Taxonomy ==
The species was first described in 1886 by French mycologist Narcisse Théophile Patouillard as Coprinus auricomus. It was transferred to Parasola in 2001 when molecular phylogenetics was used to sort the coprinoid genera (i.e., Coprinus and the segregate genera Coprinopsis, Coprinellus, and Parasola) into natural monophyletic groups. According to the nomenclatural database MycoBank, Parasola hansenii, described by Jakob Emanuel Lange in 1915 and named in honor of Danish mycologist Emil Christian Hansen, is a facultative synonym (based on a different type). Although this synonymy is accepted by several authorities, P.D. Orton and Roy Watling disagree, suggesting that C. hansenii is a forgotten species that requires reanalysis.

In a 2010 study of the type material of several coprinoid taxa, Laszlo Nagy and colleagues assigned Patouillard's plate 453 (containing the original description) as the lectotype for P. auricoma, as they believed it to be "sufficiently diagnostic for a clear-cut definition of this taxon." They also determined that Pseudocoprinus besseyi and Coprinus elongatipes (both species were described in a 1946 publication by Alexander H. Smith and Lexemuel Ray Hesler) were conspecific with P. auricoma.

The placement of P. auricoma within Parasola is somewhat controversial. It has often been classified in the section Auricomi, a grouping of species characterized by the absence of a veil, and the occasional presence of caulocystidia (cystidia on the stem), pileocystidia (cystidia on the cap surface), or dark setae-like elements. Several molecular phylogenetics studies have confirmed its inclusion in the Parasola clade, but its relationship to other members of the group have not been fully resolved due to limited sampling. A recent analysis suggests that in the phylogenetic tree of Parasola, P. auricoma and P. conopilus form a tritomy with the crown Parasola species.

== Description ==
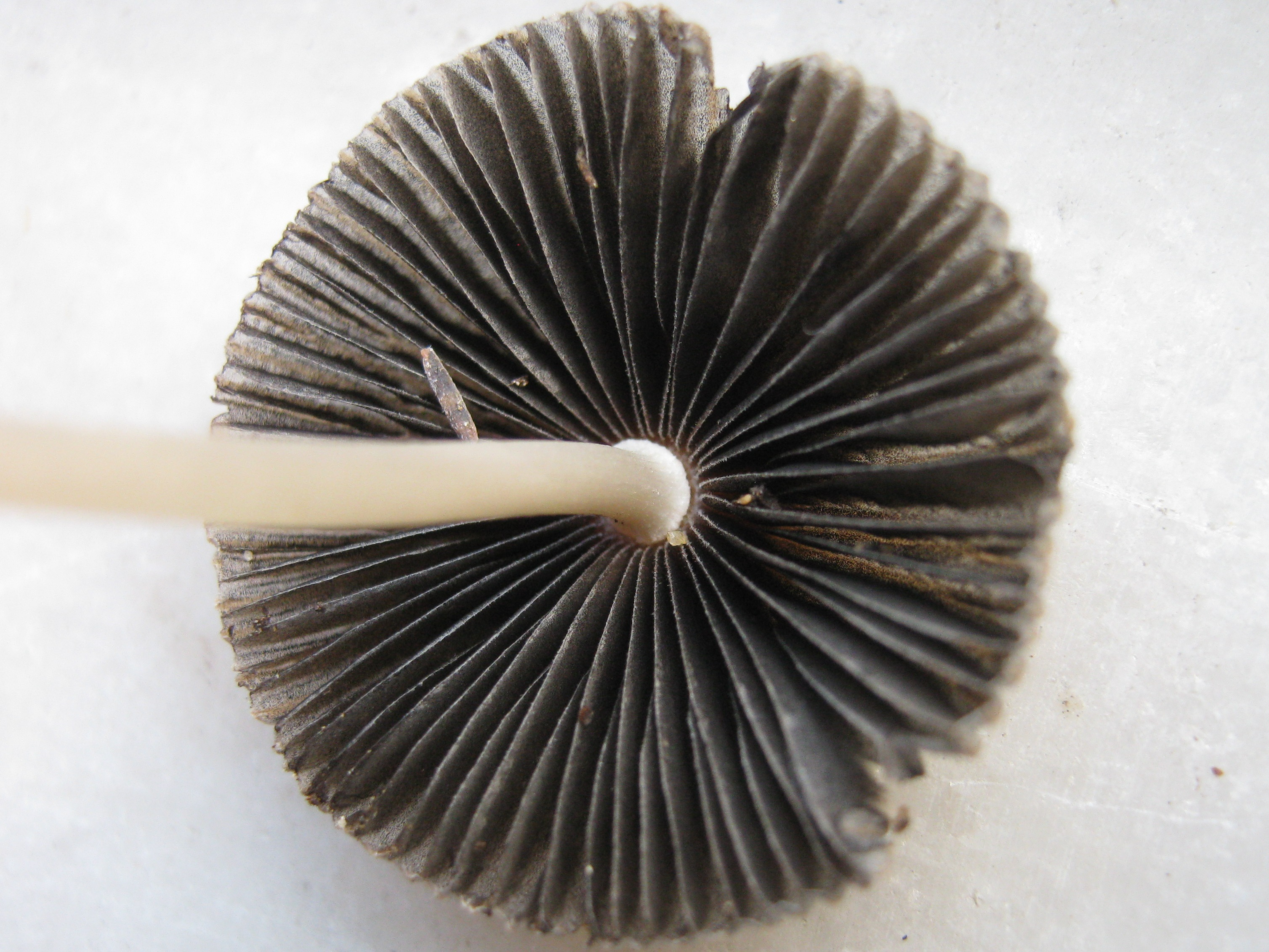
Mature gills are greyish brown to blackish.

The fungus produces fruit bodies with caps that are initially egg-shaped with margins curled inward; as the cap expands, it becomes conical and eventually flat or slightly depressed in the center, ultimately reaching a diameter of 6 cm (2.4 in). The fruit bodies are hygrophanous, and so will change color depending on their state of hydration. When the fruit bodies are young and fresh, the caps are reddish brown and can glisten, especially if wet. As the mushroom matures, the outer edge of the cap turn a greyish color while the center remains reddish brown. Radial grooves extend from the center of the cap to the margins. The caps have minute hairs (setae) that are visible through a hand lens.

The gills are free from attachment to the stem, and have a width of 0.2–0.4 cm (0.08–0.16 in). They are initially whitish before turning greyish brown, and eventually become blackish with a dark margin as the spores mature. Unlike some other coprinoid mushrooms, the gills do not deliquesce—a process whereby the gills dissolve into an inky black mass as they release their spores. The whitish stem is up to 12 cm (4.7 in) long and 0.4 cm (0.16 in) thick, hollow, and fragile. Young fruit bodies can have abundant, thick-walled hairs at the base of the stem, but these typically disappear as the mushroom matures. The flesh is thin, fragile, yellowish to brownish, and lacks any appreciable odor or taste. The spore print is brownish-black. The edibility of P. auricoma is not known with certainty, but the fruit bodies are small and insubstantial.

The spores are ellipsoid, have a central germ pore, and measure 10–14 by 5.75–8 μm. The basidia (spore-bearing cells) are club-shaped and four-spored. The colorless pleurocystidia (cystidia on the gill face) measure 70–140 by 20–45 μm, and are roughly elliptical to flask-shaped, while the similarly shaped cheilocystidia (found on the gill edge) measure 50–95 by 15–25 μm. Clamp connections are present in the hyphae of all tissues of P. auricoma. The cap cuticle comprises a layer of club-shaped, thin-walled cells measuring 25–40 by 10–30 μm interspersed with long, dark, thick-walled setae. Yellowish-brown setae are plentiful on the cap surface, and consist of an elongated, hair-like segment up to 315 μm long, attached to the surface by a bulbous base that is 3–9 μm wide.

=== Similar species ===
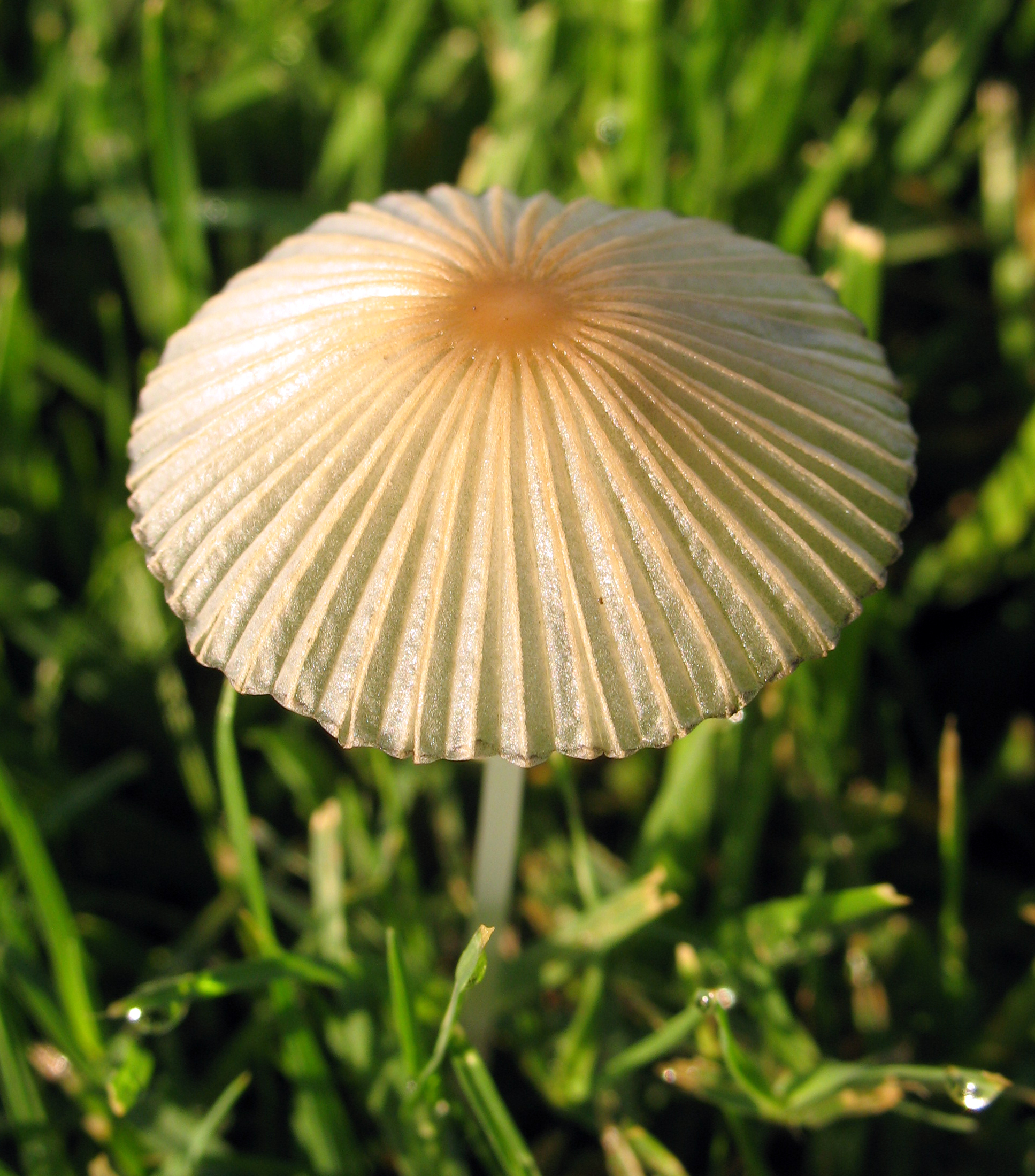
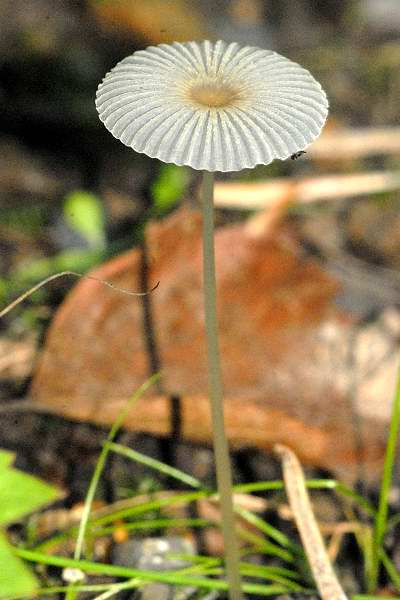
Similar Parasola species, including P. plicatilis (left) and P. leiocephala (right), lack setae on the cap.

Several characters serve to help distinguish Parasola auricoma from similar coprinoid mushrooms that grow in woodchips, including a lack of deliquescence, and the lack of a veil. Microscopically, it is characterized by the long, gold-pigmented, thick-walled setae on the cap, and ellipsoid spores with a germ pore. The distinctly grooved and pleated cap margin indicates that it is allied with the coprinoid species and not with the genus Psathyrella. Similar Parasola species include the common and widespread P. plicatilis, P. leiocephala, P. lilatincta, and P. kuehneri. Only microscopy will definitively separate these from P. auricoma—none of them have setae on the cap.

== Habitat and distribution ==
Parasola auricoma is a saprobic species, and so obtains nutrients by breaking down organic matter into simpler molecules. The fruit bodies grow either singly or in groups, often in large numbers, at road sides in deciduous forests, or on grassy areas. The mushrooms are short-lived, usually lasting only for a few hours before collapsing. Common in Europe and North America (including Hawaii), it has also been recorded from Japan. In Europe, fruit bodies appear most commonly in spring and summer months, while in North America, fruiting is more common in the late summer and autumn, after rains. The mushroom was reported in Bogotá, Colombia, by mycologist Juan Camilo Rodríguez Martínez.
