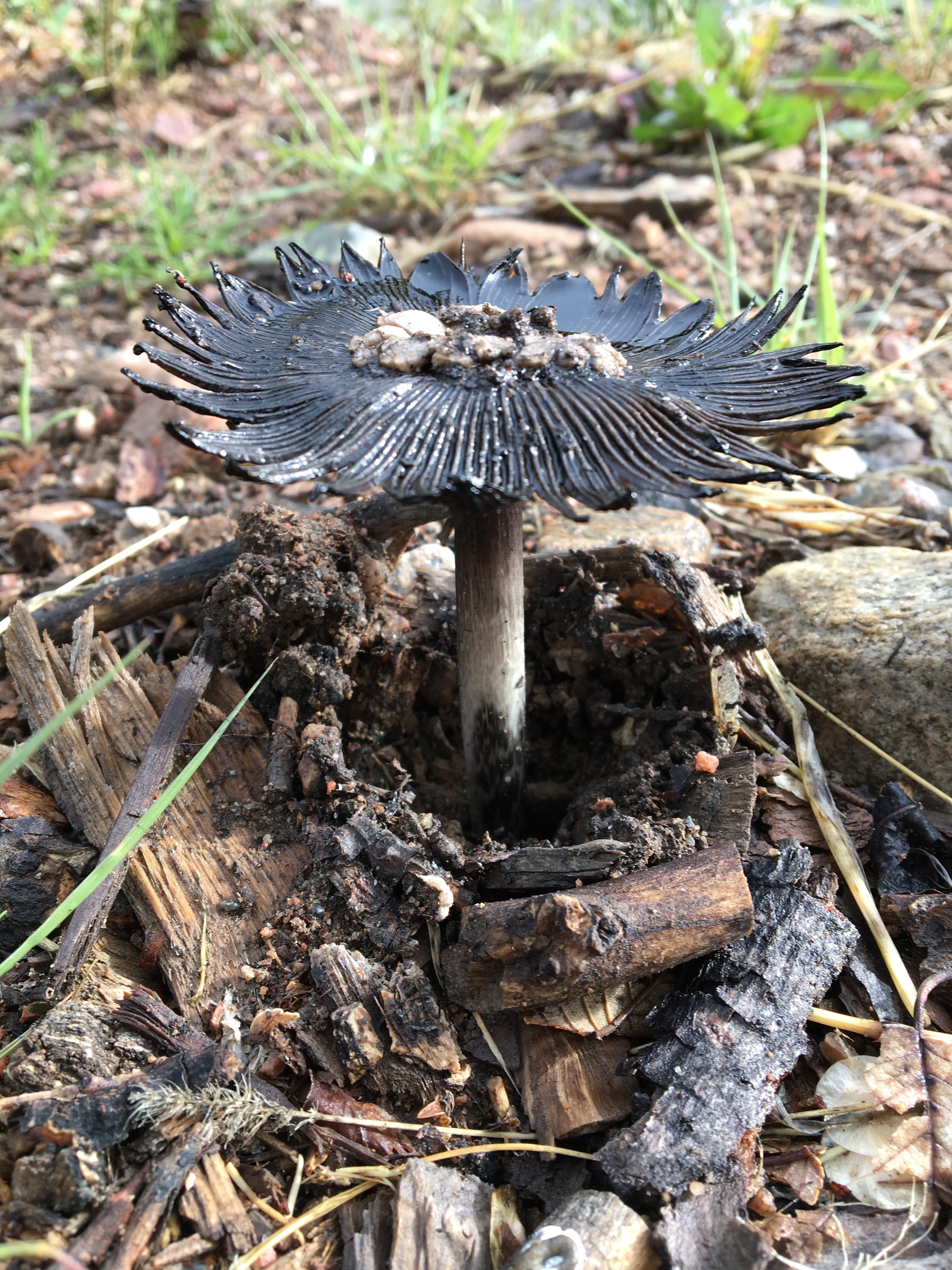

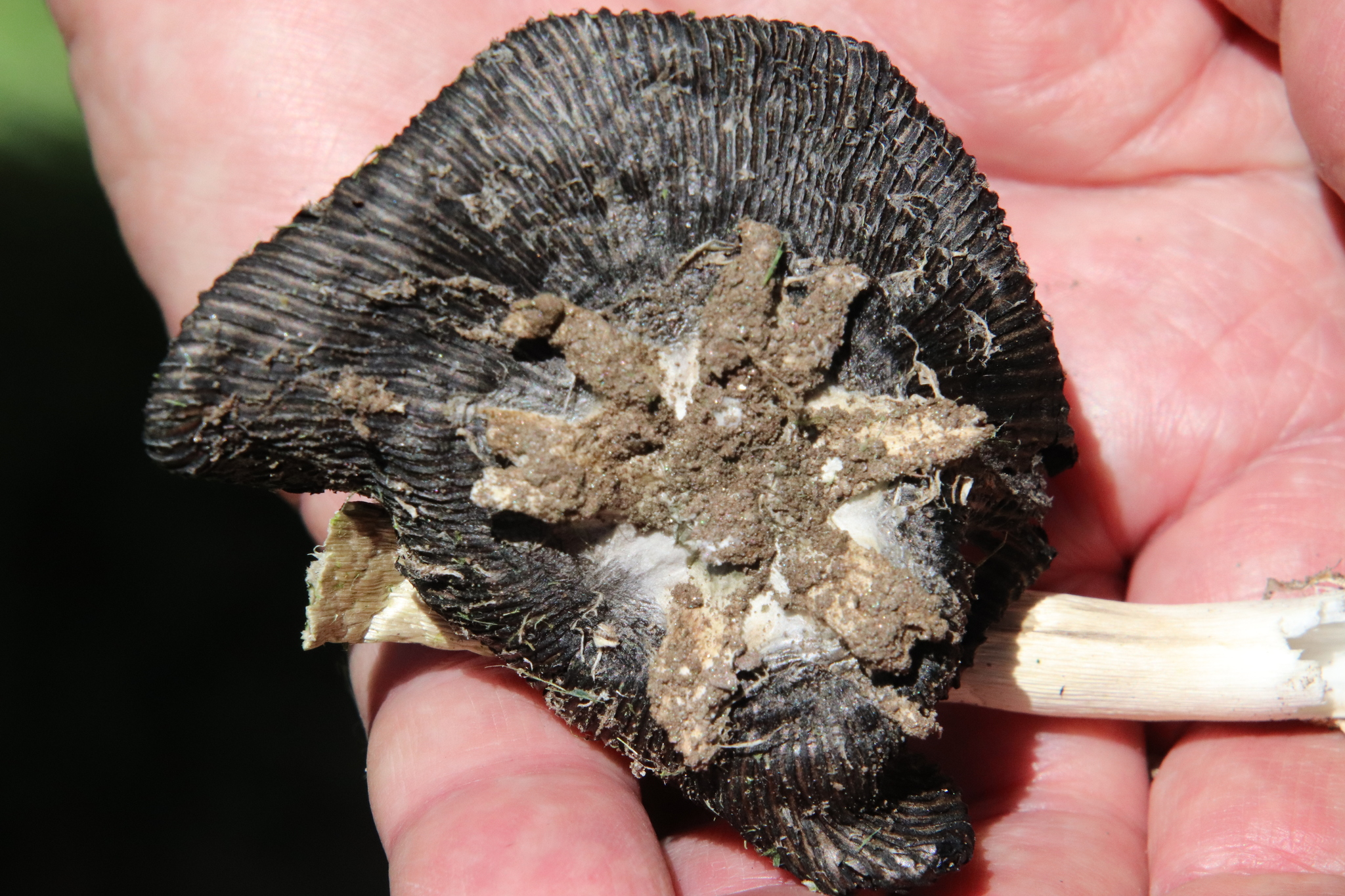

Scientific classification
- Kingdom: Fungi
- Division: Basidiomycota
- Class: Agaricomycetes
- Order: Agaricales
- Family: Agaricaceae
- Genus: Coprinus
- Species: C. calyptratus

Binomial name
- Coprinus calyptratus Peck (1895)

= Coprinus calyptratus =

Species of fungi

Coprinus calyptratus is a species of fungus in the family Agaricaceae. It is commonly known as the star-capped coprinus.

== Taxonomy ==
Coprinus calyptratus was classified by the American mycologist Charles Horton Peck in 1895.

== Description ==
Coprinus calyptratus is a small inkcap mushroom with white flesh and a distinctive star shaped veil remnant on the cap.

Cap: 4-6cm. Starts egg shaped and covered in a veil before expanding to become campanulate which may flatten or curl upwards with age. Gills: Free and crowded soon turning black. Stem: 5-15cm tall. 0.5-1cm in thickness. Lacks a ring and roots in the ground ending in a small basal bulb. Spores: Subellipsoid or subovoid with a large pore. 17-20 x 10-12 μm. Taste: Indistinct. Smell: Indistinct.

== Etymology ==
Coprinus is derived from the Greek kóprinos meaning full of dung. Calyptratus derives from the Latin calyptra meaning covered seed capsules. This in reference to remnants of the universal veil which remain on the cap as scales which Peck described as calyptra.

== Habitat and distribution ==
Coprinus calyptratus is found primarily on the West Coast of the United States.

It is found on sandy soil which has been disturbed in which the bulbous base of the deep rooting stem may be hidden. It is slightly smaller than the well known Coprinus comatus and has a star shaped patch of universal veil remnant in the centre of the cap.
