= Leucocoprinus thoenii =

Scientific classification
- Domain: Eukaryota
- Kingdom: Fungi
- Division: Basidiomycota
- Class: Agaricomycetes
- Order: Agaricales
- Family: Agaricaceae
- Genus: Leucocoprinus
- Species: L. thoenii

Binomial name
- Leucocoprinus thoenii Heinem. (1977)

Species of fungus

Leucocoprinus thoenii is a species of mushroom producing fungus in the family Agaricaceae.

== Taxonomy ==
It was first described in 1977 by the Belgian mycologist Paul Heinemann who classified it as Leucocoprinus thoenii.

Heinemann notes that this species may be the same as Lepiota elongata which the Belgian mycologist Maurice Beeli had annotated an illustration with but never formally classified.

== Description ==
Leucocoprinus thoenii is a small yellow dapperling mushroom. Heinemann provided only a basic description of the features species based on a dried specimen provided by D. Thoen and an observation logged with the Meise Botanic Garden by M. Goossens-Fontana in 1939 which Beeli had annotated with a suggested name.

Cap: Entirely yellow and bulbous at first, expanding and spreading out as it matures. It is covered in small scales (furfuraceous) and striated at the edges of the cap to around three quarters of the way up. Gills: Free, collared. Light ochre upon drying. Stem: Slender and also furfuraceous. Spores: Amygdaliform. 11.4-16 x 8.4-10 μm. The mushroom is described as drying brown.

== Habitat and distribution ==
L. thoenii is scarcely recorded and little known. GBIF records only two observations of this species in the Democratic Republic of the Congo with one at Binga in 1939 and the other at Kipopo in 1973.

== Similar species ==
Due to the lack of documentation and study of this species it is possible that in time it may be classified a synonym for another similar looking Leucocoprinus species. A 1982 study conducted at the University of Michigan by the mycologists Helen Vandervort Smith and Nancy S. Weber noted that L. thoenii is similar to Leucocoprinus magnicystidosus and Leucocoprinus fragilissimus but has larger spores and differences in cellular features.

== Etymology ==
The specific epithet thoenii is named for D. Thoen.
