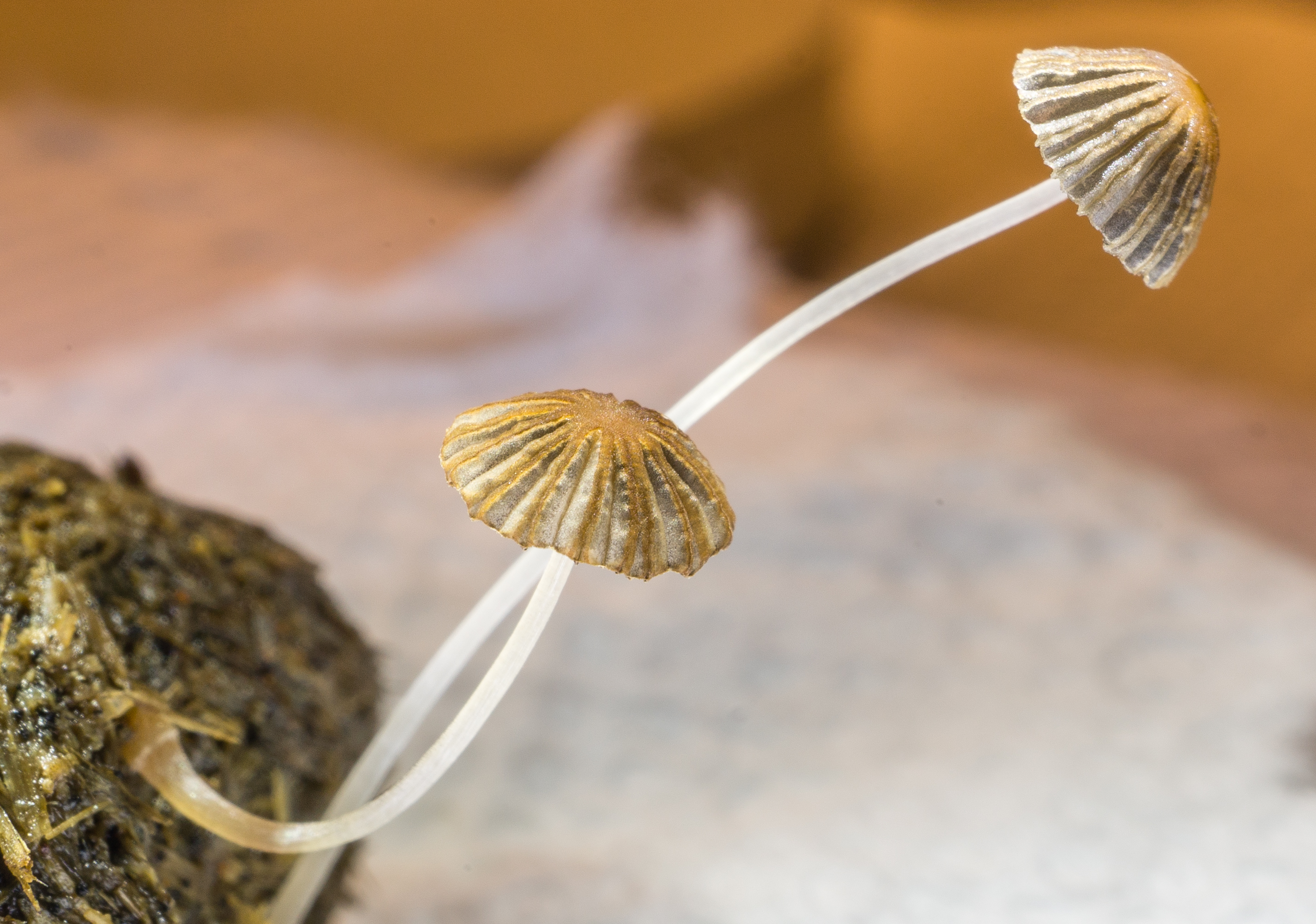

Scientific classification
- Domain: Eukaryota
- Kingdom: Fungi
- Division: Basidiomycota
- Class: Agaricomycetes
- Order: Agaricales
- Family: Psathyrellaceae
- Genus: Parasola
- Species: P. misera

Binomial name
- Parasola misera (P.Karst.) Redhead, Vilgalys & Hopple (2001)

Synonyms
- Coprinus miser P.Karst.; Coprinus miser f. marasmioides Romagn.; Coprinus subtilis; Parasola miser (P.Karst.) Redhead, Vilgalys & Hopple; Parasola misera f. marasmioides (Romagn.) Lécuru

= Parasola misera =

Species of fungus

Parasola misera is a species of coprophilous fungus in the family Psathyrellaceae. It grows on the dung of goats and possibly on that of sheep.
