= Leucocoprinus magnicystidiosus =

Scientific classification
- Kingdom: Fungi
- Division: Basidiomycota
- Class: Agaricomycetes
- Order: Agaricales
- Family: Agaricaceae
- Genus: Leucocoprinus
- Species: L. magnicystidiosus

Binomial name
- Leucocoprinus magnicystidiosus H.V.Sm. & N.S.Weber (1982)

Species of fungus

Leucocoprinus magnicystidiosus
- Mycological characteristics
- Gills on hymenium
- Cap is campanulate or conical
- Hymenium is free
- Stipe has a ring
- Spore print is white
- Ecology is saprotrophic
- Edibility is unknown

Leucocoprinus magnicystidiosus is a species of mushroom-producing fungus in the family Agaricaceae.

== Taxonomy ==
It was first described in 1982 by the mycologists Helen Vandervort Smith and Nancy S. Weber who classified it as Leucocoprinus magnicystidiosus. The specimens studied and documented were collected by Ervin Hillhouse in 1971.

== Description ==
Leucocoprinus magnicystidiosus is a dapperling mushroom with extremely fragile white flesh.

Cap: 4–8cm wide when mature. Up to 1.3cm wide and 3.2cm high when young. Starts bulbous and expands to conical or campanulate (bell shaped) before flattening or becoming concave with the cap edges lifting upwards. The surface is bright lemon yellow with a brown centre when young. The cap edges have striate or plicate striations which extend nearly to the centre, the striations remain bright yellow whilst the grooves between them are white. The cap is very fragile at all stages of growth and easily sticks to the fingers and tears when examined. Stem: 7–15cm tall and 2.4mm thick. Roughly equal in width above the bulbous base. Yellow coloured, sometimes darker than the cap and sometimes with red or brown shades. Fragile and sometimes breaking naturally under the weight of the cap. The stem ring is yellow below and white above but may disappear quickly with only fragments remaining on the stem and cap margin. Gills: Yellow to white but paler than the top of the cap. Spores: Ovate to lemon shaped with a distinct pore. Dextrinoid. 9.0–13.5 x 7.5–9.0 μm. Basidia: 20–39 x 10–12μm. Four spored. Smell: Indistinct. Taste: Slightly bitter.

This mushroom is described as being 'extremely fragile'. The stem is so fragile that when the caps are fully open and mature even a slight breeze or human breath can cause them to break. Larger specimens may collapse under their own weight and hot sun causes these mushrooms to deteriorate and disappear very quickly. So on hot days they are only ever found in the early morning. Dried specimens present with a dark red tint across the centre of the cap and the striations.

== Habitat and distribution ==
L. magnicystidiosus is scarcely recorded and little known. The specimens studied were gathered in Brazoria county, Texas in 1971 and Cades Cove, Tennessee in 1939. The later collection was described as growing in the Summer and Autumn and was found growing in scattered clusters amongst St. Augustine grass and pine. Specimens were also found growing from the soil in mixed woodland, in layers of fallen pine needles and in leaf covered grass. The mushrooms were described as being very abundant at times but fleeting and found only during and shortly after rain or in the early morning when heavy dew was present.

== Similar species ==
- Leucocoprinus fragilissimus usually has a smaller cap (2–5cm), brighter colours and has microscopic features which distinguish it from L. magnicystidiosus.
- Leucocoprinus thoenii is described as looking similar and being separated by microscopic detail. However it is found in Africa.
