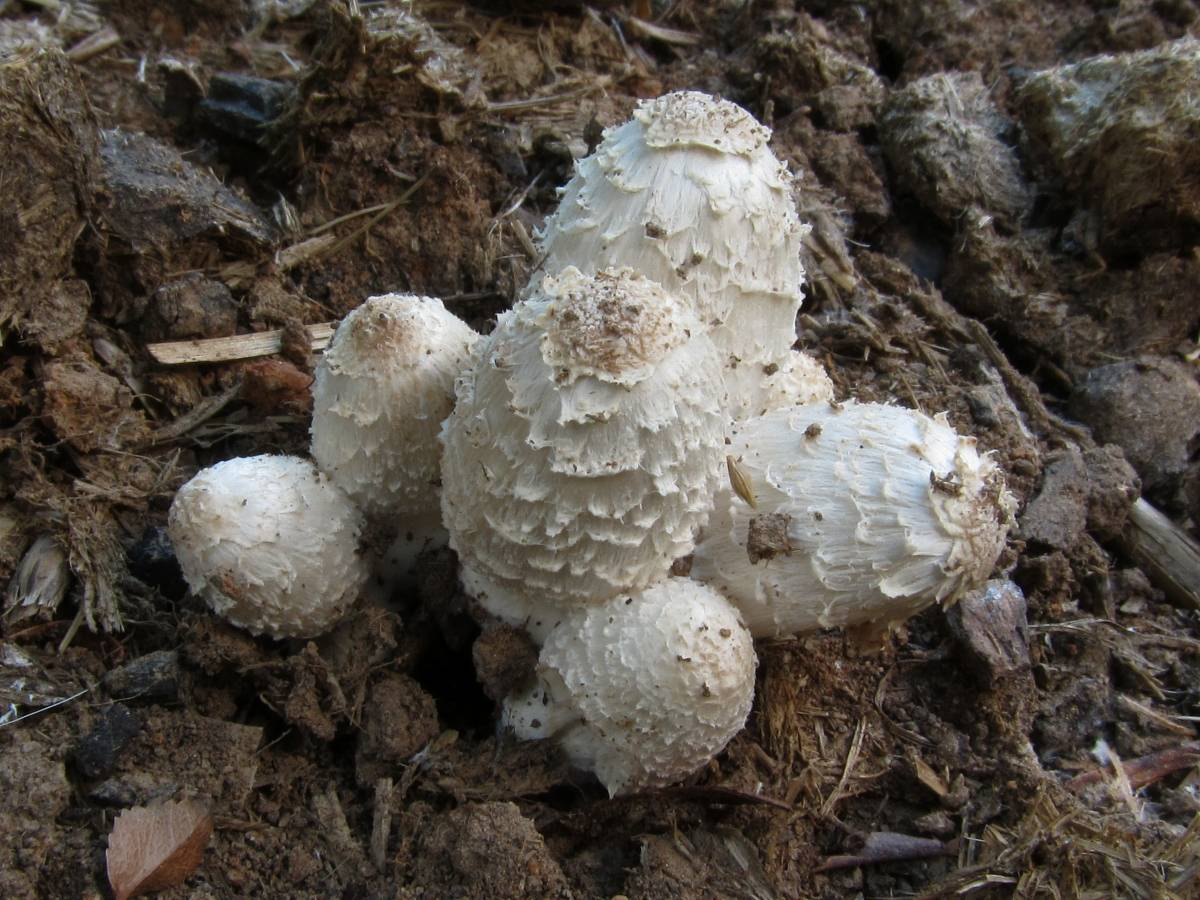

Scientific classification
- Kingdom: Fungi
- Division: Basidiomycota
- Class: Agaricomycetes
- Order: Agaricales
- Family: Agaricaceae
- Genus: Coprinus
- Species: C. sterquilinus

Binomial name
- Coprinus sterquilinus (Fries) Fries

= Coprinus sterquilinus =

Species of fungus

Coprinus sterquilinus
- Mycological characteristics
- Gills on hymenium
- Cap is conical or ovate
- Hymenium is seceding
- Stipe has a ring
- Spore print is black
- Ecology is saprotrophic

Coprinus sterquilinus, the midden ink cap, is a species of fungus in the family Agaricaceae. It grows on animal dung and occurs in Europe, Asia, Australia and America.

== Description ==
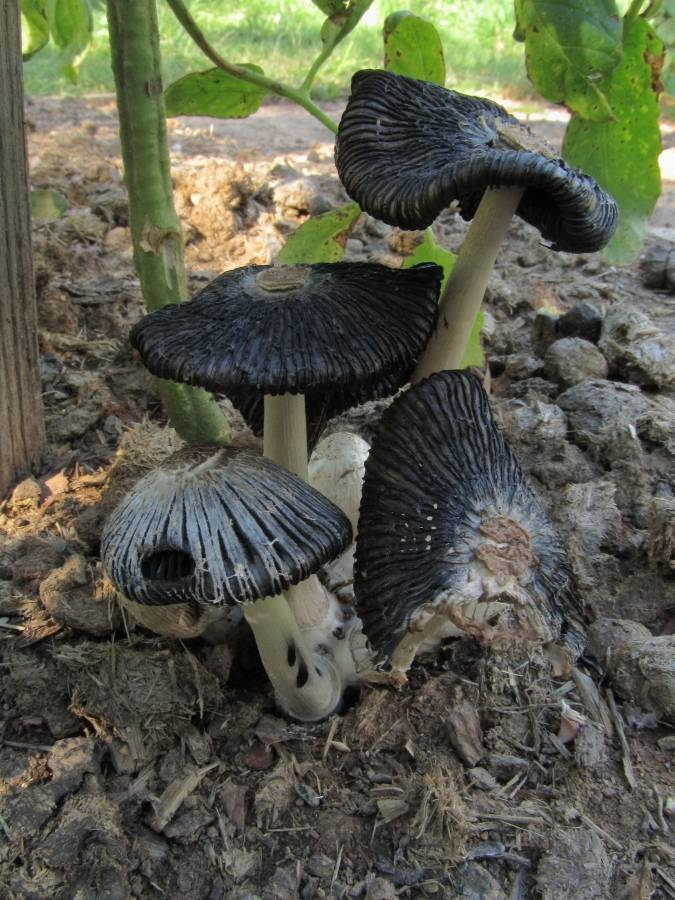
This species becomes black as it matures and soon autodigests.

C. sterquilinus has an ellipsoid or ovoid cap, some 40 to 60 millimetres (1.6 to 2.4 in) by 20 to 30 millimetres (0.8 to 1.2 in) when closed, becoming conical and then flattening out to a width of 60 millimetres (2.4 in). It is white, flocculous and fibrillose when young, becoming more scaly with a creamy centre as it matures. There are more than fifty gills, white at first, turning to grey and then black. The stipe or stem is slender, 80 to 150 millimetres (3 to 6 in) tall, with a moveable ring just above the slightly bulbous base. The spores are ellipsoid and very large at 17–26 by 10–15 μm, very dark reddish-brown to black.

== Distribution and habitat ==
The species has an extensive range in Europe, Asia and America, but is uncommon. It grows in dung and on manure heaps, particularly on horse manure.

== Biology ==
Coprinus sterquilinus is closely related to the shaggy ink cap (Coprinus comatus). Both share the characteristic of the genus to autodigest; starting at the base of the gills, the spores develop and discharge, and the discharged basidia and the supporting hyphae produce enzymes which dissolve the tissues, and these drip from the base of the gills as a black liquid (which can be used as ink).

== Research ==
The stipe is a hollow cylinder with thin walls. It is slender and rather brittle but is strong in its longitudinal axis. This can be seen in the way that the cap is pushed through dung or even asphalt, and the caps scarcely sway, even in a gale. In an experiment, one fruit body lifted 204 g (7.2 oz), giving an upward pressure of the stipe of two thirds of an atmosphere. This pressure is generated by the turgor pressure of the cells forming the thin walls of the stipe.
