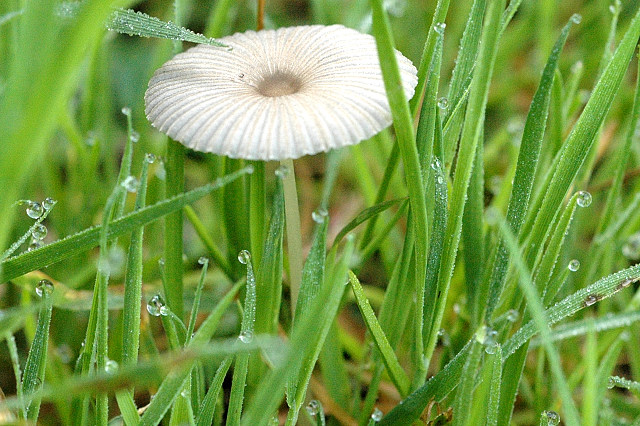

Scientific classification
- Domain: Eukaryota
- Kingdom: Fungi
- Division: Basidiomycota
- Class: Agaricomycetes
- Order: Agaricales
- Family: Psathyrellaceae
- Genus: Parasola
- Species: P. plicatilis

Binomial name
- Parasola plicatilis (Curtis) Redhead et al.

= Parasola plicatilis =

Pleated inkcap

Species of fungus

Parasola plicatilis Mycological characteristics
- Gills on hymenium
- Cap is convex or depressed
- Hymenium is free
- Stipe is bare
- Spore print is black
- Ecology is saprotrophic
- Edibility is inedible

Parasola plicatilis, commonly known as the pleated inkcap, is a small saprotrophic mushroom.

The body resembles a cocktail umbrella. The plicate cap is up to 3.5 centimetres (1 1/2 in) wide. The species has no veil. Though nonpoisonous, the species is generally regarded as inedible and thin-fleshed.

Two related species, P. hemerobia and P. leiocephala, have similar microscopic features but appear in different habitats and have unique spores. Other lookalikes include Leucocoprinus fragilissimus and members of Coprinopsis, Narcissea, and Tulosesus.

P. plicatilis is a widely distributed species in Europe and North America. It is a decomposer which can be found in grassy areas, alone, scattered or in small groups. The fruiting bodies grow at night after rain, and will self decompose after spore dispersion is achieved. Otherwise, they are quickly dried up in morning sunlight, or will eventually collapse beneath the weight of their caps.
