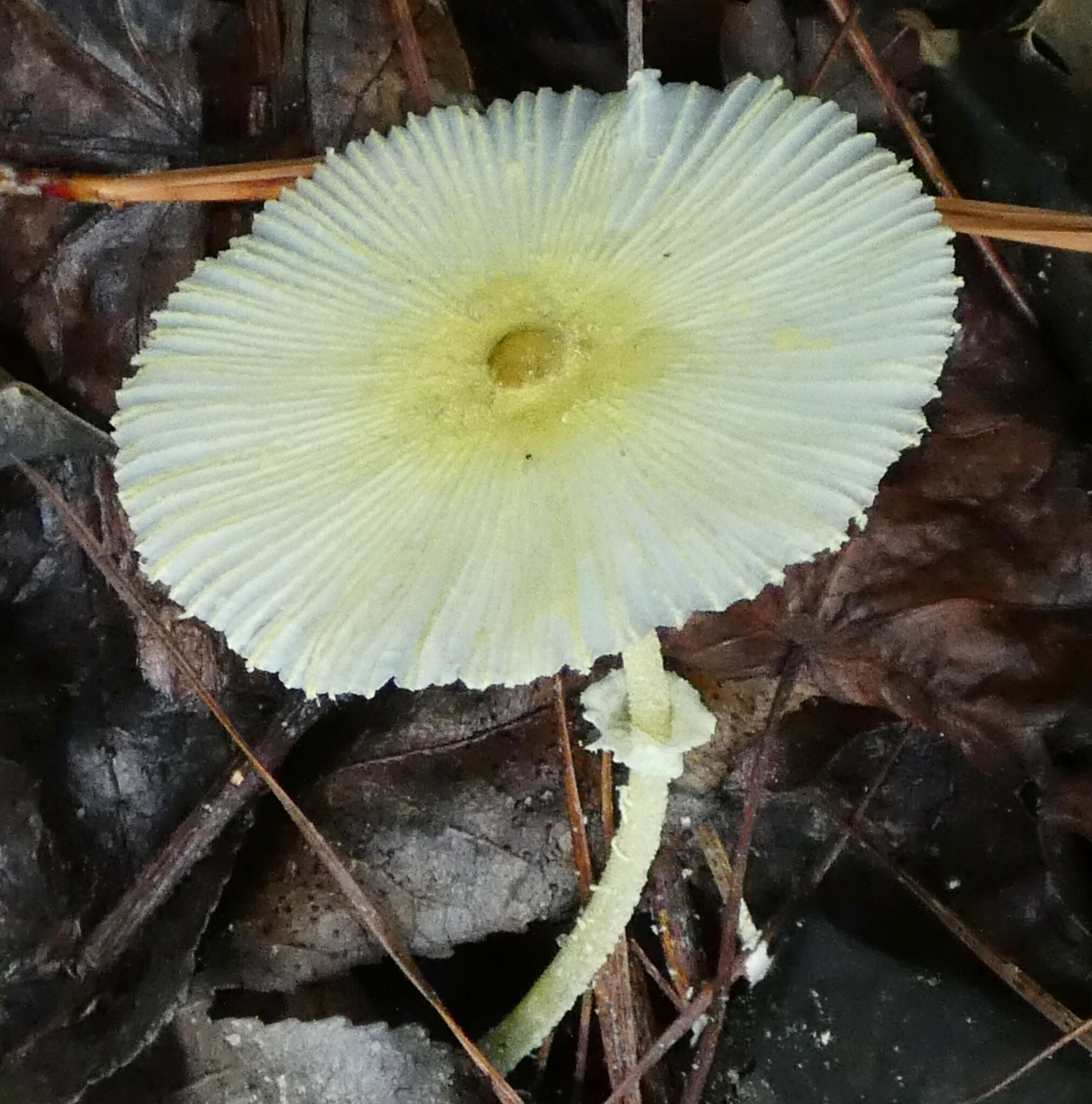

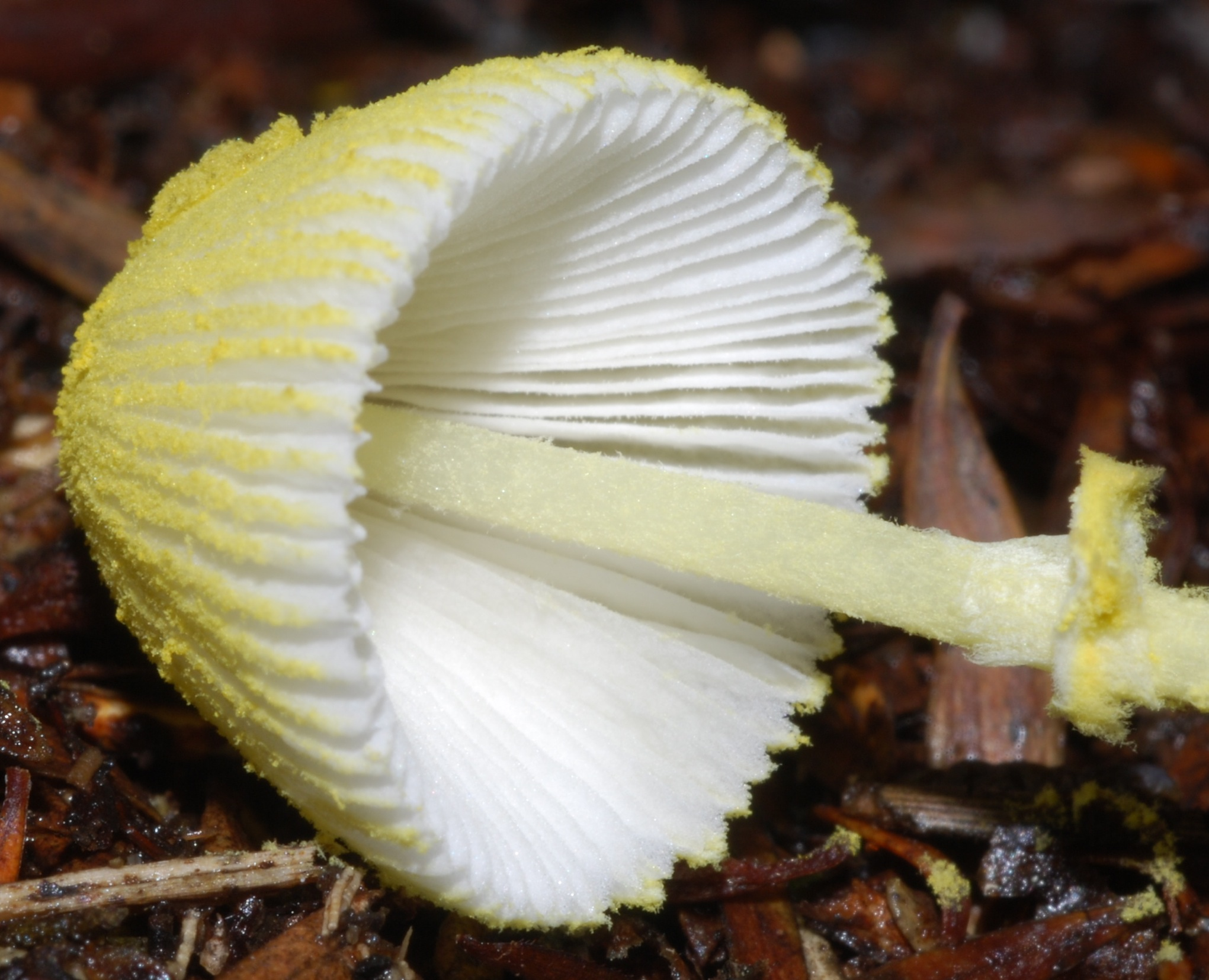

Scientific classification
- Kingdom: Fungi
- Division: Basidiomycota
- Class: Agaricomycetes
- Order: Agaricales
- Family: Agaricaceae
- Genus: Leucocoprinus
- Species: L. fragilissimus

Binomial name
- Leucocoprinus fragilissimus (Ravenel ex Berk & M.A. Curtis) Pat. (1900)

Synonyms
- Agaricus flammula Alb. & Schwein. (1805); Agaricus licmophorus Berk & Broome (1871); Hiatula fragilissima Ravenel ex Berk & M.A. Curtis (1853); Hiatula licmophora Petch -1910] Lepiota flammula Gillet [1878] Lepiota fragilissima Morgan (1907); Lepiota licmophora Sacc (1887); Leucocoprinus licmophorus Pat. (1913); Mastocephalus licmophorus Kuntze (1891); Pholiota flammula Miq. (1912)

= Leucocoprinus fragilissimus =

Species of fungus

Leucocoprinus fragilissimus
- Mycological characteristics
- Gills on hymenium
- Cap is campanulate or convex
- Hymenium is free
- Stipe has a ring
- Spore print is white
- Ecology is saprotrophic

Leucocoprinus fragilissimus, commonly known as the fragile dapperling, is a species of gilled mushroom in the family Agaricaceae.

== Taxonomy ==
As with many of the most well known Leucocoprinus species the taxonomic history of this species is complex with numerous early mycologists classifying it independently before the species were later merged. As a result, the authorities recognised today aren't necessarily the first to document this species but rather the first to document the basionym which ultimately ended up classified as Leucocoprinus fragilissimus.

The first description of this species was made in 1805 by Johannes Baptista von Albertini and Lewis David de Schweinitz who classified it as Agaricus flammula. This basionym was reclassified as Lepiota flammula in 1874 by the French botanist Claude Casimir Gillet and then Pholiota flammula in 1912 by the Italian mycologist Vincenzo Migliozzi.

In 1853 Hiatula fragilissima was described by the British botanist Miles Joseph Berkeley and the American botanist Moses Ashley Curtis based on an earlier unofficial classification by the American botanist Henry William Ravenel. In 1907 the American mycologist Andrew Price Morgan reclassified the species as Lepiota fragilissima however it had already been reclassified as Leucocoprinus fragilissimus in 1900 by Patouillard.

In addition to these basionyms, in 1871 Agaricus licmophorus was described by Berkeley and the British mycologist Christopher Edmund Broome. An illustration of this species was included in Mordecai Cubitt Cooke's 'Illustrations of British Fungi' published between 1881 and 1891. It was reclassified as Lepiota licmophora by the Italian mycologist Pier Andrea Saccardo in 1887 and then Mastocephalus licmophorus by the German botanist Otto Kunze in his extensive proposed list of reclassifications of 1891. However Kunze's Mastocephalus genus, along with most of 'Revisio generum plantarum' was not widely accepted by the scientific community of the age so it remained a Lepiota and no species remain within the Mastocephalus genus.

In 1888 the French mycologist Narcisse Théophile Patouillard described the novel species Leucocoprinus flavipes which Saccardo reclassified as Hiatula flavipes in 1891 citing Hiatula fragilissimoe as a similar species. In 1910 the British mycologist Thomas Petch reclassified this species as Hiatula licmophora and stated that it was probable that it was identical to Leucocoprinus flavipes and Hiatula fragilissima. Nonetheless H. licmophora was finally reclassified as Leucocoprinus licmophorus by Patouillard in 1913. In 1972 this was reclassified as Leucocoprinus fragilissimus by the British mycologist David Pegler.

This confusing history full of competing names is typical of many of the Leucocoprinus species documented from greenhouses and plant pots since the mushrooms started appearing all over Europe after exotic plants were brought back from the tropics. With only written descriptions and illustrations to compare as well as the slow rate of information dissemination that came from printed journals it is to be expected that these species were originally described numerous times.

== Description ==
Leucocoprinus fragilissimus is a small dapperling mushroom with very thin, extremely fragile, yellow flesh.

Cap: 2–4.5 cm wide, convex expanding to almost flat with a small central disc or umbo. The surface is pale greenish yellow with a darker centre but it fades to nearly white with a yellowish centre. Gills: Free, distant and pale yellow.

Stem: 4–9 cm long and 1-2mm thick running equally down to a small, very slightly bulbous base. The stem is extremely fragile with a surface that is pale yellow and smooth but also fades to nearly white. The yellow stem ring is located towards the middle of the stem (median) but is likewise fragile and may disappear. The spore print is white. Spores: Ellipsoid with a large pore. Dextrinoid. 9–12 x 7–8 μm. The smell is indistinct.

=== Similar species ===
- Leucocoprinus magnicystidiosus is a similar mushroom, with a darker disc and larger cheilocystidia.
- Bolbitius titubans is often mistaken with Leucocoprinus fragilissimus as the caps can appear superficially similar when mature. It is easily distinguished by the gill colour however.
- Various species in the Psathyrellacea family, especially Parasola species are often confused with L. fragilissimus based on similar cap appearance.

== Habitat and distribution ==
Like all Leucocoprinus species, L. fragilissimus is a saprotroph, living on very decayed plant matter (humus or compost). It grows individually or sparsely in wooded areas. The species is found in southern North America, South America, southern Europe, Africa, southern and eastern Asia, Australia, and New Zealand.

In 1867 the Belgian botanist Jean Kickx documented Agaricus flammula growing in tanbark in the greenhouses of the Ghent Botanical garden during August and September.

In 1871 Berkeley and Broome described Lepiota licmophorus from Peradeniya, Sri Lanka (then known as Ceylon) where it was found growing on the ground. Many of their observations were conducted in this area so it is possible that they were in or around the vicinity of the Royal Botanical Gardens, Peradeniya, which were founded in 1843. They noted that it was also found in their hothouses and concluded it was likely introduced into them with the exotic plants.

In 1874 Gillet described Lepiota flammula from France where they were observed growing in small tufts of 3-4 mushrooms in greenhouses in the Summer and Autumn.

In 1907 Morgan documented Lepiota fragilissima growing on earth and decayed vegetation on the edges of swamps in South Carolina where it was found individually and in groups.

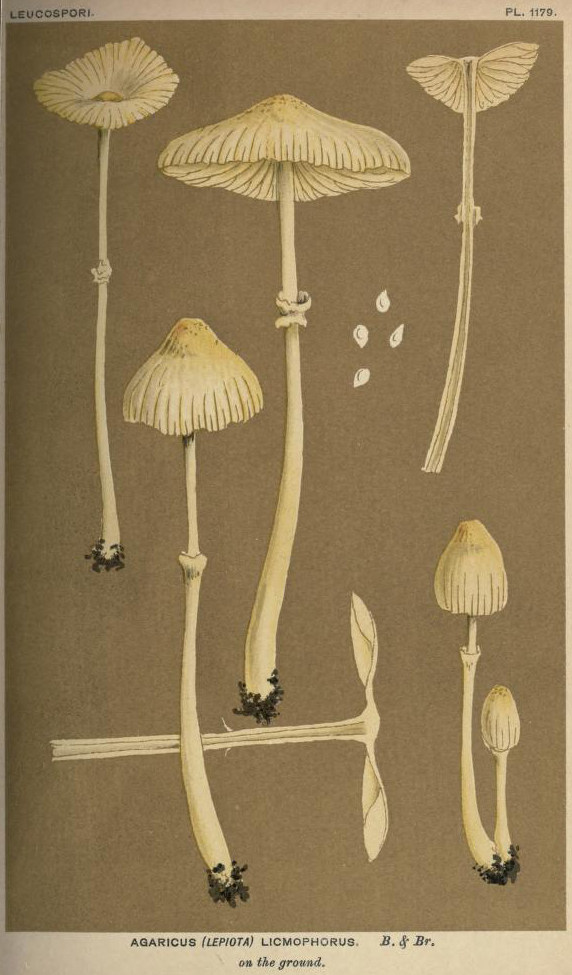
M.C.Cooke's illustration, 1881 - 1891
