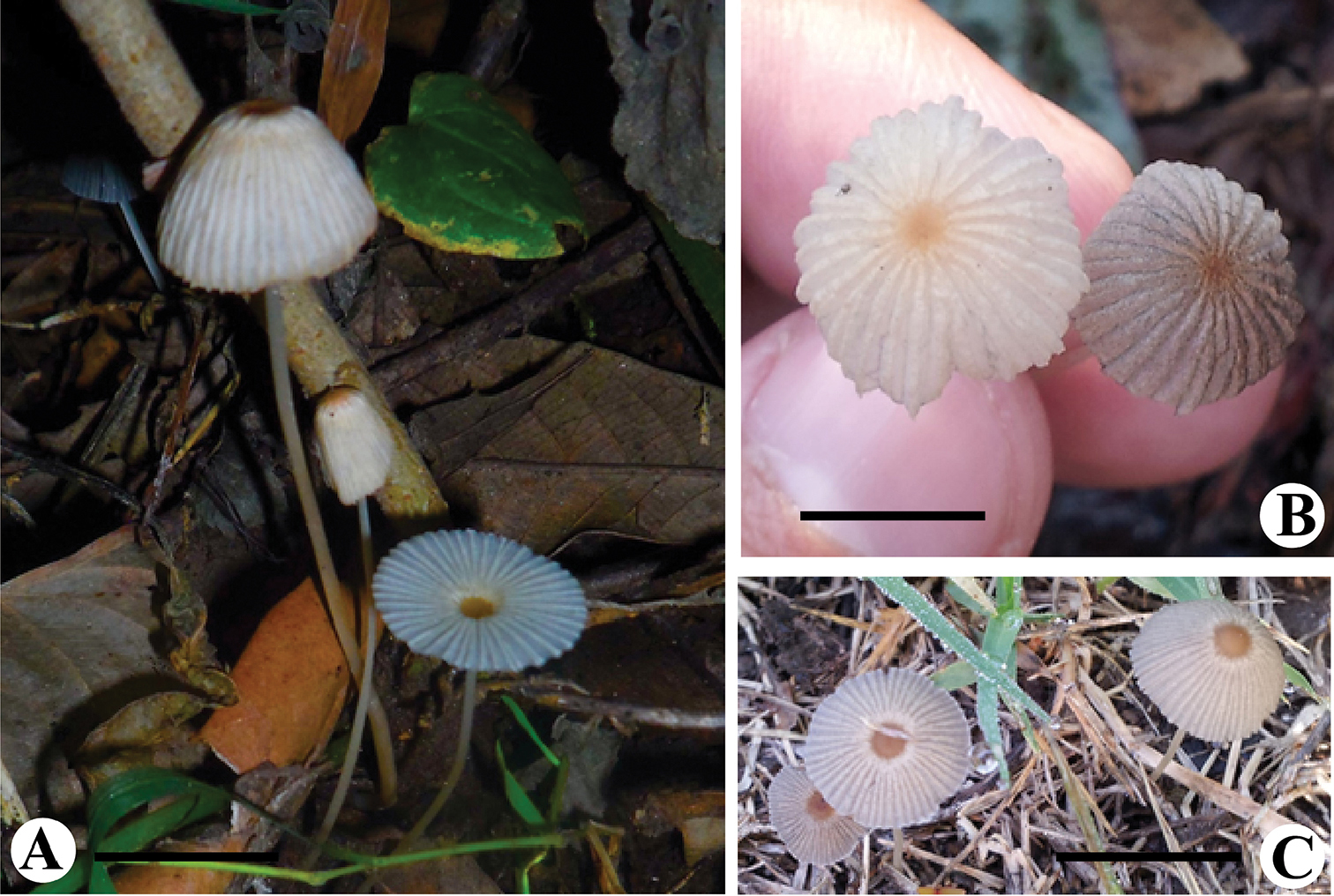
- Parasola sp.

Scientific classification
- Kingdom: Fungi
- Division: Basidiomycota
- Class: Agaricomycetes
- Order: Agaricales
- Family: Psathyrellaceae
- Genus: Parasola; Redhead, Vilgalys & Hopple (2001)

Type species
- Parasola plicatilis (Curtis) Redhead, Vilgalys & Hopple (2001)

Species
- see text

= Parasola =

Genus of fungi

Parasola is a genus of coprinoid mushrooms in the family Psathyrellaceae. These small frail fungi have translucent caps where the radiating gills look like the spokes of a parasol (except for P. conopilea which was recently added to the genus). In the past these mushrooms were classified under Coprinus, but unlike that genus there is no veil and the caps do not break down into inky fluid, but curl up and wither as they age. Species in this genus are commonly known as umbrella inky caps.

== Species ==
The following species are recognised in the genus Parasola:

- Parasola aporos (Courtec.) E.F. Malysheva (2019)
- Parasola auricoma (Pat.) Redhead, Vilgalys & Hopple (2001)
- Parasola besseyi (A.H. Sm.) Redhead, Vilgalys & Hopple (2001)
- Parasola bogartii Voto (2021)
- Parasola brunneola (McKnight) Redhead, Vilgalys & Hopple (2001)
- Parasola cinnamomescens Z. Khan, M.A. Arshad, Niazi & Khalid (2023)
- Parasola conopila (Fr.) Örstadius & E. Larss. (2008)
- Parasola crataegi Schmidt-Stohn (2017)
- Parasola cuniculorum D.J. Schaf. (2014)
- Parasola cystistipitata Voto (2021)
- Parasola elwhaensis Voto (2021)
- Parasola galericuliformis (Losa ex Watling) Redhead, Vilgalys & Hopple (2001)
- Parasola glabra S. Hussain, Afshan, H. Ahmad & Khalid (2018)
- Parasola grgurinoviciae P. Voto (2019)
- Parasola hawaiiana P. Voto (2019)
- Parasola hemerobia (Fr.) Redhead, Vilgalys & Hopple (2001)
- Parasola hercules (Uljé & Bas) Redhead, Vilgalys & Hopple (2001)
- Parasola kuehneri (Uljé & Bas) Redhead, Vilgalys & Hopple (2001)
- Parasola lactea (A.H. Sm.) Redhead, Vilgalys & Hopple (2001)
- Parasola leiocephala (P.D. Orton) Redhead, Vilgalys & Hopple (2001)
- Parasola lilatincta (Bender & Uljé) Redhead, Vilgalys & Hopple (2001)
- Parasola lilatinctoides P. Voto (2019)
- Parasola litoralis Loizides, D.J. Schaf. & P. Alvarado (2022)
- Parasola malakandensis S. Hussain, Afshan & H. Ahmad (2017)
- Parasola megasperma (P.D. Orton) Redhead, Vilgalys & Hopple (2001)
- Parasola mirabilis (Mont.) Redhead, Vilgalys & Hopple (2001)
- Parasola misera (P. Karst.) Redhead, Vilgalys & Hopple (2001)
- Parasola nudiceps (P.D. Orton) Redhead, Vilgalys & Hopple (2001)
- Parasola ochracea L. Nagy, Szarkándi & Dima (2017)
- Parasola pachytera (Berk. & Broome) Redhead, Vilgalys & Hopple (2001)
- Parasola pallidifusca Voto (2021)
- Parasola papillatospora Tkalčec, Mešić, Pošta, I. Kušan & Čerkez (2023)
- Parasola parvula Ganga & Manimohan (2018)
- Parasola plicatilis (Curtis) Redhead, Vilgalys & Hopple (2001)
- Parasola plicatilis-similis L. Nagy, Szarkándi & Dima (2017)
- Parasola plicatilopsis P. Voto (2019)
- Parasola psathyrelloides K.G.G. Ganga & Manim. (2019)
- Parasola pseudolactea Sadiqullah, S. Hussain & Khalid (2018)
- Parasola schroeteri (P. Karst.) Redhead, Vilgalys & Hopple (2001)
- Parasola setulosa (Berk. & Broome) Redhead, Vilgalys & Hopple (2001)
- Parasola subprona (Cleland) J.A. Simpson & Grgur. (2001)
- Parasola virgulacolens (Cleland) J.A. Simpson & Grgur. (2001)
