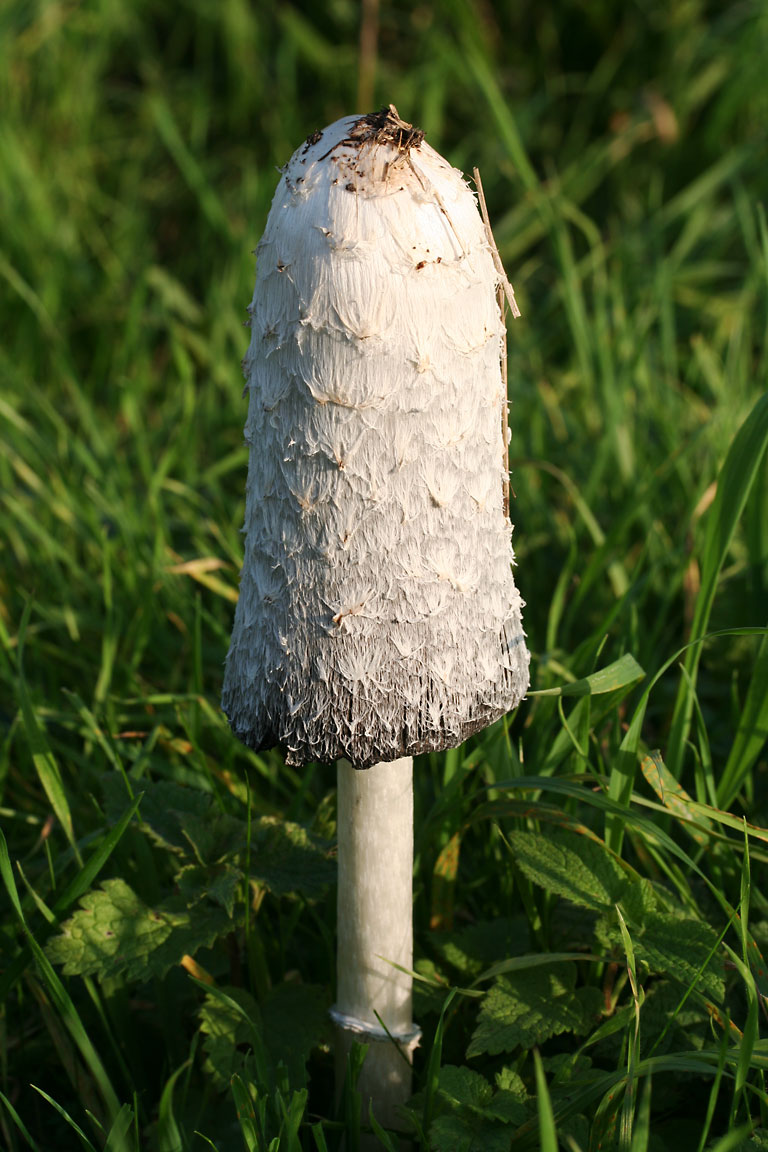
- Coprinus comatus

Scientific classification
- Domain: Eukaryota
- Kingdom: Fungi
- Division: Basidiomycota
- Class: Agaricomycetes
- Order: Agaricales
- Family: Agaricaceae
- Genus: Coprinus; Pers. (1797)

Type species
- Coprinus comatus (O.F.Müll.) Gray (1797)

Synonyms
- Annularius Roussel (1806); Onchopus P.Karst. (1879); Pselliophora P.Karst. (1879); Ephemerocybe Fayod (1889); Lentispora Fayod (1889); Pseudocoprinus Kühner (1928); Coprinusella (Peck) Zerov (1979)

= Coprinus =

Genus of fungi

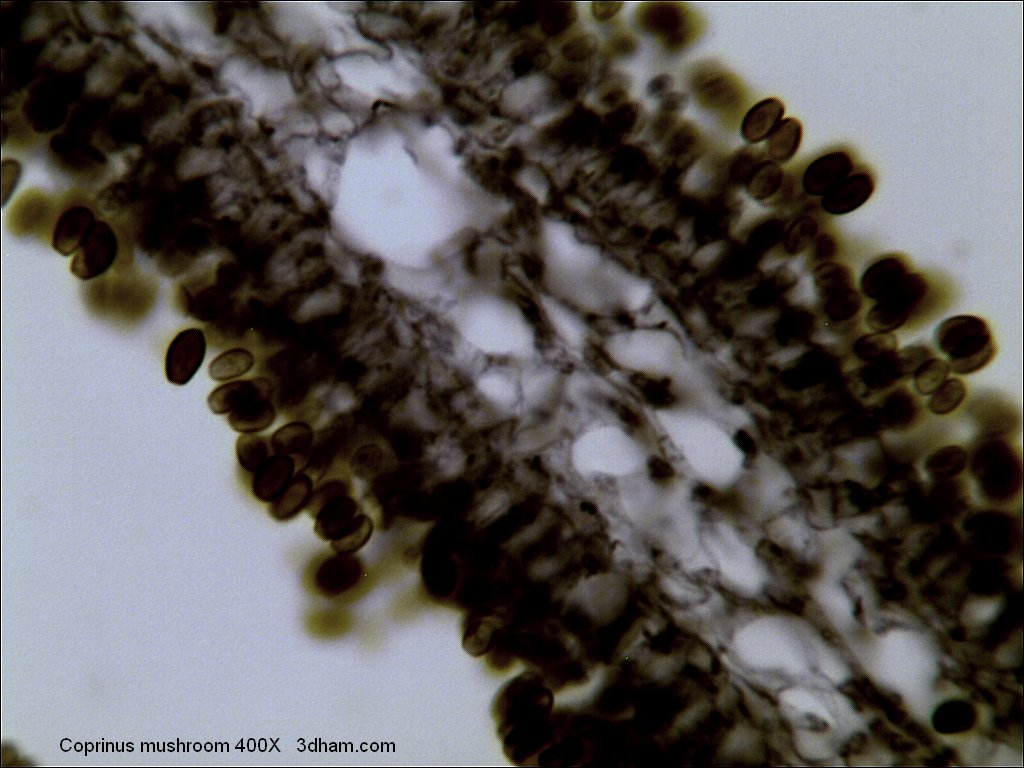
Cross-section of a Coprinus mushroom gill, showing basidia (magnified 400×)

Coprinus is a small genus of mushroom-forming fungi consisting of Coprinus comatus—the shaggy ink cap (British) or shaggy mane (American)—and several of its close relatives. Until 2001, Coprinus was a large genus consisting of all agaric species in which the lamellae autodigested to release their spores. The black ink-like liquid this creates gave these species their common name "ink cap" (British) or "inky cap" (American).

Molecular phylogenetic investigation found that Coprinus comatus was only a distant relative of the other members of Coprinus, and was closer to genera in the Agaricaceae. Since Coprinus comatus is the type species of Coprinus, only that species and its close relatives C. sterquilinus and C. spadiceisporus retained the name of the genus.

The majority of species of Coprinus were therefore reclassified into three genera placed in Psathyrellaceae: Coprinellus, Coprinopsis, and Parasola. Coprinus and these segregate genera are now referred to collectively as coprinoid fungi.

Coprinus is New Latin, from the Greek koprinos, "of dung", in reference to the habitat of some of the species.

== Species ==
Species of the genus include, but are not limited to:

- Coprinus calyptratus
- Coprinus comatus (shaggy ink cap, shaggy cap, lawyer's wig)
- Coprinus spadiceisporus
- Coprinus sterquilinus

=== Selected former species ===
- Coprinus atramentarius - now Coprinopsis atramentaria (Common inkcap)
- Coprinus micaceus - now Coprinellus micaceus (Mica cap)
- Coprinus plicatilis - now Parasola plicatilis

== See also ==
- List of Agaricales genera
- List of Agaricaceae genera
