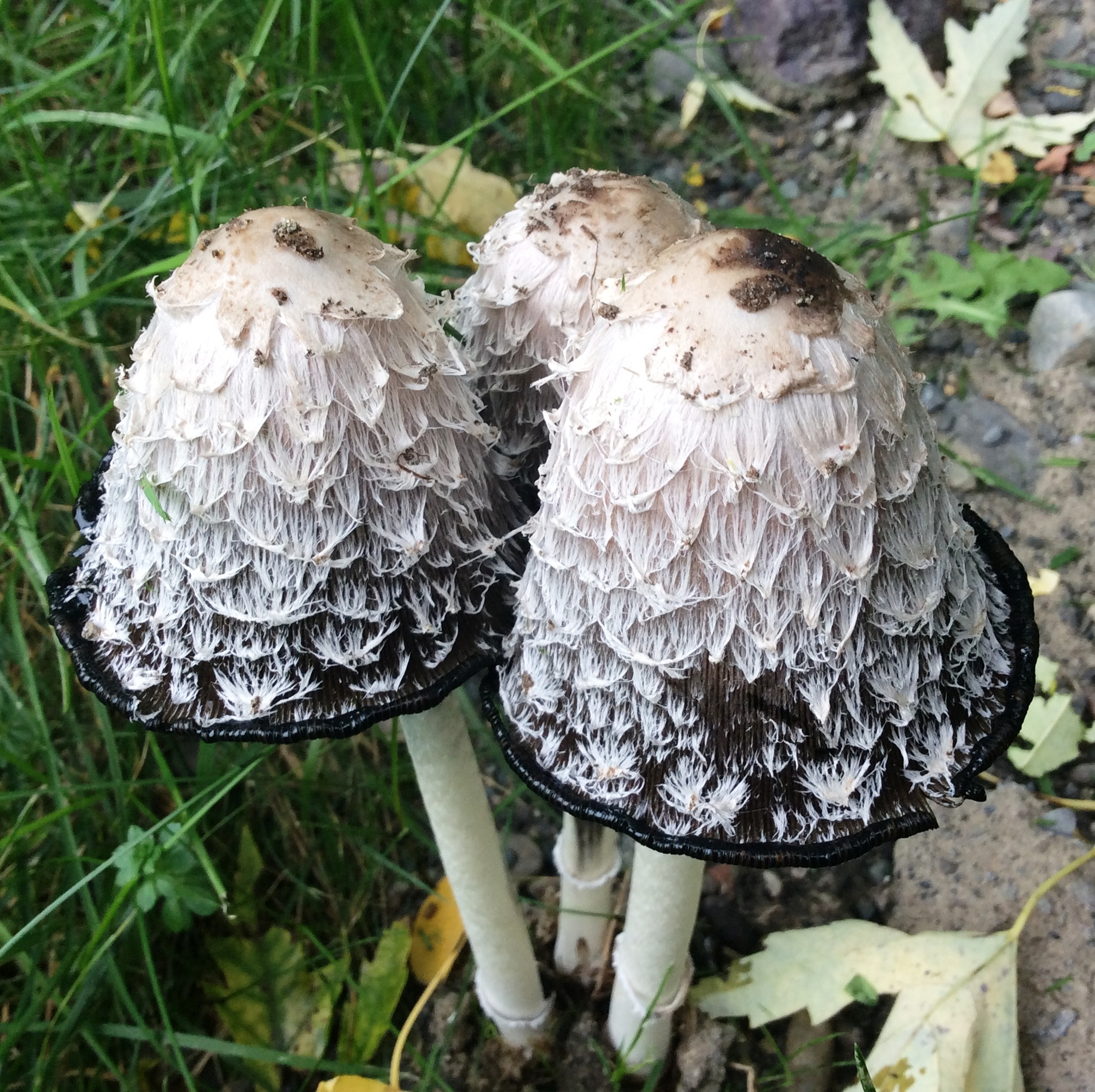

Conservation status
- Least Concern (IUCN 3.1)

Scientific classification
- Kingdom: Fungi
- Division: Basidiomycota
- Class: Agaricomycetes
- Order: Agaricales
- Family: Agaricaceae
- Genus: Coprinus
- Species: C. comatus

Binomial name
- Coprinus comatus (O.F.Müll.) Pers. (1797)

Synonyms
- Agaricus cylindricus Schaeff. (1774); Agaricus comatus O.F.Müll. (1780); Agaricus vaillantii J.F.Gmel. (1792)

= Coprinus comatus =

Species of fungus

Coprinus comatus
- Mycological characteristics
- Gills on hymenium
- Cap is conical
- Hymenium is free
- Stipe has a ring
- Spore print is black
- Ecology is saprotrophic
- Edibility is choice

Coprinus comatus, commonly known as the shaggy ink cap, lawyer's wig, or shaggy mane, is a species of fungus. The young fruit bodies first appear as white cylinders emerging from the ground, then the bell-shaped caps open out. The white caps are covered with scales, the origin of its common names. The gills beneath the cap are white, then pink, then turn black. This mushroom is unusual because it will turn black and dissolve itself in a matter of hours after being picked or depositing spores.

The mushroom is often seen growing about lawns, gravel roads, and waste areas in the Northern Hemisphere and more locally in the Southern Hemisphere. When young it is an excellent edible mushroom but it spoils quickly and resembles some poisonous species.

== Taxonomy ==
The shaggy ink cap was first described by Danish naturalist Otto Friedrich Müller in 1780 as Agaricus comatus, before being given its current binomial name in 1797 by Christiaan Hendrik Persoon. Its specific name derives from coma, or "hair", hence comatus, "hairy" or "shaggy". Other common names include lawyer's wig, and shaggy mane.

Coprinus comatus is the type species for the genus Coprinus. This genus was formerly considered to be a large one with well over 100 species. However, molecular analysis of DNA sequences showed that the former species belonged in two families, the Agaricaceae and the Psathyrellaceae. Coprinus comatus is the best known of the true Coprinus.

== Description ==
The shaggy ink cap is easily recognizable from its almost cylindrical cap which initially covers most of its stem. The cap ranges from 4–8 cm (1 1/2–3 1/4 in) in width and 6–20 cm (2 1/2–8 in) in height. It is mostly white with shaggy scales, which are more pale brown at the apex.

The free gills change rapidly from white to pink, then deliquesces (melts) into a black liquid filled with spores (hence the "ink cap" name). It is deliquescent. The white and fairly thick stipe measures 6–40 cm (2–16 in) high by 1–2.5 cm (1/2–1 in) in diameter and has a loose ring near the bottom. Microscopically, the mushroom lacks pleurocystidia. The spore print is black-brown and the spores measure 10–13 by 6.5–8 μm. The flesh is white and the taste mild.

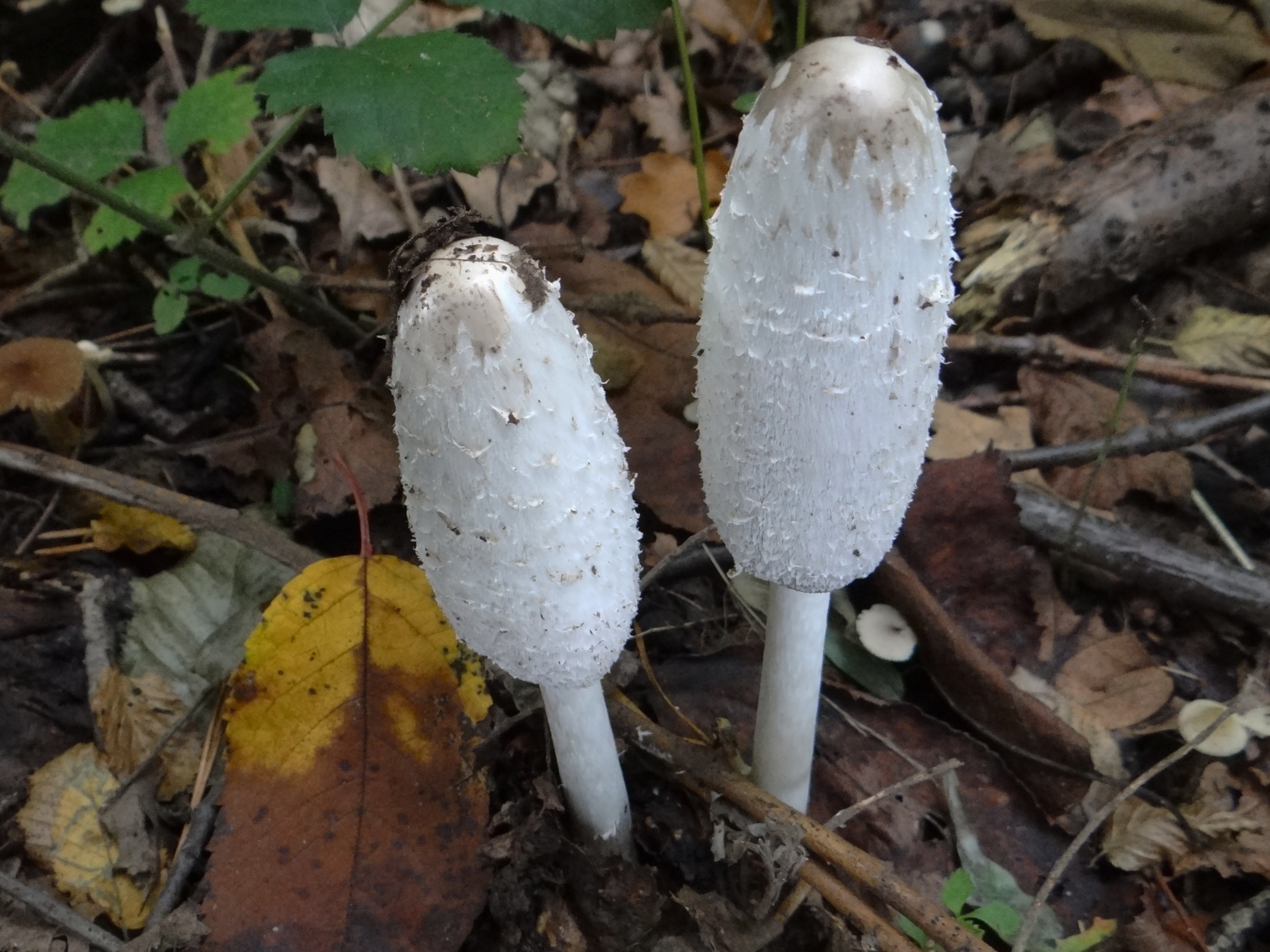
Young example

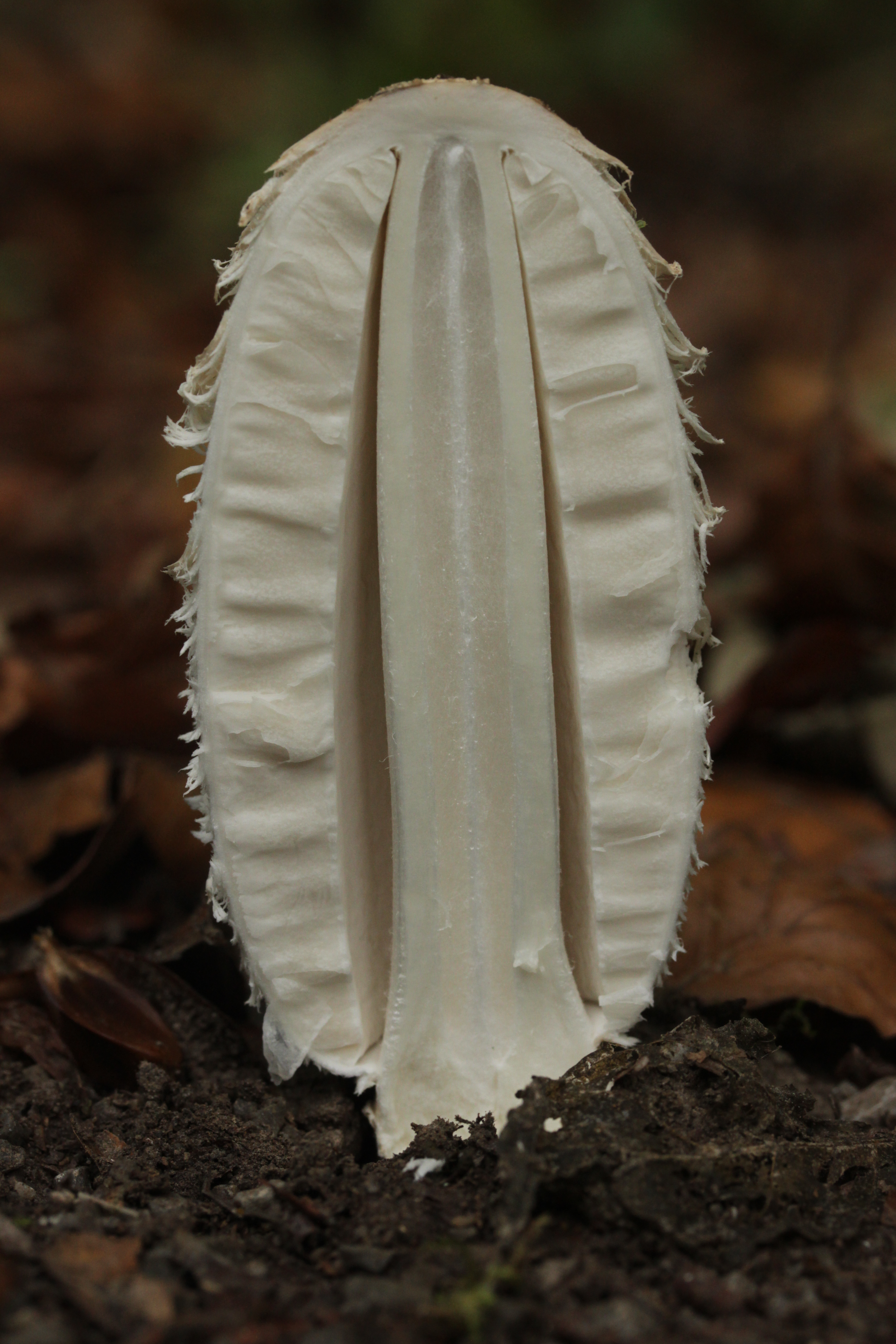
Cross section

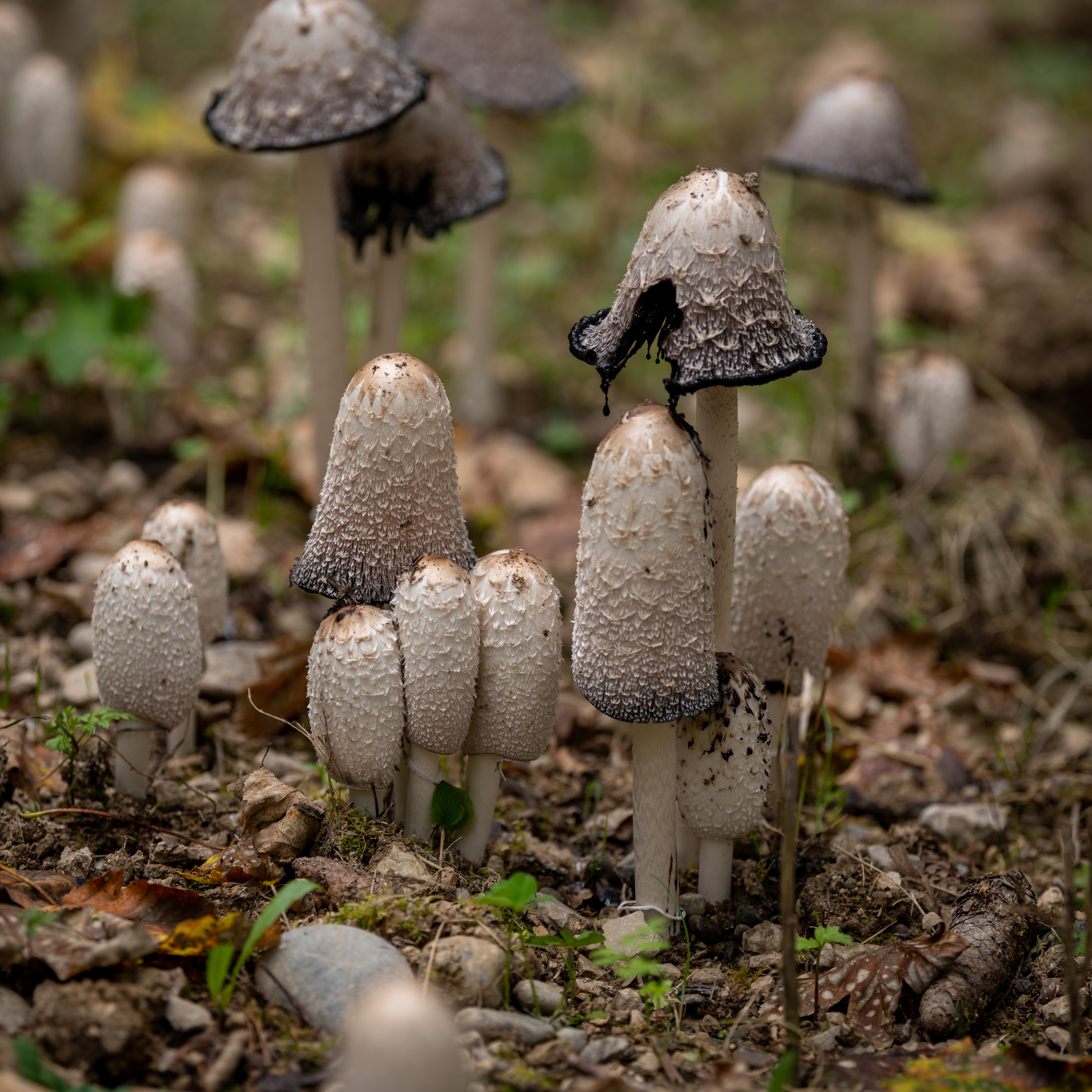
Grouping

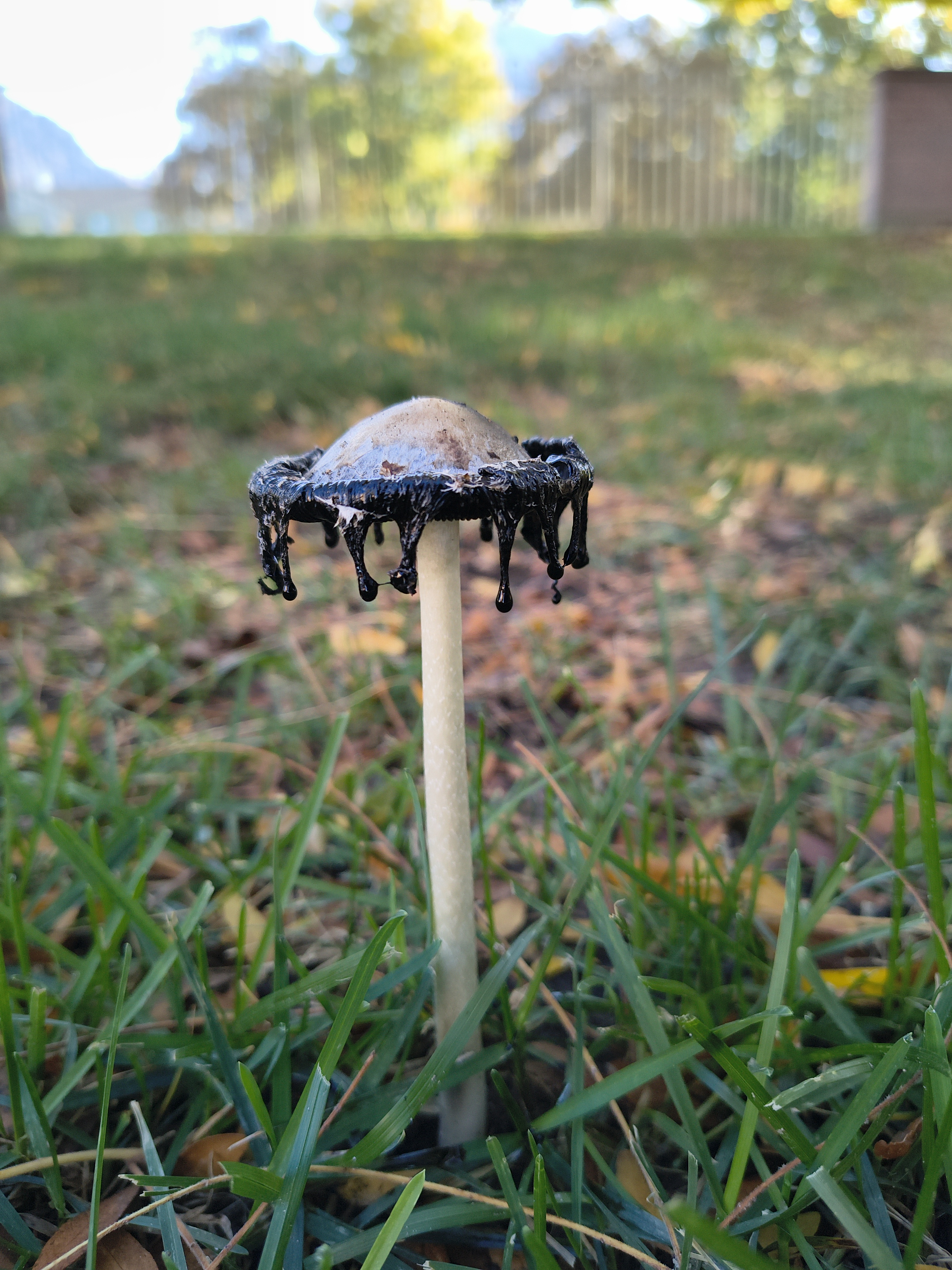
Deliquescing specimen

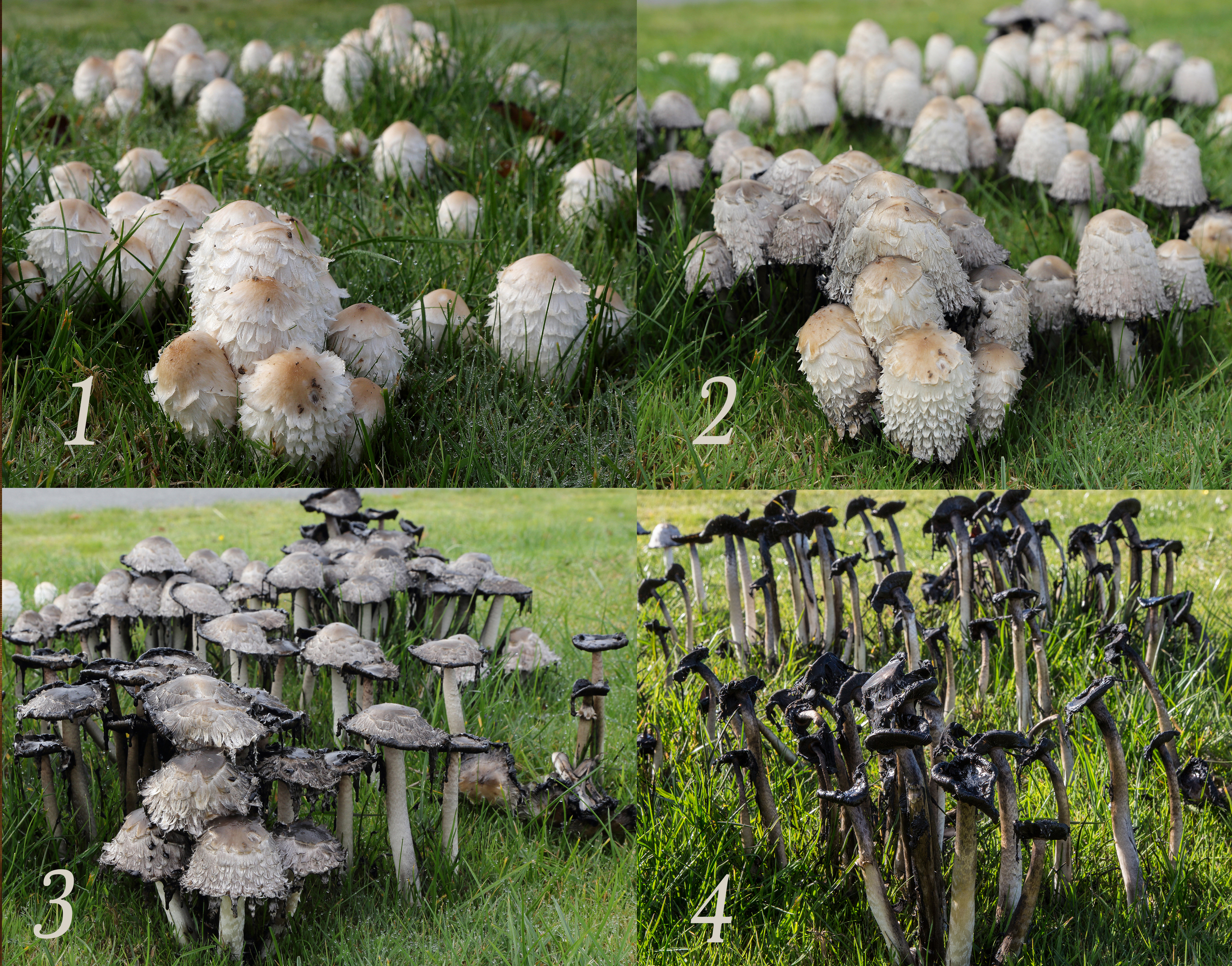
Process of deliquescence over four days

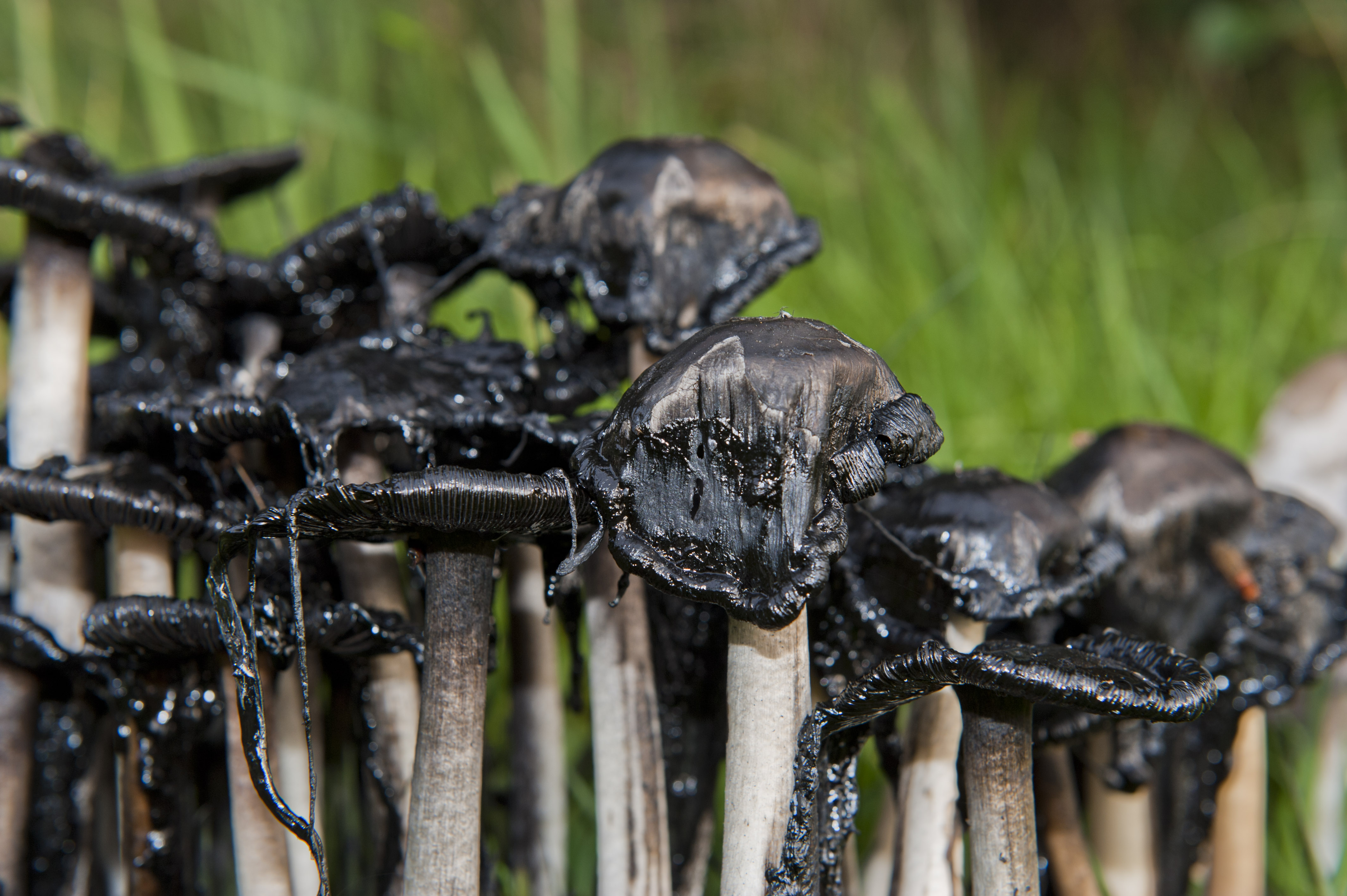
Late stage deliquescence

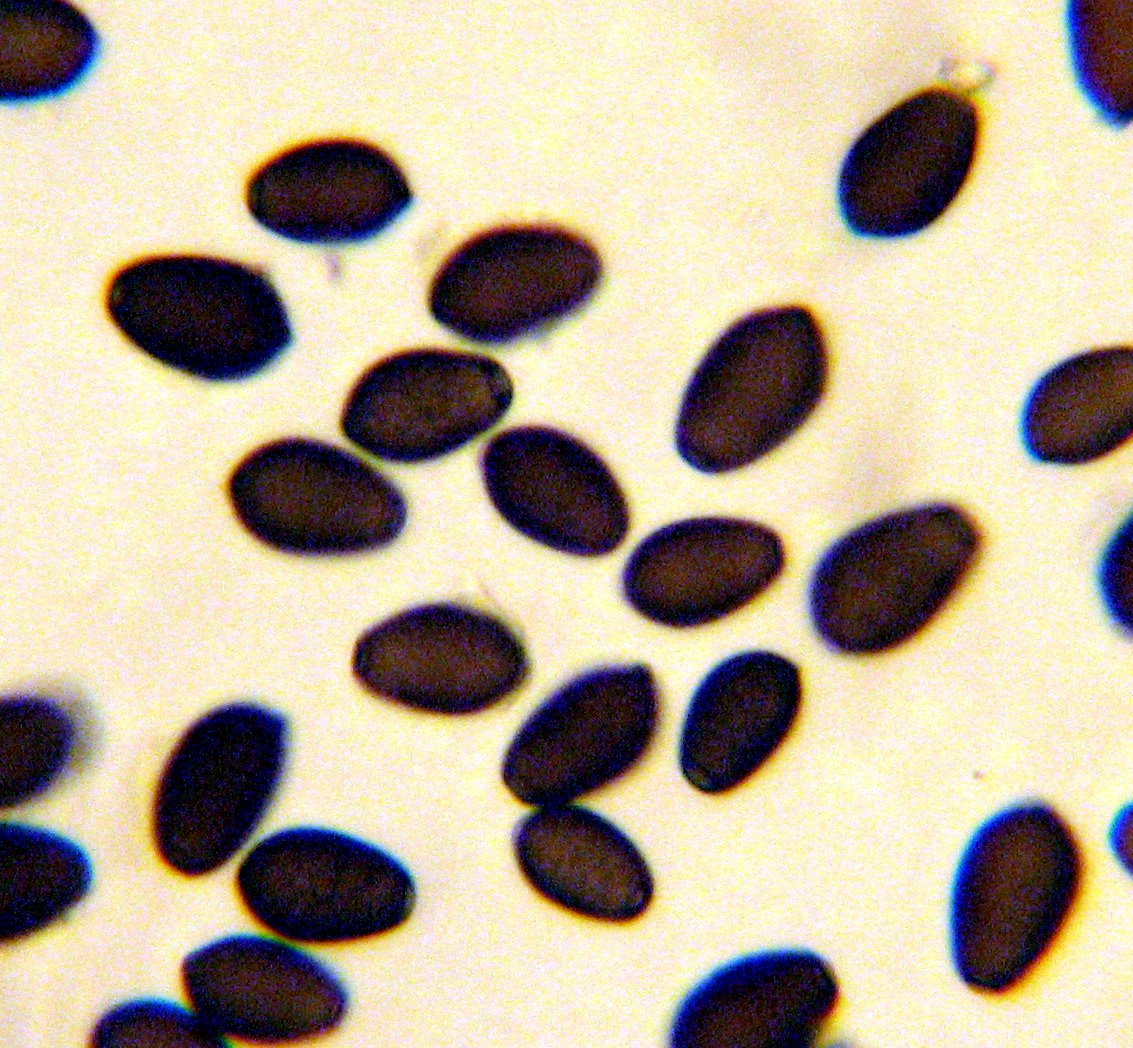
Spores

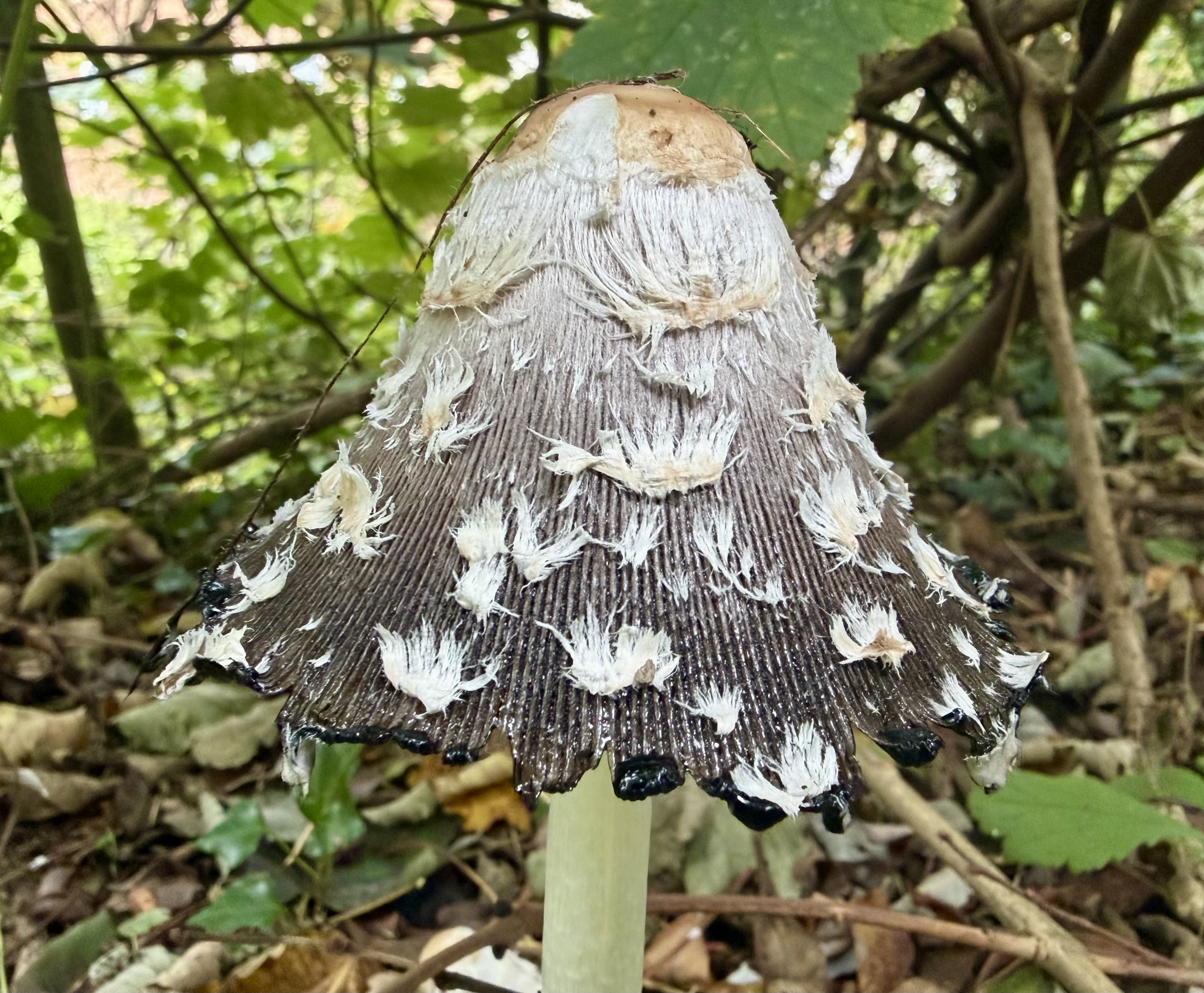
Specimen with few scales

=== Similar species ===
The mushroom can be confused with the poisonous Coprinopsis picacea (magpie fungus). In America, the 'vomiter' mushroom Chlorophyllum molybdites is responsible for most cases of mushroom poisoning due to its similarity with shaggy mane and other edible mushrooms. Coprinopsis atramentaria (the common ink cap) is similar, and contains coprine which can induce coprine poisoning, particularly when consumed with alcohol. Podaxis pistillaris is also similar.

== Habitat and distribution ==
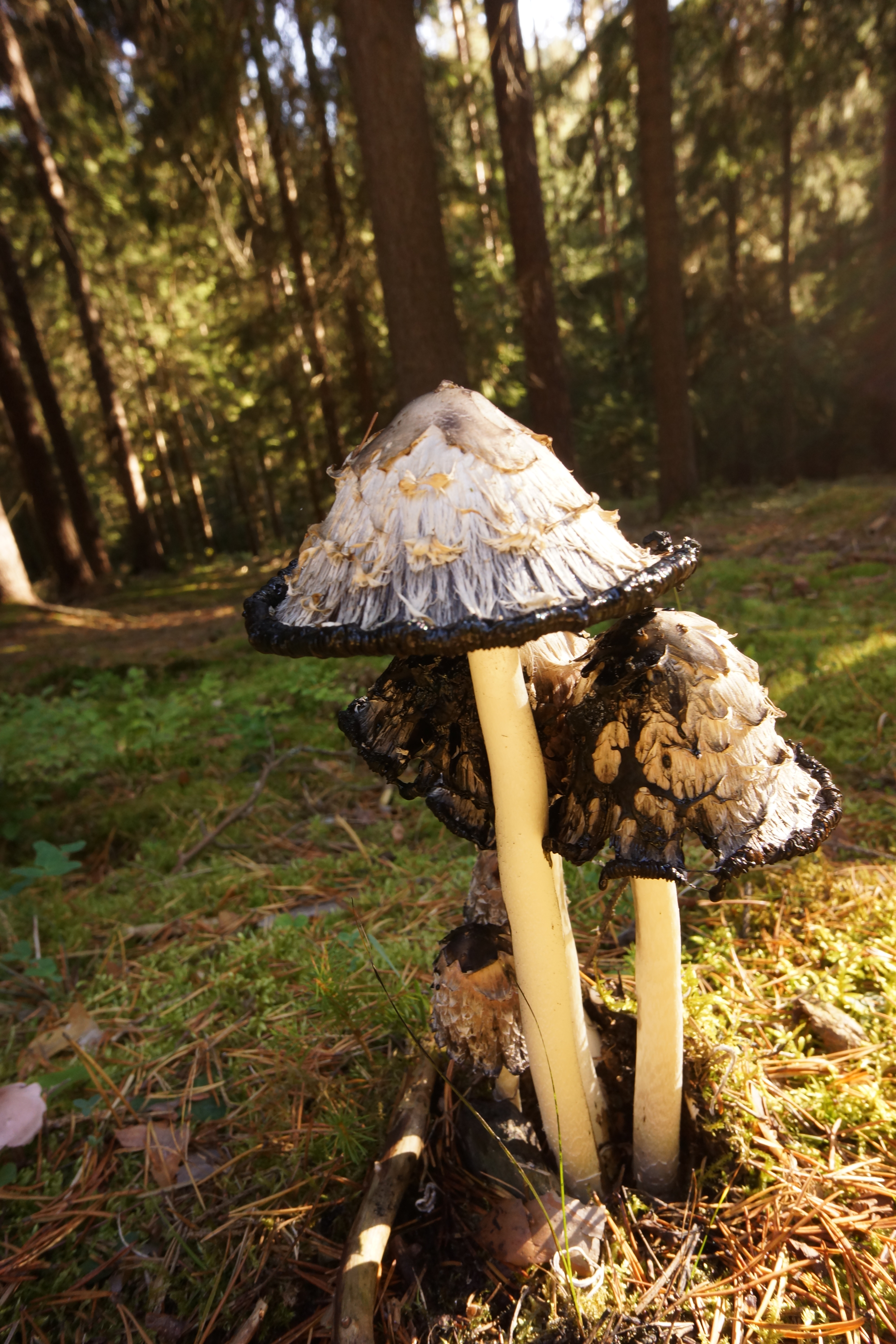
Coprinus comatus in its habitat

It grows in groups in grasslands and meadows in North America and Europe, from June through to November in the United Kingdom. It appears to have been introduced to Australia, New Zealand, and Iceland.

== Ecology ==
Coprinus comatus is a nematophagous fungus capable of killing and digesting the nematode species Panagrellus redivivus and Meloidogyne arenaria.

== Edibility ==
It is a choice edible mushroom, especially when young, before the gills start to turn black. They should be prepared soon after being collected as the black areas quickly turn bitter. The taste is mild; cooking produces a large quantity of liquid. It can sometimes be used in mushroom soup with parasol mushroom. Large quantities, microwaved then frozen, can be used as the liquid component of risotto, replacing the usual chicken stock. While other mushrooms similar to Coprinus comatus contain coprine and are thus poisonous when consumed with alcohol, this specific species does not have that effect.

== In culture ==
In Australia the species is sufficiently common to have been featured on a postage stamp issued by Australia Post in 1981.
