= PSP2 =

PSP2 or PSP 2 may refer to:

- Phantasy Star Portable 2, a video game
- PlayStation Vita or PSP 2, a successor to the PlayStation Portable handheld game console
- RBM14 or PSP2, a protein

== See also ==
- PlayStation Portable
- PSPP (disambiguation)
- PSP (disambiguation)
