= Mushroom =

Spore-bearing fruiting body of a fungus

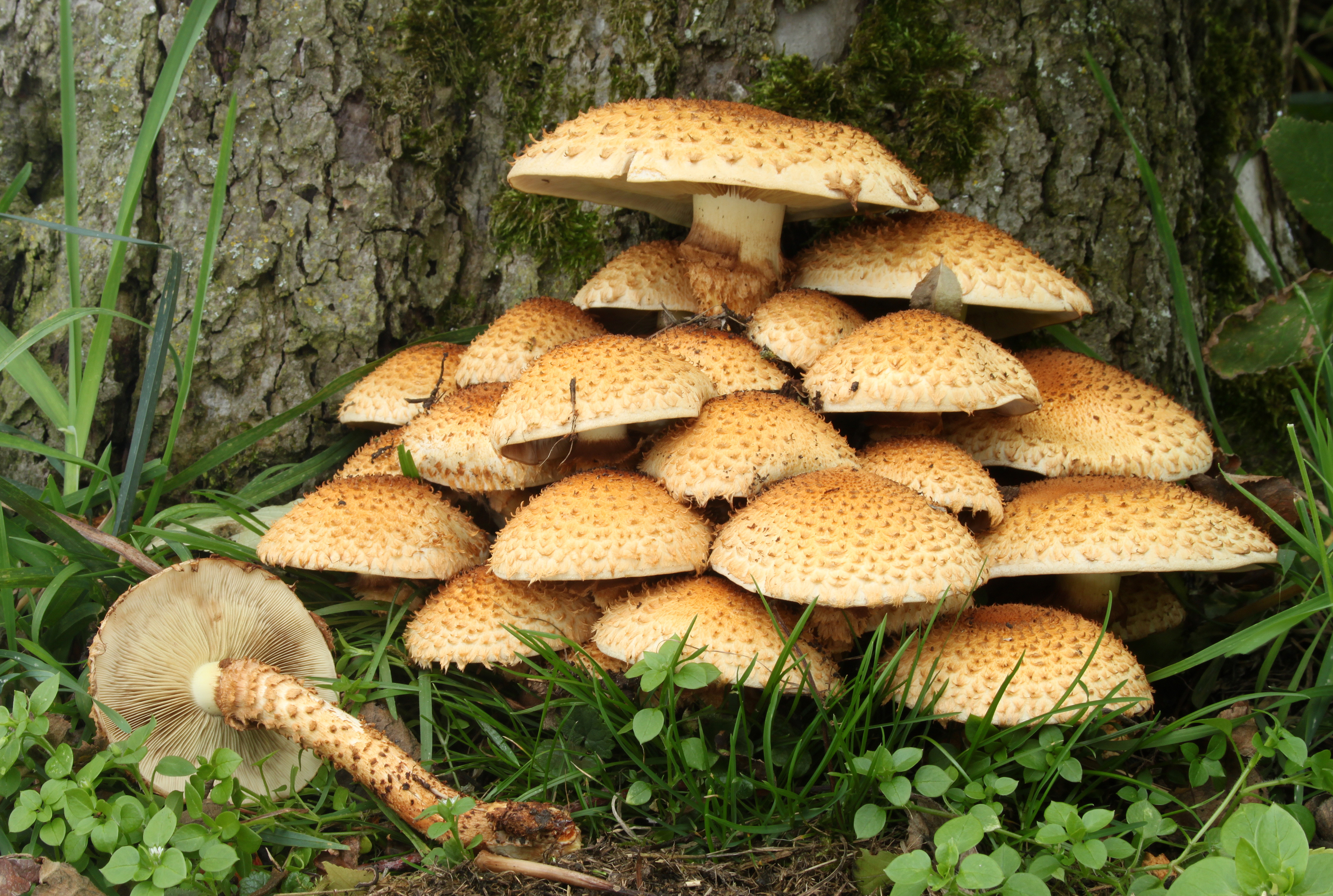
Pholiota squarrosa growing at the base of a tree

A mushroom is the fleshy, spore-bearing fruiting body of a fungus, typically produced above ground on soil or another food source. A toadstool generally refers to a poisonous mushroom.

The standard for the name "mushroom" is the cultivated white button mushroom, Agaricus bisporus; hence, the word "mushroom" is most often applied to those fungi (Basidiomycota, Agaricomycetes) that have a stem (stipe), a cap (pileus), and gills (lamellae, sing. lamella) on the underside of the cap. "Mushroom" also describes a variety of other gilled fungi, with or without stems; therefore the term is used to describe the fleshy fruiting bodies of some Ascomycota. The gills produce microscopic spores which help the fungus spread across the ground or its occupant surface.

Forms deviating from the standard morphology usually have more specific names, such as "bolete", "truffle", "puffball", "stinkhorn", and "morel", and gilled mushrooms themselves are often called "agarics" in reference to their similarity to Agaricus or their order Agaricales.

Mushrooms grow from underground mycelium and can expand rapidly under favorable conditions. They vary widely in use: some are edible and nutritious, while others are toxic or psychoactive; many have roles in folk medicine, ecology, and industry.

== Etymology ==
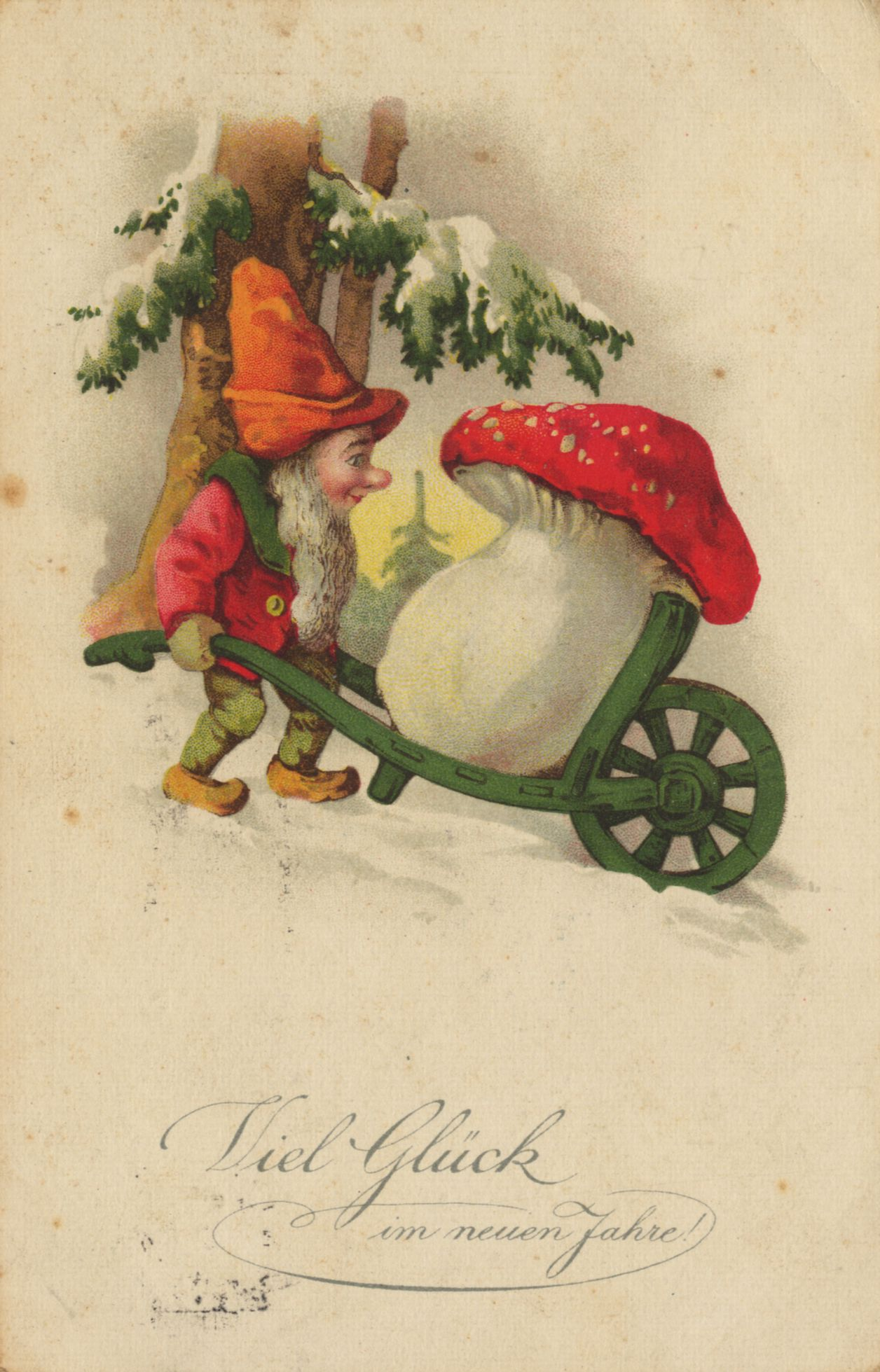
Amanita muscaria, the most easily recognised "toadstool", is frequently depicted in fairy stories and on greeting cards. It is often associated with gnomes.

The terms "mushroom" and "toadstool" go back centuries and were never precisely defined, nor was there consensus on application. During the 15th and 16th centuries, the terms mushrom, mushrum, muscheron, mousheroms, mussheron, or musserouns were used.

The term "mushroom" and its variations may have been derived from the French word mousseron in reference to moss (mousse). Delineation between edible and poisonous fungi is not clear-cut, so a "mushroom" may be edible, poisonous, or unpalatable. The word toadstool appeared first in 14th-century England as a reference for a "stool" for toads, possibly implying an inedible poisonous fungus, an association it carries in modern terminology.

== Identification ==
Identifying what is and is not a mushroom requires a basic understanding of their macroscopic structure. Most are basidiomycetes and gilled. Their spores, called basidiospores, are produced on the gills and fall in a fine rain of powder from under the caps as a result. At the microscopic level, the basidiospores are shot off basidia and then fall between the gills in the dead air space. As a result, for most mushrooms, if the cap is cut off and placed gill-side-down overnight, a powdery impression reflecting the shape of the gills (or pores, or spines, etc.) is formed (when the fruit body is sporulating). The color of the powdery print, called a spore print, is useful in both classifying and identifying mushrooms. Spore print colors include white (most common), brown, black, purple-brown, pink, yellow, and creamy, but almost never blue, green, or red.

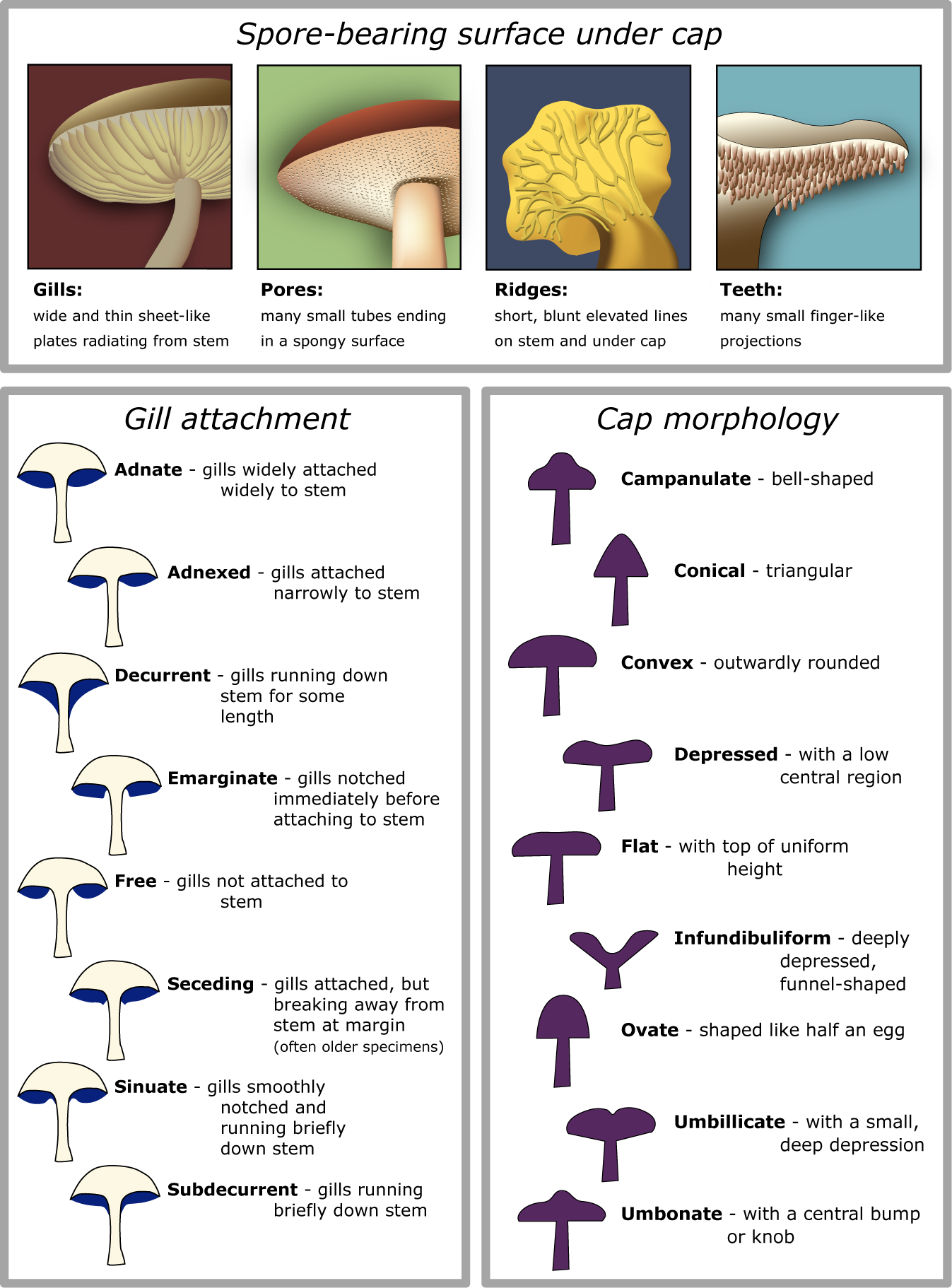
Morphological characteristics of the caps of mushrooms

While modern identification of mushrooms is quickly becoming molecular, the standard methods for identification are still used by most and have developed into a fine art harking back to medieval times and the Victorian era, combined with microscopic examination. The presence of juices upon breaking, bruising-reactions, odors, tastes, shades of color, habitat, habit, and season are all considered by both amateur and professional mycologists. Tasting and smelling mushrooms carries its own hazards because of poisons and allergens. Chemical tests are also used for some genera.

In general, identification to genus can often be accomplished in the field using a local field guide. Identification to species, however, requires more effort. A mushroom develops from a button stage into a mature structure, and only the latter can provide certain characteristics needed for the identification of the species. However, over-mature specimens lose features and cease producing spores. Many novices have mistaken humid water marks on paper for white spore prints, or discolored paper from oozing liquids on lamella edges for colored spored prints.

== Classification ==
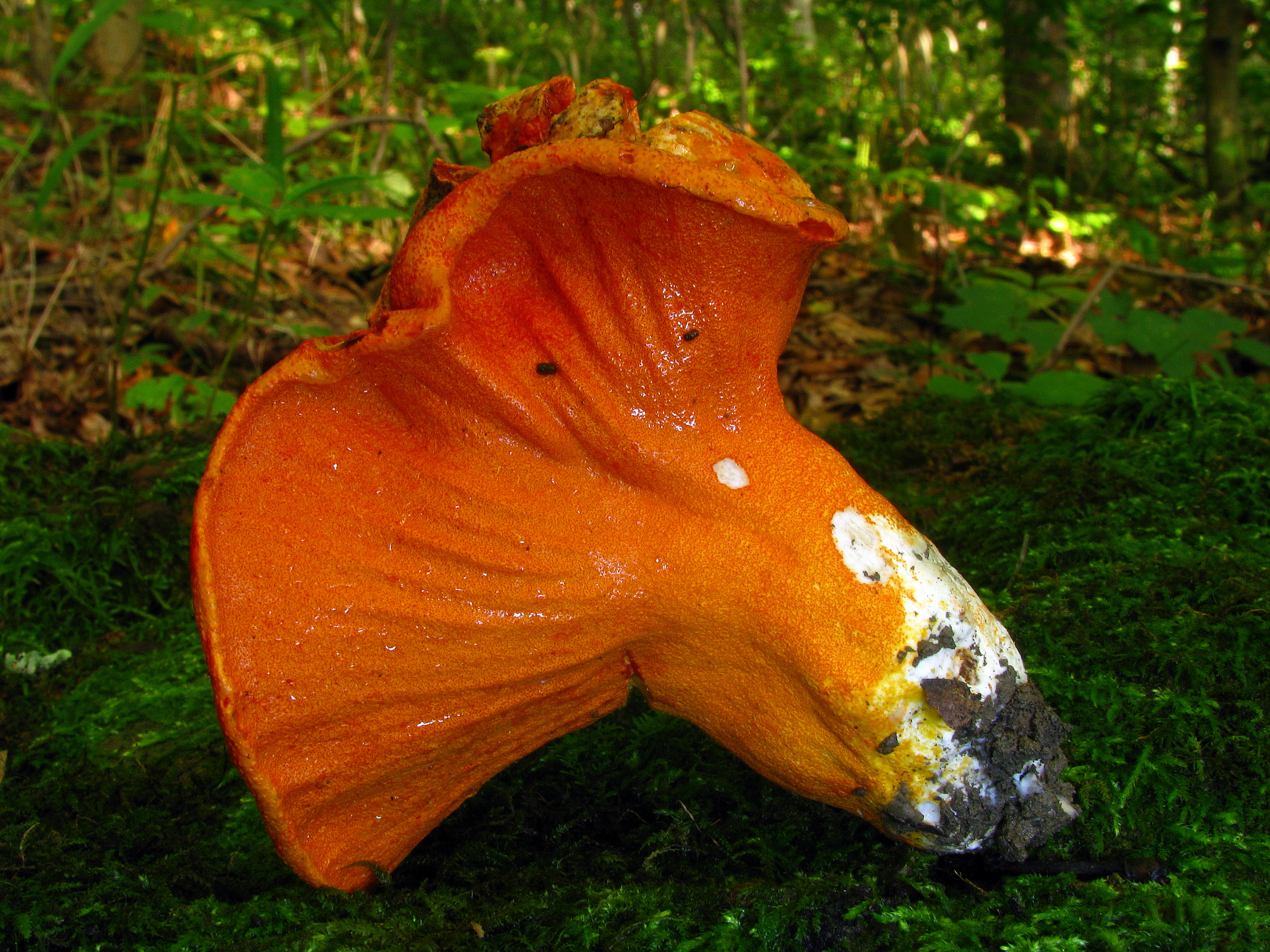
A mushroom (probably Russula brevipes) parasitized by Hypomyces lactifluorum, resulting in a "lobster mushroom"

Typical mushrooms are the fruit bodies of members of the order Agaricales, whose type genus is Agaricus and type species is the field mushroom, Agaricus campestris. However in modern molecularly defined classifications, not all members of the order Agaricales produce mushroom fruit bodies, and many other gilled fungi, collectively called mushrooms, occur in other orders of the class Agaricomycetes. For example, chanterelles are in the Cantharellales, false chanterelles such as Gomphus are in the Gomphales, milk-cap mushrooms (Lactarius, Lactifluus) and russulas (Russula), as well as Lentinellus, are in the Russulales, while the tough, leathery genera Lentinus and Panus are among the Polyporales, but Neolentinus is in the Gloeophyllales, and the little pin-mushroom genus, Rickenella, along with similar genera, are in the Hymenochaetales.

Within the main body of mushrooms, in the Agaricales, are common fungi like the common fairy-ring mushroom, shiitake, enoki, oyster mushrooms, fly agarics and other Amanitas, magic mushrooms like species of Psilocybe, paddy straw mushrooms, shaggy manes, etc.

An atypical mushroom is the lobster mushroom, which is a fruit body of a Russula or Lactarius mushroom that has been deformed by the parasitic fungus Hypomyces lactifluorum. This gives the affected mushroom an unusual shape and red color that resembles that of a boiled American lobster.

Other mushrooms are not gilled, so the term "mushroom" is loosely used, and giving a full account of their classifications is difficult. Some have pores underneath, others have spines, such as the hedgehog mushroom and other tooth fungi, and so on. "Mushroom" has been used for polypores, puffballs, jelly fungi, coral fungi, bracket fungi, stinkhorns, and cup fungi. Thus, the term is more one of common application to macroscopic fungal fruiting bodies than one having precise taxonomic meaning. Approximately 14,000 species of mushrooms are described.

== Morphology ==
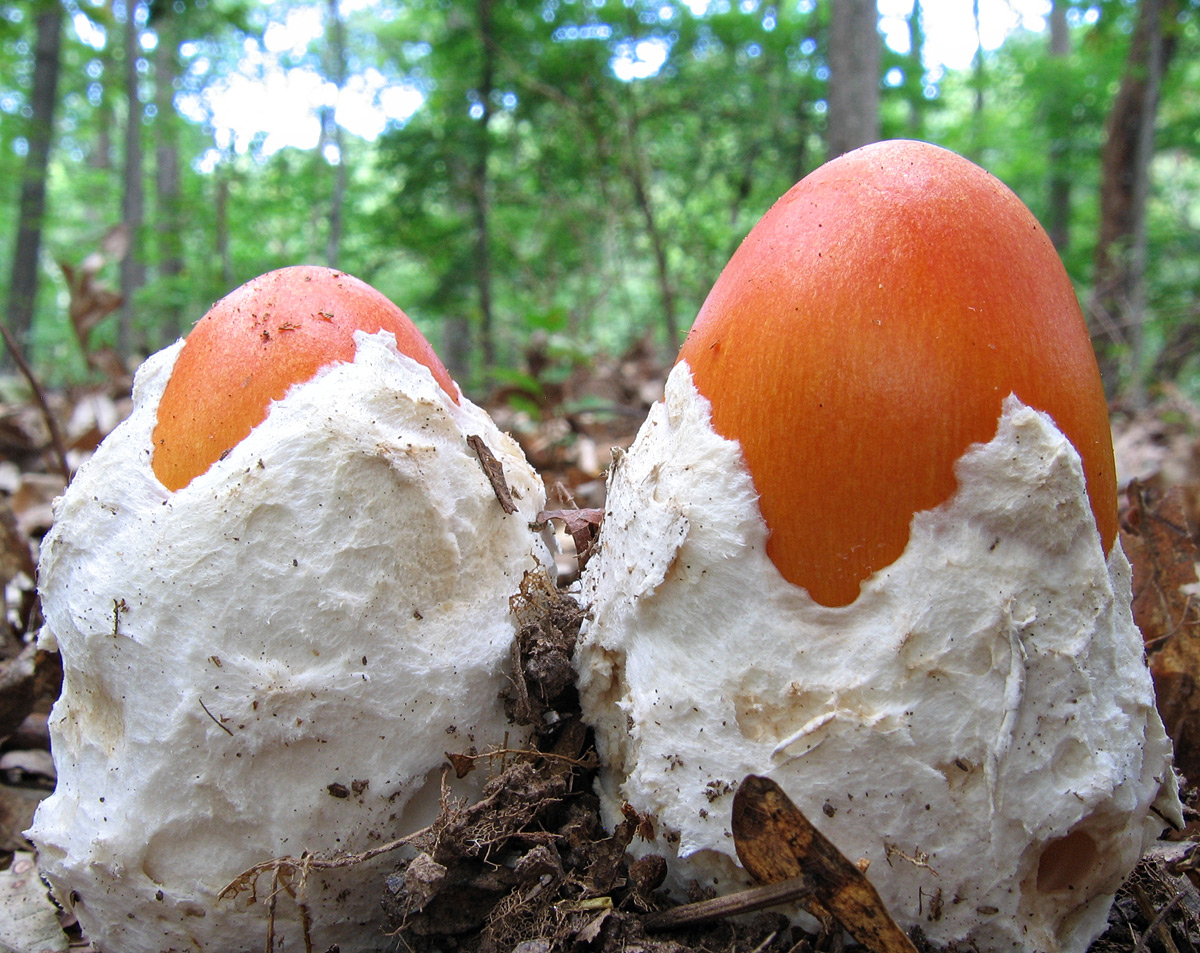
Amanita jacksonii buttons emerging from their universal veils

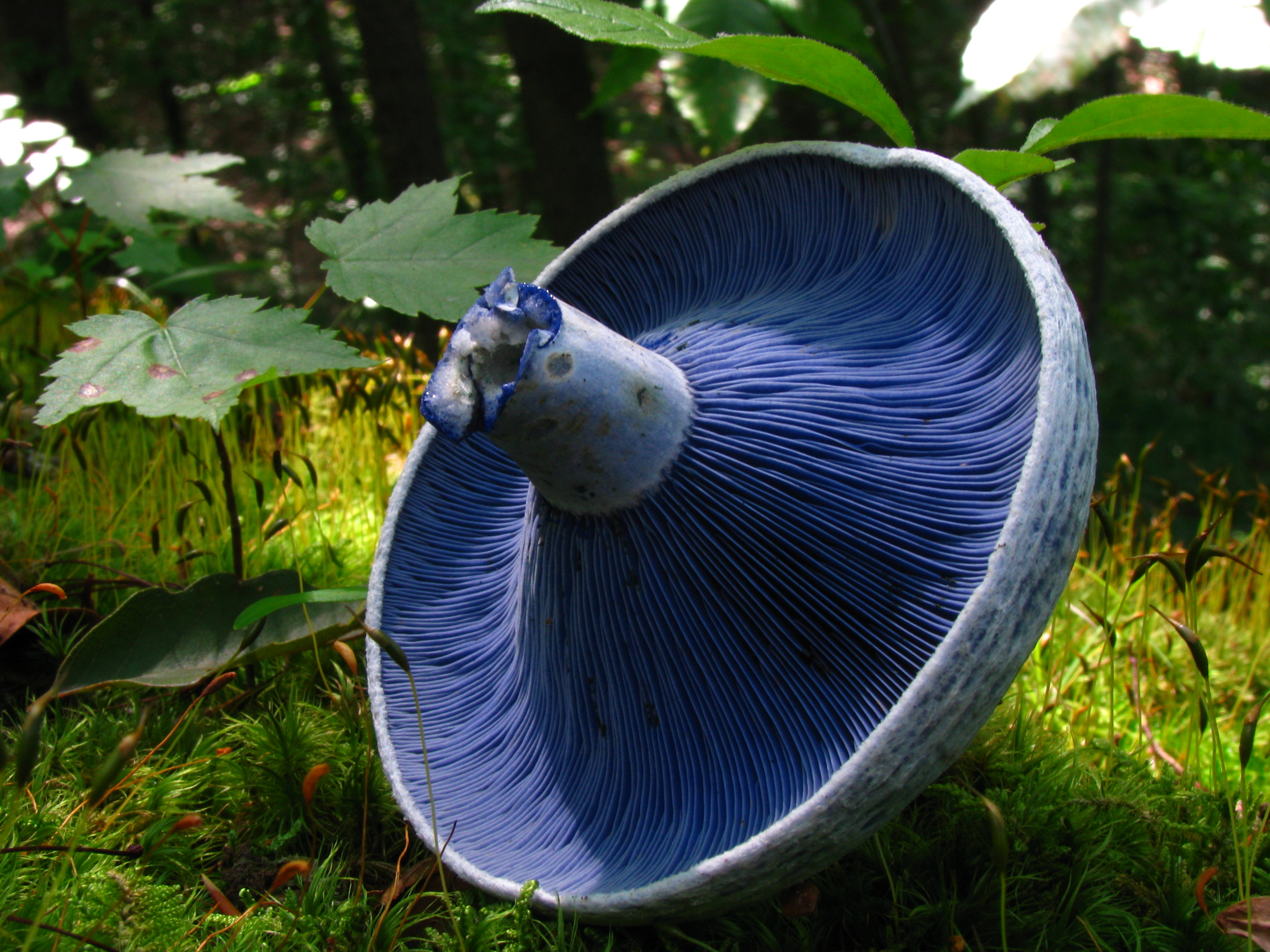
The blue gills of Lactarius indigo, a milk-cap mushroom

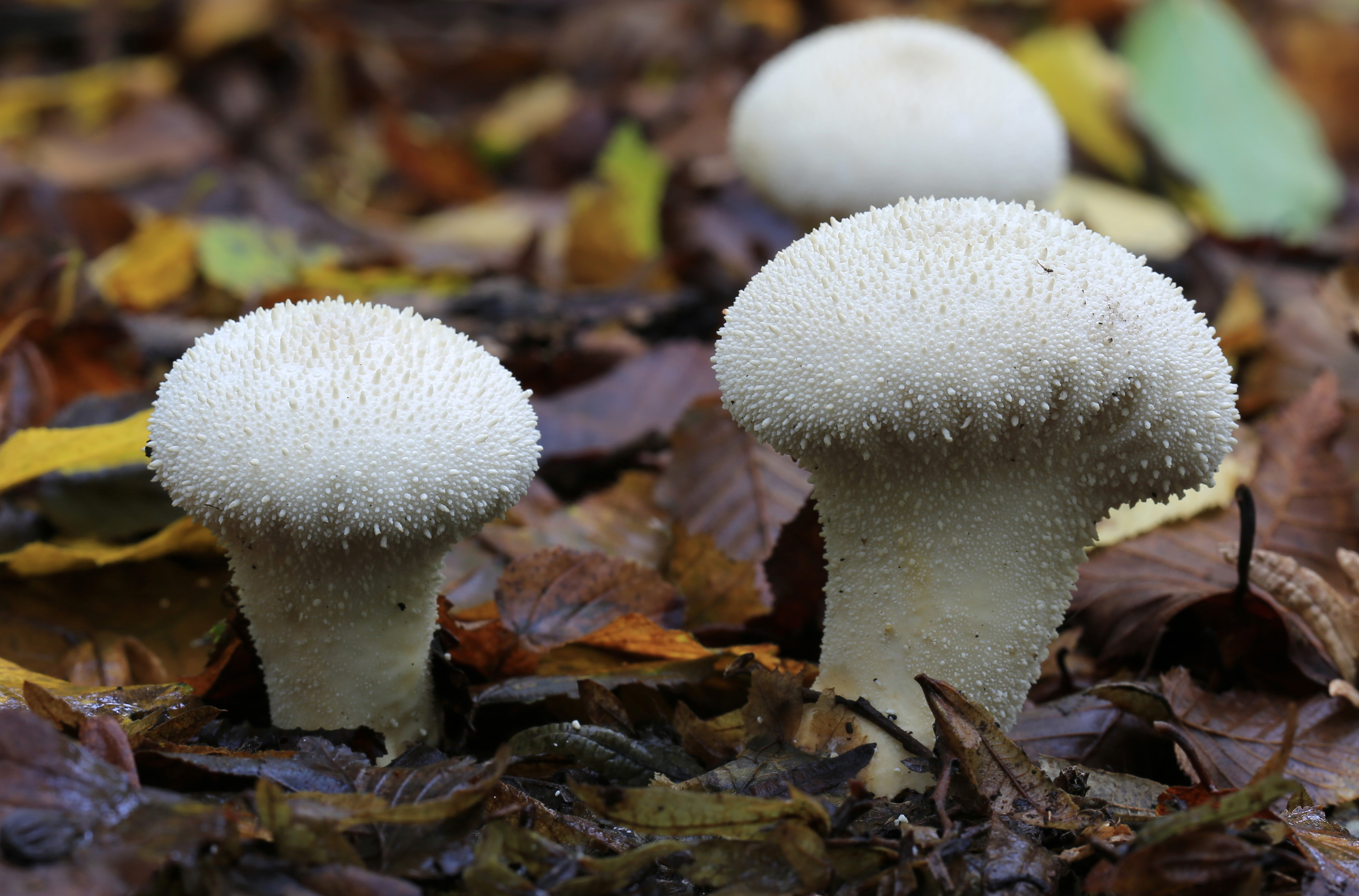
Lycoperdon perlatum (the "common puffball") has a glebal hymenium; when young, the interior is white, but it becomes brown containing powdery spores as the fungus matures.

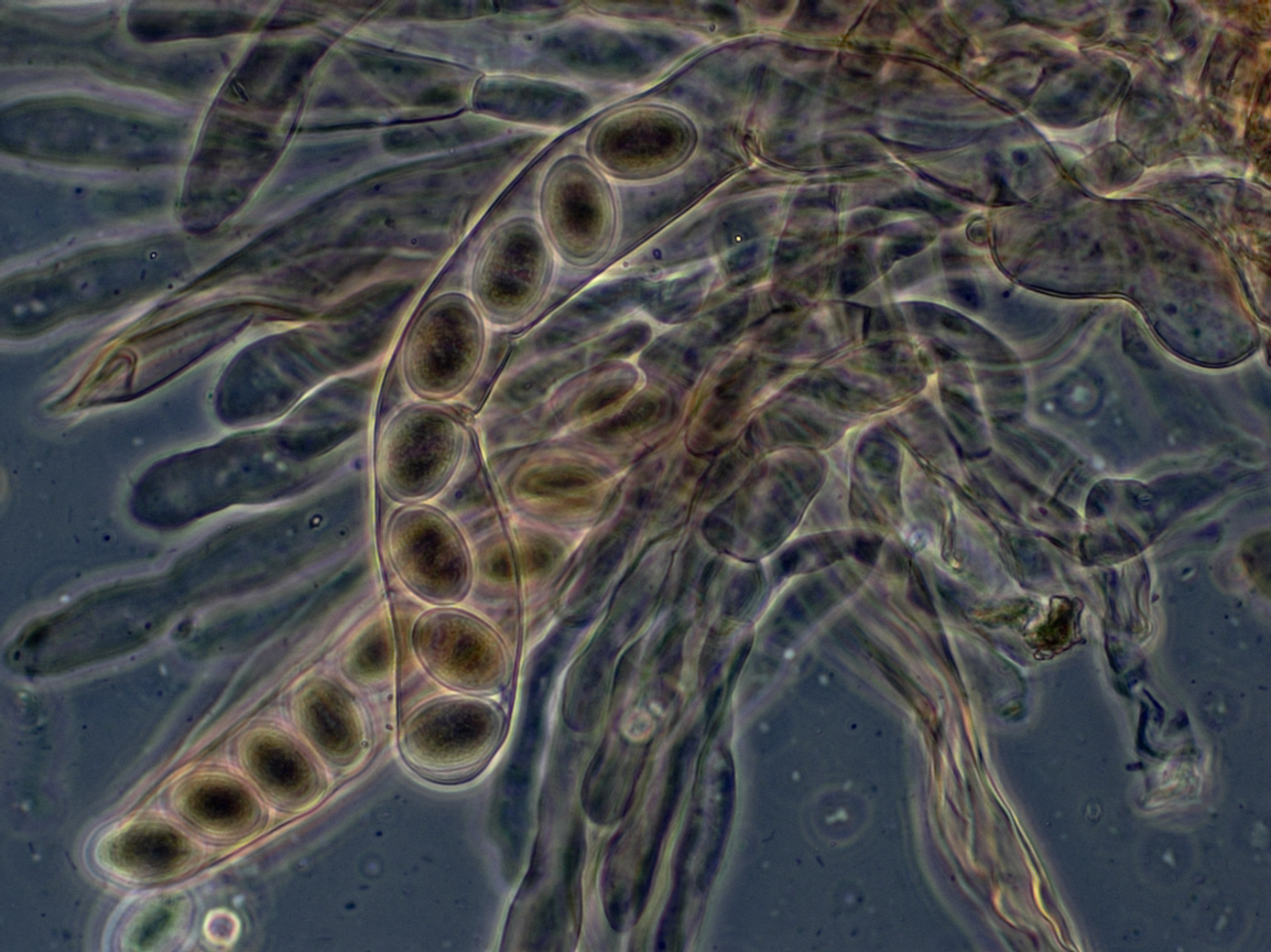
Morchella elata asci viewed with phase contrast microscopy

A mushroom develops from a nodule, or pinhead, less than two millimeters in diameter, called a primordium, which is typically found on or near the surface of the substrate. It is formed within the mycelium, the mass of threadlike hyphae that make up the fungus. The primordium enlarges into a roundish structure of interwoven hyphae roughly resembling an egg, called a "button". The button has a cottony roll of mycelium, the universal veil, that surrounds the developing fruit body. As the egg expands, the universal veil ruptures and may remain as a cup, or volva, at the base of the stalk, or as warts or volval patches on the cap. Many mushrooms lack a universal veil; therefore, they do not have either a volva or volval patches. Often, a second layer of tissue, the partial veil, covers the blade-like gills that bear spores. As the cap expands the veil breaks, and remnants of the partial veil may remain as a ring, or annulus, around the middle of the stalk or as fragments hanging from the margin of the cap. The ring may be skirt-like as in some species of Amanita, collar-like as in many species of Lepiota, or merely the faint remnants of a cortina (a partial veil composed of filaments resembling a spiderweb), which is typical of the genus Cortinarius. Mushrooms lacking partial veils do not form an annulus.

The stalk (also called the stipe, or stem) may be central and support the cap in the middle, or it may be off-center or lateral, as in species of Pleurotus and Panus. In other mushrooms, a stalk may be absent, as in the polypores that form shelf-like brackets. Puffballs lack a stalk, but may have a supporting base. Other mushrooms including truffles, jellies, earthstars, and bird's nests usually do not have stalks, and a specialized mycological vocabulary exists to describe their parts.

The way the gills attach to the top of the stalk is an important feature of mushroom morphology. Mushrooms in the genera Agaricus, Amanita, Lepiota and Pluteus, among others, have free gills that do not extend to the top of the stalk. Others have decurrent gills that extend down the stalk, as in the genera Omphalotus and Pleurotus. There are a great number of variations between the extremes of free and decurrent, collectively called attached gills. Finer distinctions are often made to distinguish the types of attached gills: adnate gills, which adjoin squarely to the stalk; notched gills, which are notched where they join the top of the stalk; adnexed gills, which curve upward to meet the stalk, and so on. These distinctions between attached gills are sometimes difficult to interpret, since gill attachment may change as the mushroom matures, or with different environmental conditions.

=== Microscopic features ===
A hymenium is a layer of microscopic spore-bearing cells that covers the surface of gills. In the nongilled mushrooms, the hymenium lines the inner surfaces of the tubes of boletes and polypores, or covers the teeth of spine fungi and the branches of corals. In the Ascomycota, spores develop within microscopic elongated, sac-like cells called asci, which typically contain eight spores in each ascus. The Discomycetes, which contain the cup, sponge, brain, and some club-like fungi, develop an exposed layer of asci, as on the inner surfaces of cup fungi or within the pits of morels. The Pyrenomycetes, tiny dark-colored fungi that live on a wide range of substrates including soil, dung, leaf litter, and decaying wood, as well as other fungi, produce minute, flask-shaped structures called perithecia, within which the asci develop.

In the basidiomycetes, usually four spores develop on the tips of thin projections called sterigmata, which extend from club-shaped cells called a basidia. The fertile portion of the Gasteromycetes, called a gleba, may become powdery as in the puffballs or slimy as in the stinkhorns. Interspersed among the asci are threadlike sterile cells called paraphyses. Similar structures called cystidia often occur within the hymenium of the Basidiomycota. Many types of cystidia exist, and assessing their presence, shape, and size is often used to verify the identification of a mushroom. Cystidia on the faces of gills are called pleurocystidia, while cystidia on the edges of the gills are called cheilocystidia.

The most important microscopic feature for identification of mushrooms is the spores. Their color, shape, size, attachment, ornamentation, and reaction to chemical tests often can be the crux of an identification. A spore often has a protrusion at one end, called an apiculus, which is the point of attachment to the basidium, termed the apical germ pore, from which the hypha emerges when the spore germinates.

The cell walls of mushrooms are composed mainly of glucans and chitin. Glucans have potential roles in reserving energy, providing structure, cell-to-cell signaling, and cellular protection.

== Growth ==
Timelapse of oyster mushrooms (Pleurotus ostreatus) growing on a Petri dish

Many species of mushrooms seemingly appear overnight, growing or expanding rapidly. This phenomenon is the source of several common expressions in the English language including "to mushroom" or "mushrooming" (expanding rapidly in size or scope) and "to pop up like a mushroom" (to appear unexpectedly and quickly). In reality, all species of mushrooms take several days to form primordial mushroom fruit bodies, though they do expand rapidly by the absorption of fluids.

The cultivated mushroom, as well as the common field mushroom, initially form a minute fruiting body, referred to as the pin stage because of their small size. Slightly expanded, they are called buttons, once again because of the relative size and shape. Once such stages are formed, the mushroom can rapidly pull in water from its mycelium and expand, mainly by inflating preformed cells that took several days to form in the primordia.

Similarly, there are other mushrooms, like Parasola plicatilis (formerly Coprinus plicatlis), that grow rapidly overnight and may disappear by late afternoon on a hot day after rainfall. The primordia form at ground level in lawns in humid spaces under the thatch and after heavy rainfall or in dewy conditions balloon to full size in a few hours, release spores, and then collapse.

Not all mushrooms expand overnight; some grow very slowly and add tissue to their fruiting bodies by growing from the edges of the colony or by inserting hyphae. For example, Pleurotus nebrodensis grows slowly, and because of this combined with human collection, it is now critically endangered.

Though mushroom fruiting bodies are short-lived, the underlying mycelium can itself be long-lived and massive. A colony of Armillaria solidipes (formerly known as Armillaria ostoyae) in Malheur National Forest in the United States is estimated to be 2,400 years old, possibly older, and spans an estimated 2,200 acres (8.9 km^{2}). Most of the fungus is underground and in decaying wood or dying tree roots in the form of white mycelia combined with black shoelace-like rhizomorphs that bridge colonized separated woody substrates.

== Production ==
Per capita production of mushrooms

Production of mushrooms

== Nutrition ==
Mushrooms (brown, Italian, crimini)
Nutritional value per 100 g (3.5 oz)
- Energy: 94 kJ (22 kcal)
- Carbohydrates: 4.3 g
- Sugars: 1.72 g
- Dietary fiber: 0.6 g
- Fat: 0.1 g
- Protein: 2.5 g
Vitamins and minerals
Vitamins	Quantity %DV^{†}
Thiamine (B1)	8% 0.095 mg
Riboflavin (B2)	38% 0.5 mg
Niacin (B3)	24% 3.8 mg
Pantothenic acid (B5)	30% 1.5 mg
Vitamin B6	6% 0.11 mg
Folate (B9)	6% 25 μg
Vitamin C	0% 0 mg
Vitamin D	0% 3 IU
Minerals	Quantity %DV^{†}
Calcium	1% 18 mg
Copper	56% 0.5 mg
Iron	2% 0.4 mg
Magnesium	2% 9 mg
Manganese	6% 0.142 mg
Phosphorus	10% 120 mg
Potassium	15% 448 mg
Selenium	47% 26 μg
Sodium	0% 6 mg
Zinc	10% 1.1 mg
- Other constituents: Quantity
- Water: 92.1 g
- Full Link to USDA Food Data Central entry
- ^{†}Percentages estimated using US recommendations for adults, except for potassium, which is estimated based on expert recommendation from the National Academies.

Raw brown mushrooms are 92% water, 4% carbohydrates, 2% protein and less than 1% fat (table). In a reference amount of 100 grams (3.5 oz), raw brown mushrooms provide 22 calories, and are a rich source (20% or more of the Daily Value, DV) of B vitamins, such as riboflavin, niacin and pantothenic acid, selenium (47% DV) and copper (56% DV) (table). They are a moderate source of phosphorus, zinc and potassium (10–15% DV). They have minimal or no vitamin C or sodium content.

=== Vitamin D ===
The vitamin D content of a mushroom depends on postharvest handling, in particular the unintended exposure to sunlight. The US Department of Agriculture provided evidence that UV-exposed mushrooms contain substantial amounts of vitamin D. When exposed to ultraviolet (UV) light, even after harvesting, ergosterol in mushrooms is converted to vitamin D_{2}, a process now used intentionally to supply fresh vitamin D mushrooms for the functional food grocery market. In a comprehensive safety assessment of producing vitamin D in fresh mushrooms, researchers showed that artificial UV light technologies were equally effective for vitamin D production as in mushrooms exposed to natural sunlight, and that UV light has a long record of safe use for production of vitamin D in food.

== Human use ==
=== Edible mushrooms ===
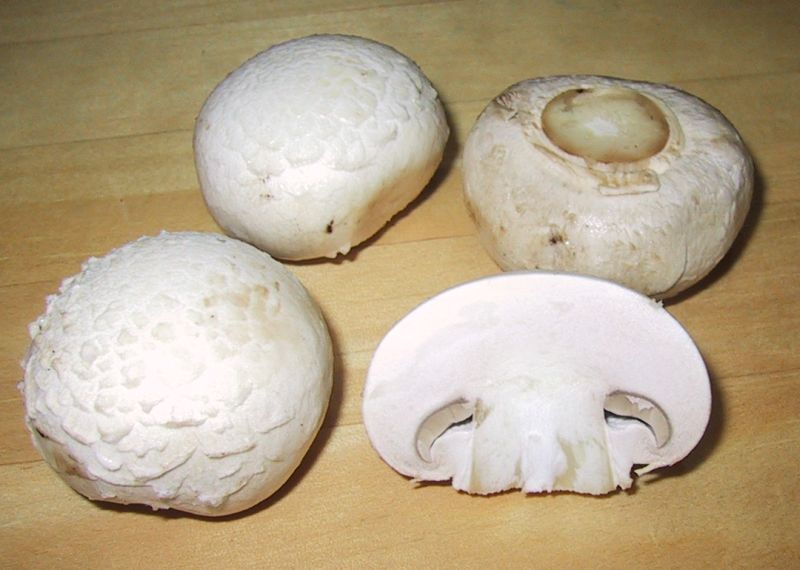
Agaricus bisporus, one of the most widely cultivated and consumed mushrooms

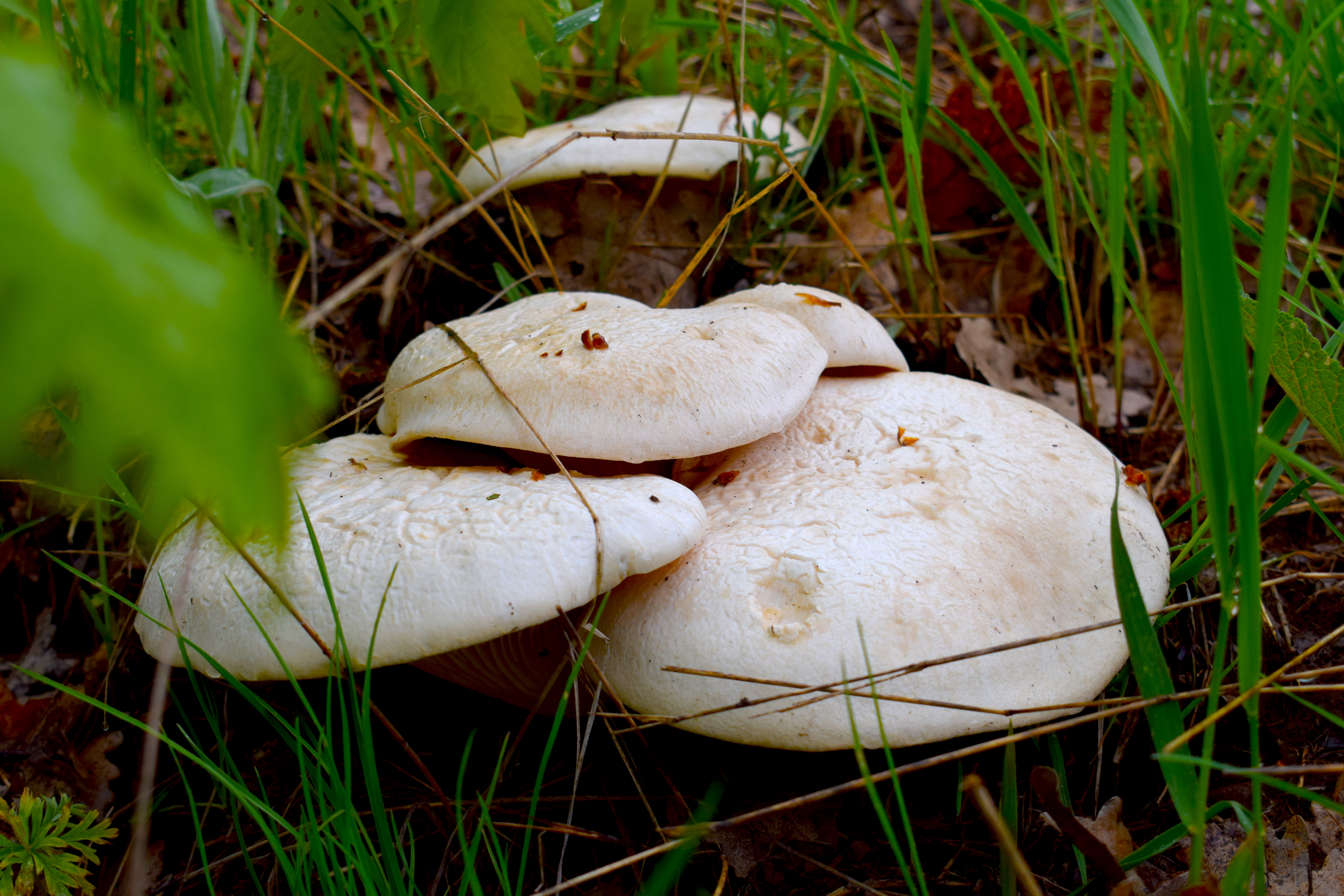
Ferula mushroom in Bingöl, Turkey. This is an edible mushroom.

Mushrooms are used extensively in cooking, in many cuisines (notably Chinese, Korean, European, and Japanese). Humans have valued them as food since antiquity.

Most mushrooms sold in supermarkets have been commercially grown on mushroom farms. The most common of these, Agaricus bisporus, is considered safe for most people to eat because it is grown in controlled, sterilized environments. Several varieties of A. bisporus are grown commercially, including whites, crimini, and portobello. Other cultivated species available at many grocers include Hericium erinaceus, shiitake, maitake (hen-of-the-woods), Pleurotus, and enoki. In recent years, increasing affluence in developing countries has led to a considerable growth in interest in mushroom cultivation, which is now seen as a potentially important economic activity for small farmers.

China is a major edible mushroom producer. The country produces about half of all cultivated mushrooms, and around 2.7 kilograms (6.0 lb) of mushrooms are consumed per person per year by 1.4 billion people. In 2014, Poland was the world's largest mushroom exporter, reporting an estimated 194,000 tonnes (191,000 long tons; 214,000 short tons) annually.

Separating edible from poisonous species requires meticulous attention to detail; there is no single trait by which all toxic mushrooms can be identified, nor one by which all edible mushrooms can be identified. People who collect mushrooms for consumption are known as mycophagists, and the act of collecting them for such is known as mushroom hunting, or simply "mushrooming". Even edible mushrooms may produce allergic reactions in susceptible individuals, from a mild asthmatic response to severe anaphylactic shock. Even the cultivated A. bisporus contains small amounts of hydrazines, the most abundant of which is agaritine (a mycotoxin and carcinogen). However, the hydrazines are destroyed by moderate heat when cooking.

A number of species of mushrooms are poisonous; although some resemble certain edible species, consuming them could be fatal. Eating mushrooms gathered in the wild is risky and should only be undertaken by individuals knowledgeable in mushroom identification. Common best practice is for wild mushroom pickers to focus on collecting a small number of visually distinctive, edible mushroom species that cannot be easily confused with poisonous varieties. Common mushroom hunting advice is that if a mushroom cannot be positively identified, it should be considered poisonous and not eaten.

In Jainism, the consumption of mushrooms and other edible fungi is strictly prohibited. This dietary restriction is fundamentally rooted in the religion's core ethical principle of nonviolence (ahimsa). Classical Jain taxonomy classifies mushrooms as ananthkay, meaning they are considered to be bodies that harbor an infinite number of microscopic souls or lifeforms (nigoda). Furthermore, because mushrooms frequently grow in dark environments or on decaying organic matter, traditional Jain biology views them as continuous breeding grounds for mobile microorganisms (trasa jiva). Consequently, Jain dietary laws mandate the absolute avoidance of mushrooms to prevent the mass destruction of these microscopic organisms.

=== Toxic mushrooms ===
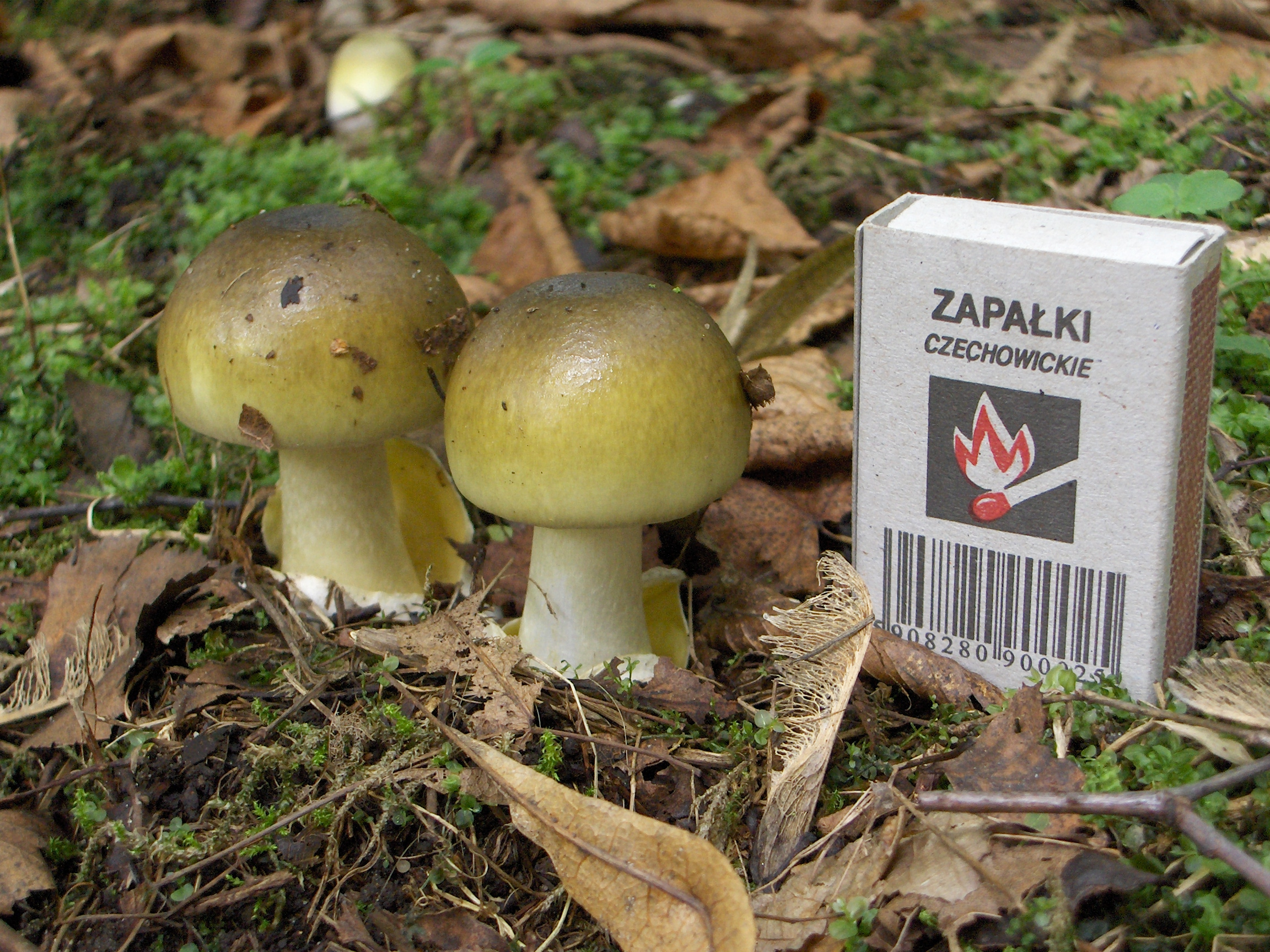
Young Amanita phalloides "death cap" mushrooms, with a matchbox for size comparison

Many mushroom species produce secondary metabolites that can be toxic, mind-altering, antibiotic, antiviral, or bioluminescent. Although there are only a small number of deadly species, several others can cause particularly severe and unpleasant symptoms. Toxicity likely plays a role in protecting the function of the basidiocarp: the mycelium has expended considerable energy and protoplasmic material to develop a structure to efficiently distribute its spores. One defense against consumption and premature destruction is the evolution of chemicals that render the mushroom inedible, either causing the consumer to vomit the meal (see emetics), or to learn to avoid consumption altogether. In addition, due to the propensity of mushrooms to absorb heavy metals, including those that are radioactive, as late as 2008, European mushrooms may have included toxicity from the 1986 Chernobyl disaster and have continued to be studied.

=== Psychoactive mushrooms ===
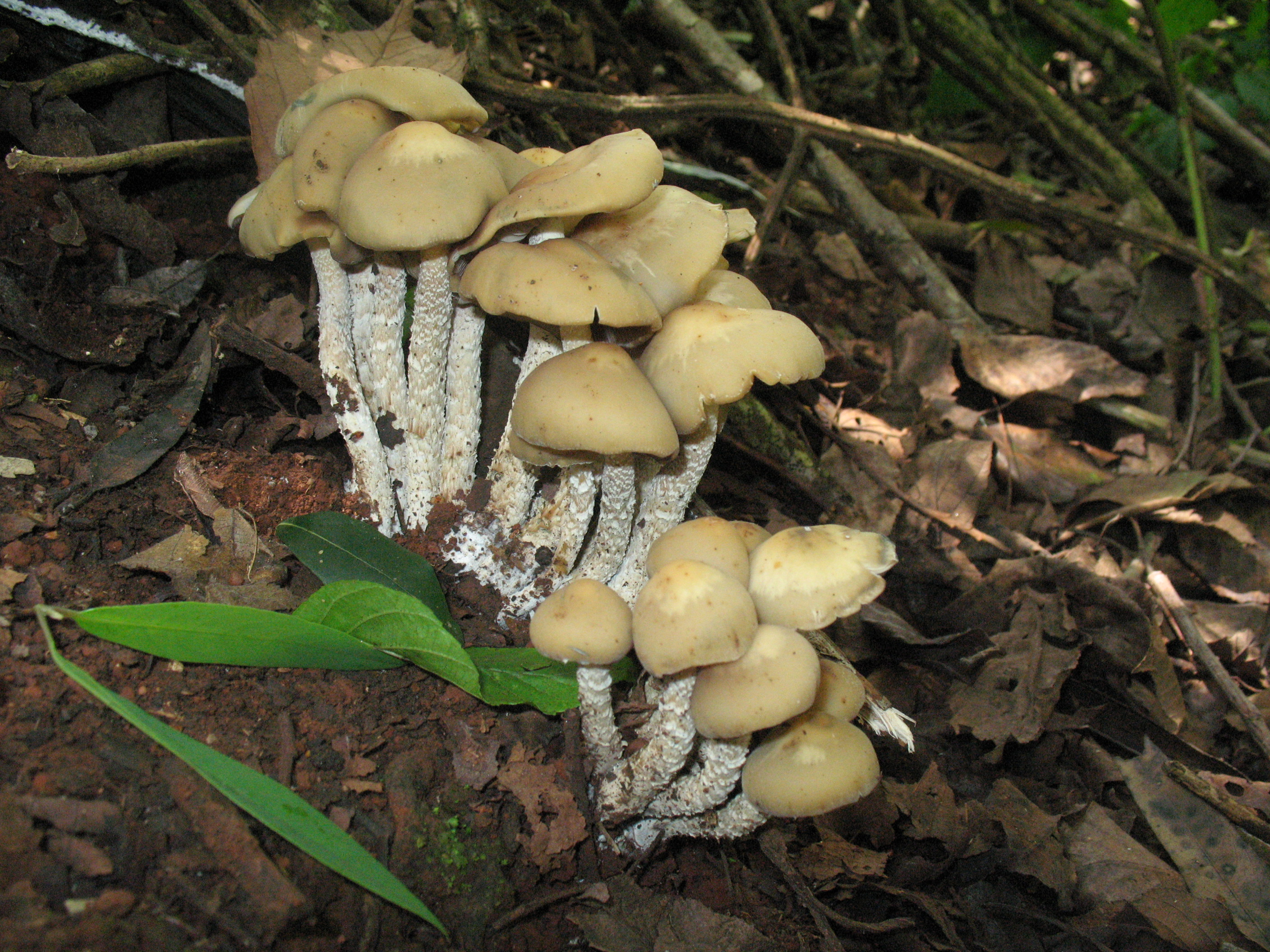
Psilocybe zapotecorum, a hallucinogenic mushroom

Mushrooms with psychoactive properties have long played a role in various native medicine traditions in cultures all around the world. They have been used as sacrament in rituals aimed at mental and physical healing, and to facilitate visionary states. One such ritual is the velada ceremony. A practitioner of traditional mushroom use is the shaman or curandera (priest-healer).

Psilocybin mushrooms, also referred to as psychedelic mushrooms, possess psychedelic properties. Commonly known as "magic mushrooms" or "'shrooms", they are openly available in smart shops in many parts of the world, or on the black market in countries which have outlawed their sale. Psilocybin mushrooms have been reported to facilitate profound and life-changing insights often described as mystical experiences. Recent scientific work has supported these claims, as well as the long-lasting effects of such induced spiritual experiences.

There are over 100 psychoactive mushroom species of genus Psilocybe native to regions all around the world.

Psilocybin, a naturally occurring chemical in certain psychedelic mushrooms such as Psilocybe cubensis, is being studied for its ability to help people suffering from psychological disorders, such as obsessive–compulsive disorder. Minute amounts have been reported to stop cluster and migraine headaches. A double-blind study, done by Johns Hopkins Hospital, showed psychedelic mushrooms could provide people an experience with substantial personal meaning and spiritual significance. In the study, one third of the subjects reported ingestion of psychedelic mushrooms was the single most spiritually significant event of their lives. Over two-thirds reported it among their five most meaningful and spiritually significant events. On the other hand, one-third of the subjects reported extreme anxiety. However the anxiety went away after a short period of time. Psilocybin mushrooms have also shown to be successful in treating addiction, specifically with alcohol and cigarettes.

A few species in the genus Amanita, most recognizably A. muscaria, but also A. pantherina, among others, contain the psychoactive compound muscimol. The muscimol-containing chemotaxonomic group of Amanitas contains no amatoxins or phallotoxins, and as such are not hepatoxic, though if not properly cured will be non-lethally neurotoxic due to the presence of ibotenic acid. The Amanita intoxication is similar to Z-drugs in that it includes CNS depressant and sedative-hypnotic effects, but also dissociation and delirium in high doses.

A third type of hallucinogenic mushroom is hallucinogenic bolete mushrooms such as Lanmaoa asiatica, which are said to cause people to experience Lilliputian hallucinations. These mushrooms have unknown constituents and an unknown mechanism of action, but appear to be distinct in their properties and effects from other hallucinogenic mushrooms and are currently being researched.

=== Folk medicine ===
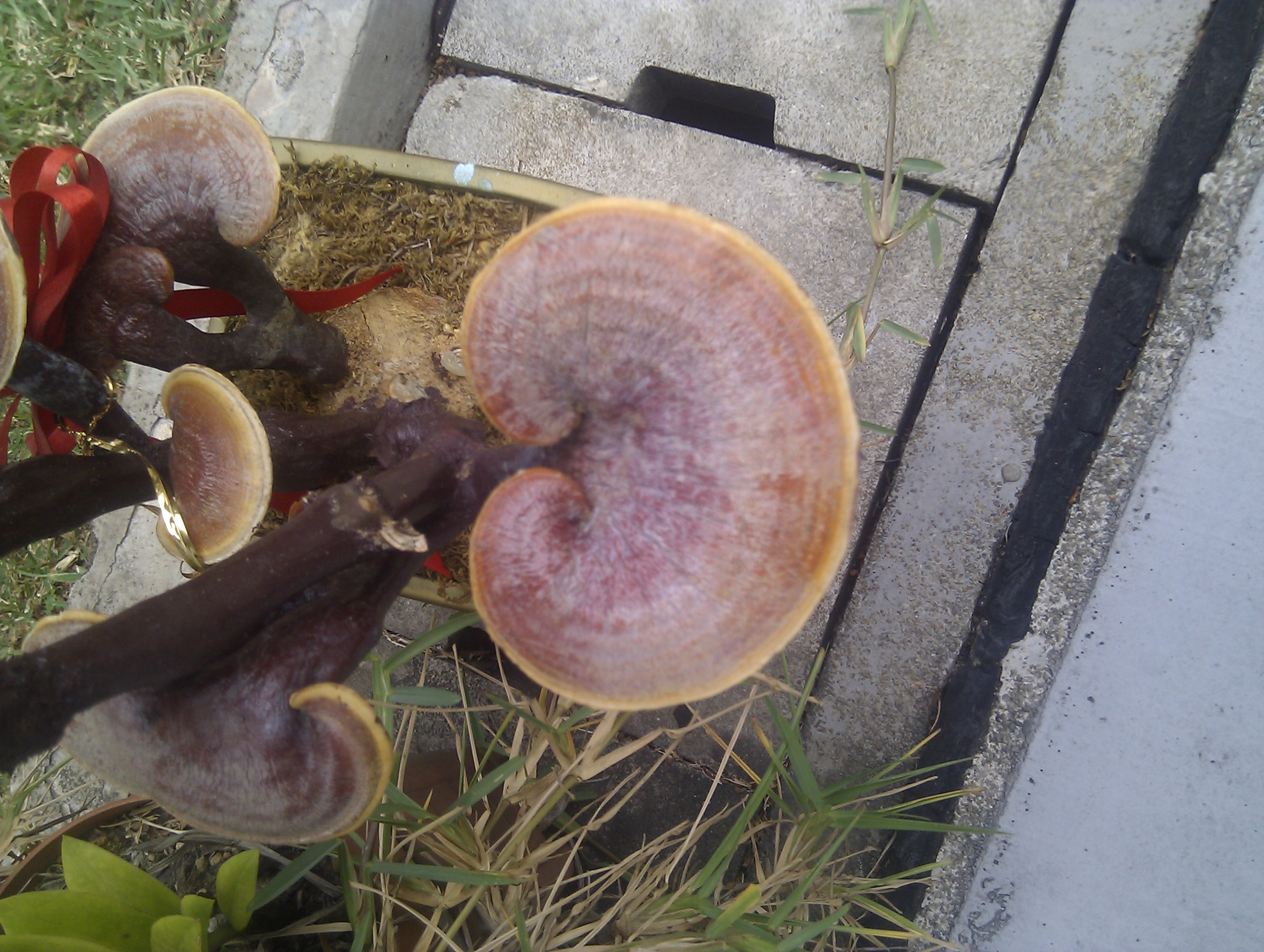
Ganoderma lingzhi

Some mushrooms are used in folk medicine. In a few countries, extracts, such as polysaccharide-K, schizophyllan, polysaccharide peptide, or lentinan, are government-registered adjuvant cancer therapies, but clinical evidence for efficacy and safety of these extracts in humans has not been confirmed. Although some mushroom species or their extracts may be consumed for therapeutic effects, some regulatory agencies, such as the US Food and Drug Administration, regard such use as a dietary supplement, which does not have government approval or common clinical use as a prescription drug.

=== Other uses ===
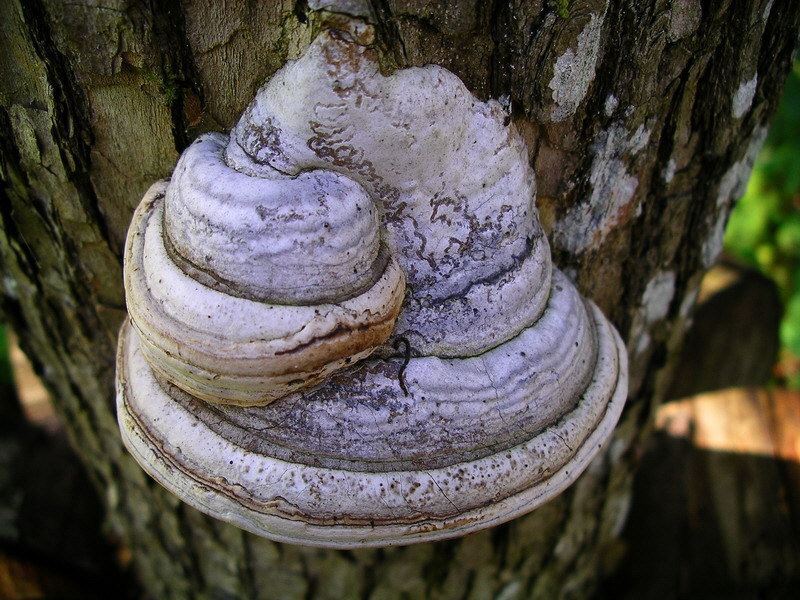
A tinder fungus, Fomes fomentarius

Mushrooms can be used for dyeing wool and other natural fibers. The chromophores of mushroom dyes are organic compounds and produce strong and vivid colors, and all colors of the spectrum can be achieved with mushroom dyes. Before the invention of synthetic dyes, mushrooms were the source of many textile dyes.

Some fungi, types of polypores loosely called mushrooms, have been used as fire starters (known as tinder fungi).

Mushrooms and other fungi play a role in the development of new biological remediation techniques (e.g., using mycorrhizae to spur plant growth) and filtration technologies (e.g. using fungi to lower bacterial levels in contaminated water).

There is an ongoing research in the field of genetic engineering aimed towards creation of the enhanced qualities of mushrooms for such domains as nutritional value enhancement, as well as medical use.

== Gallery ==
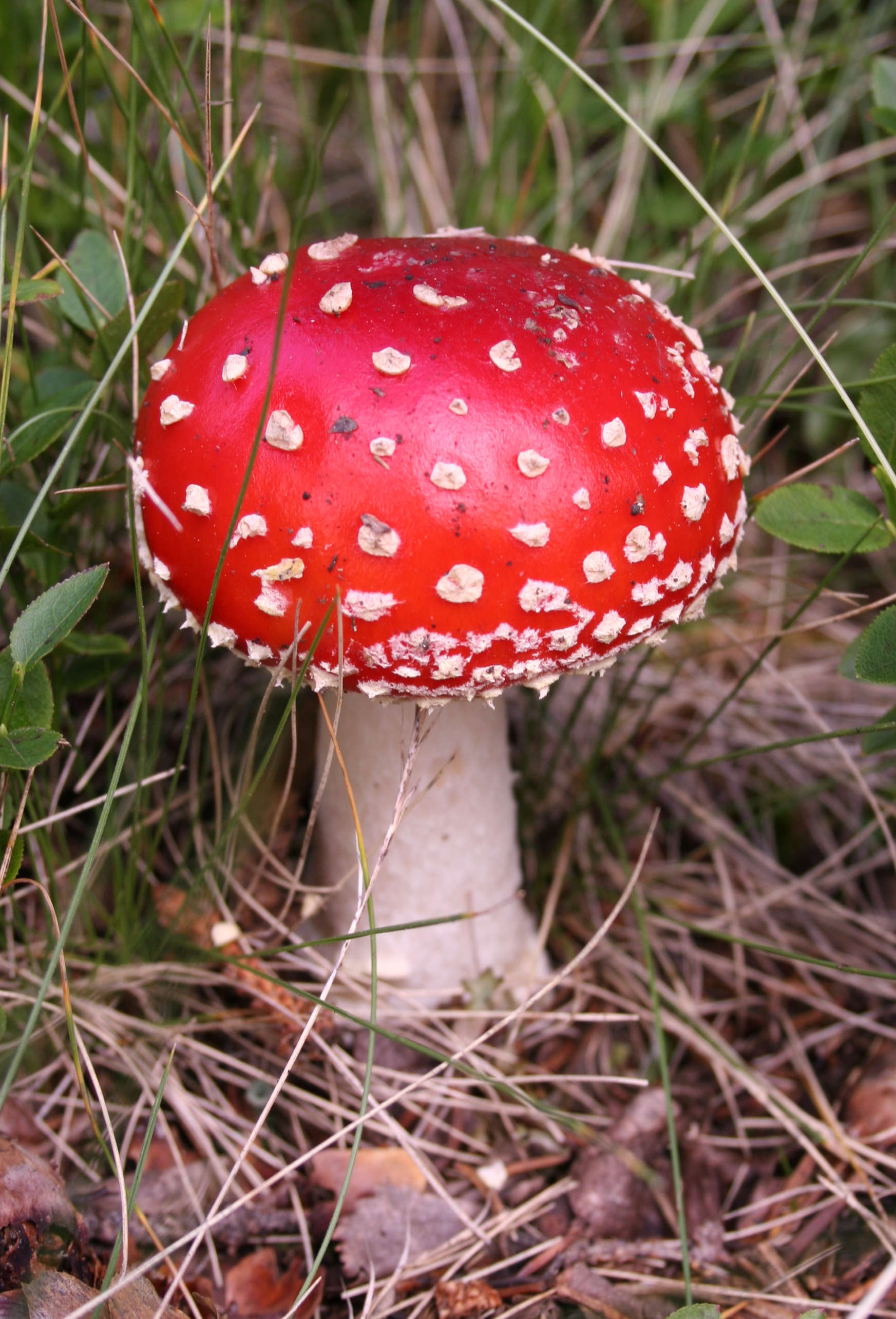
Amanita muscaria, a psychotropic mushroom commonly known as "fly agaric"

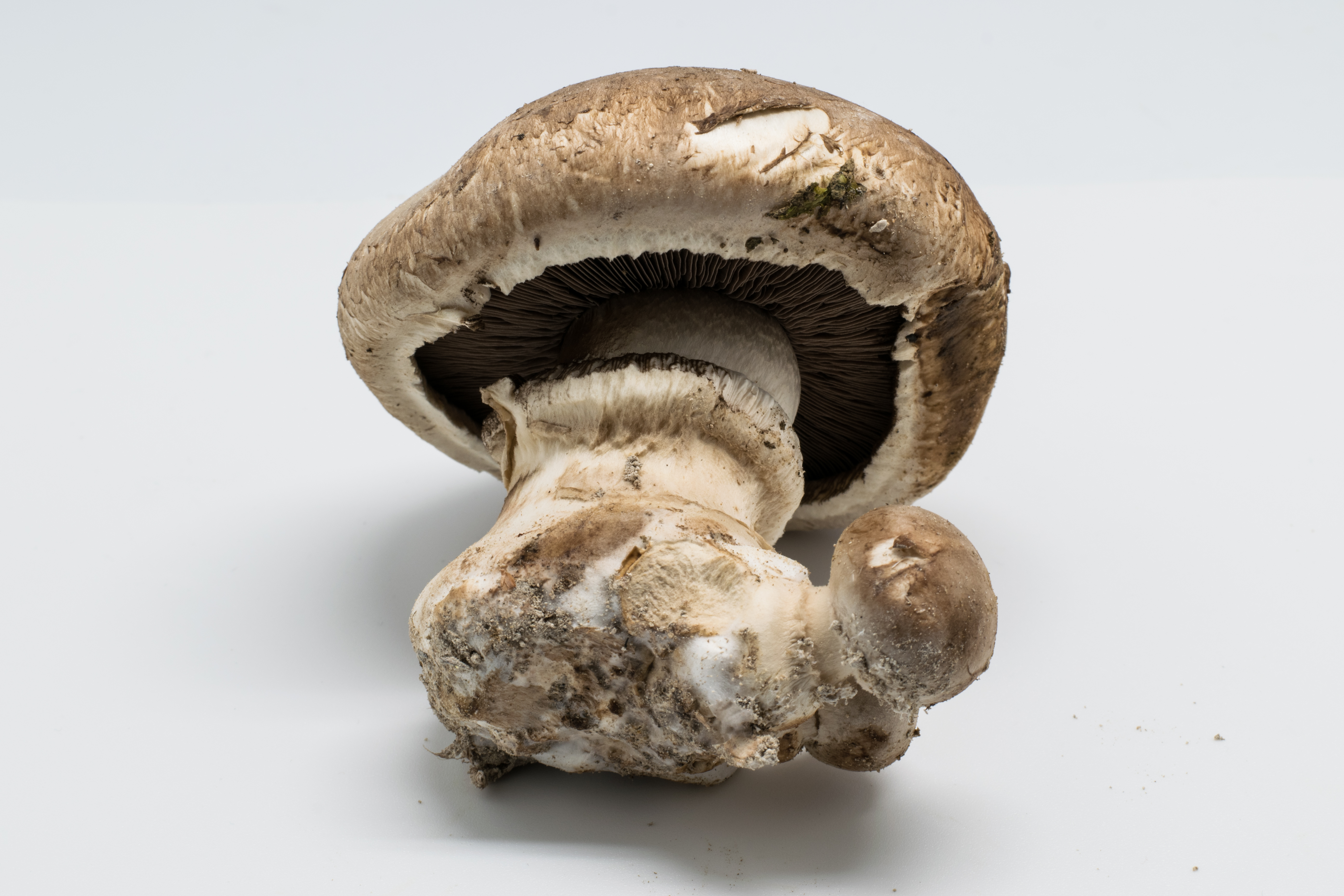
Agaricus bisporus, a cultivated edible mushroom with various names including "button mushroom", "portobello" and "champignon"

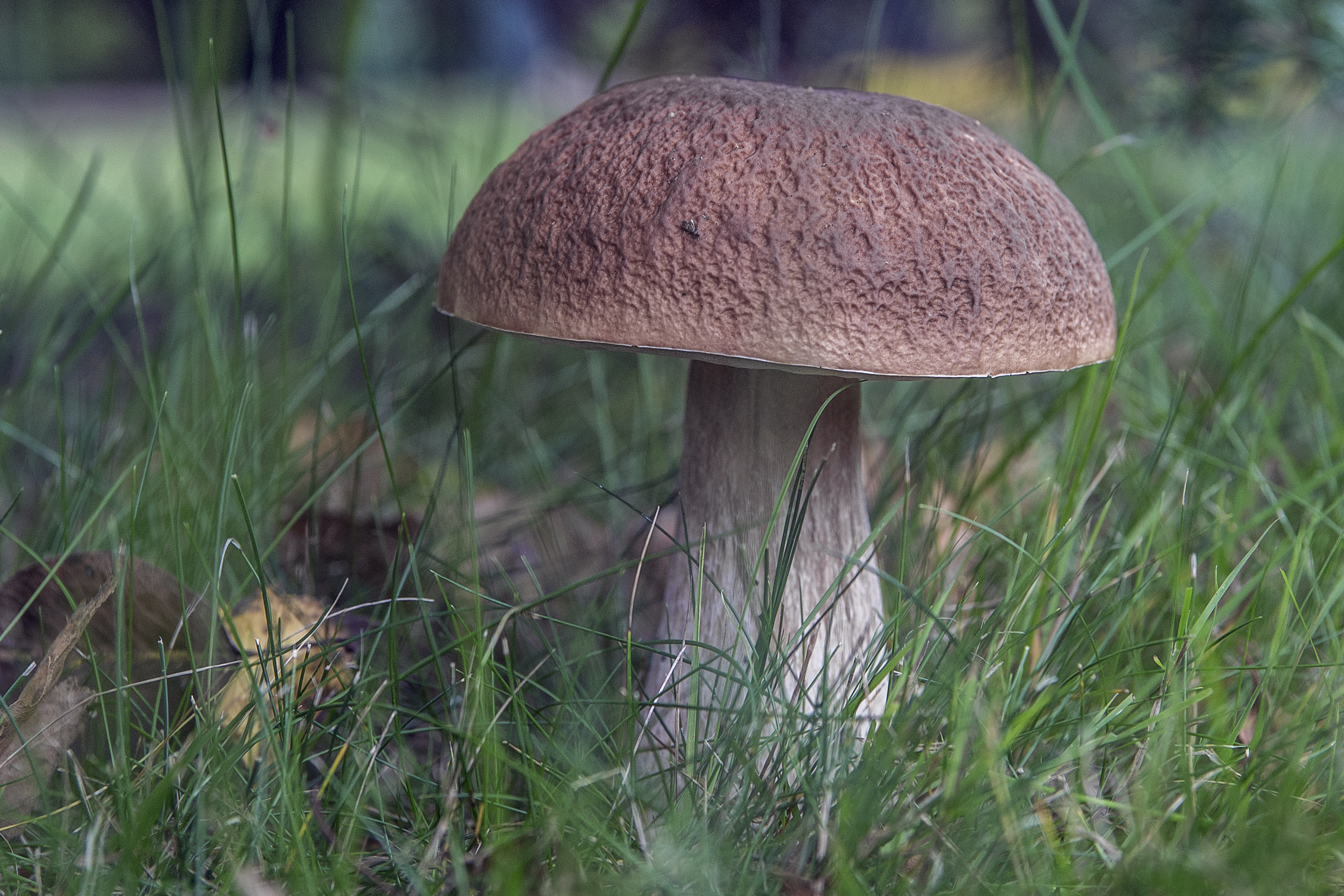
Boletus edulis, also known as "cep", an edible wild bolete found in Europe

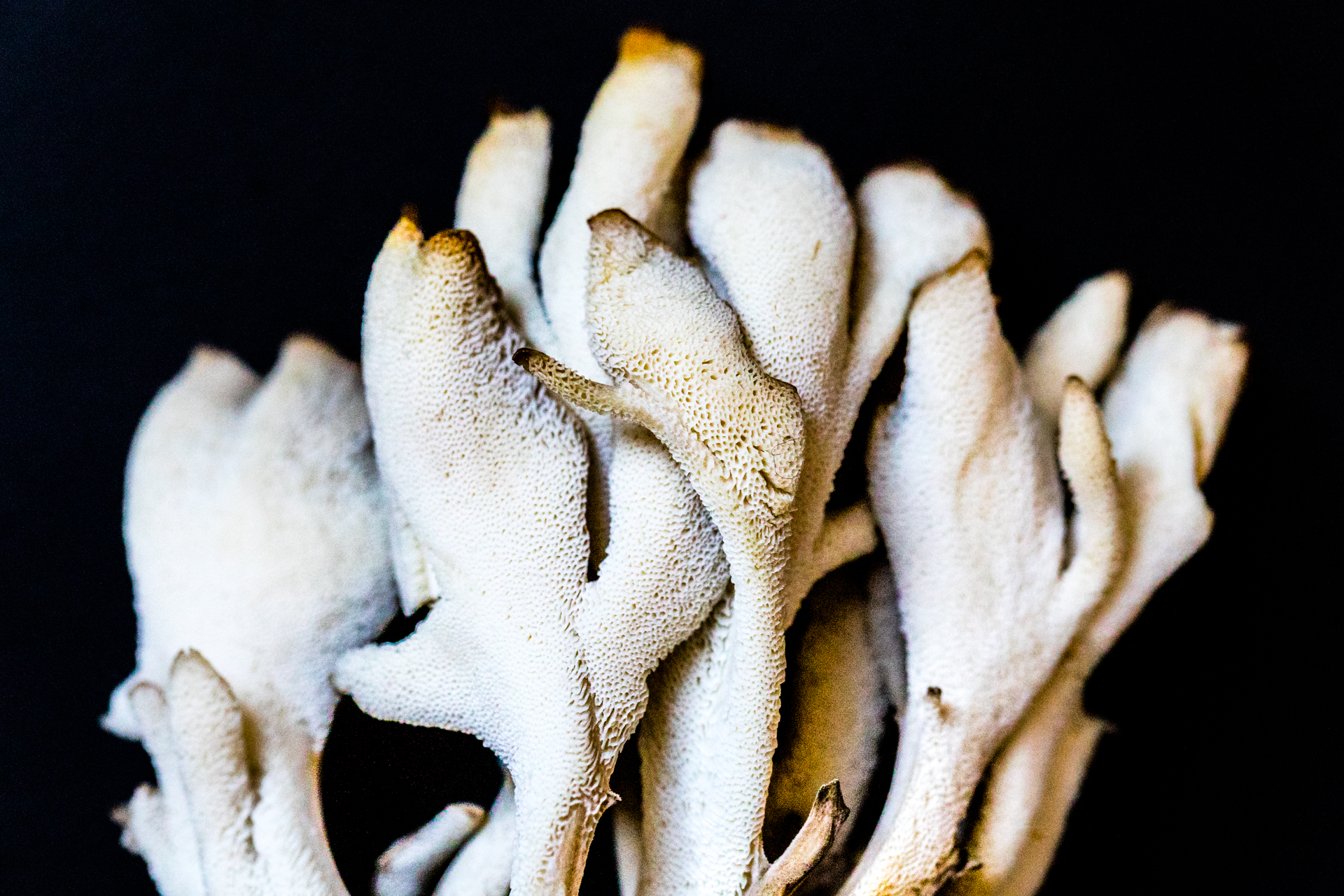
Maitake, a polypore mushroom

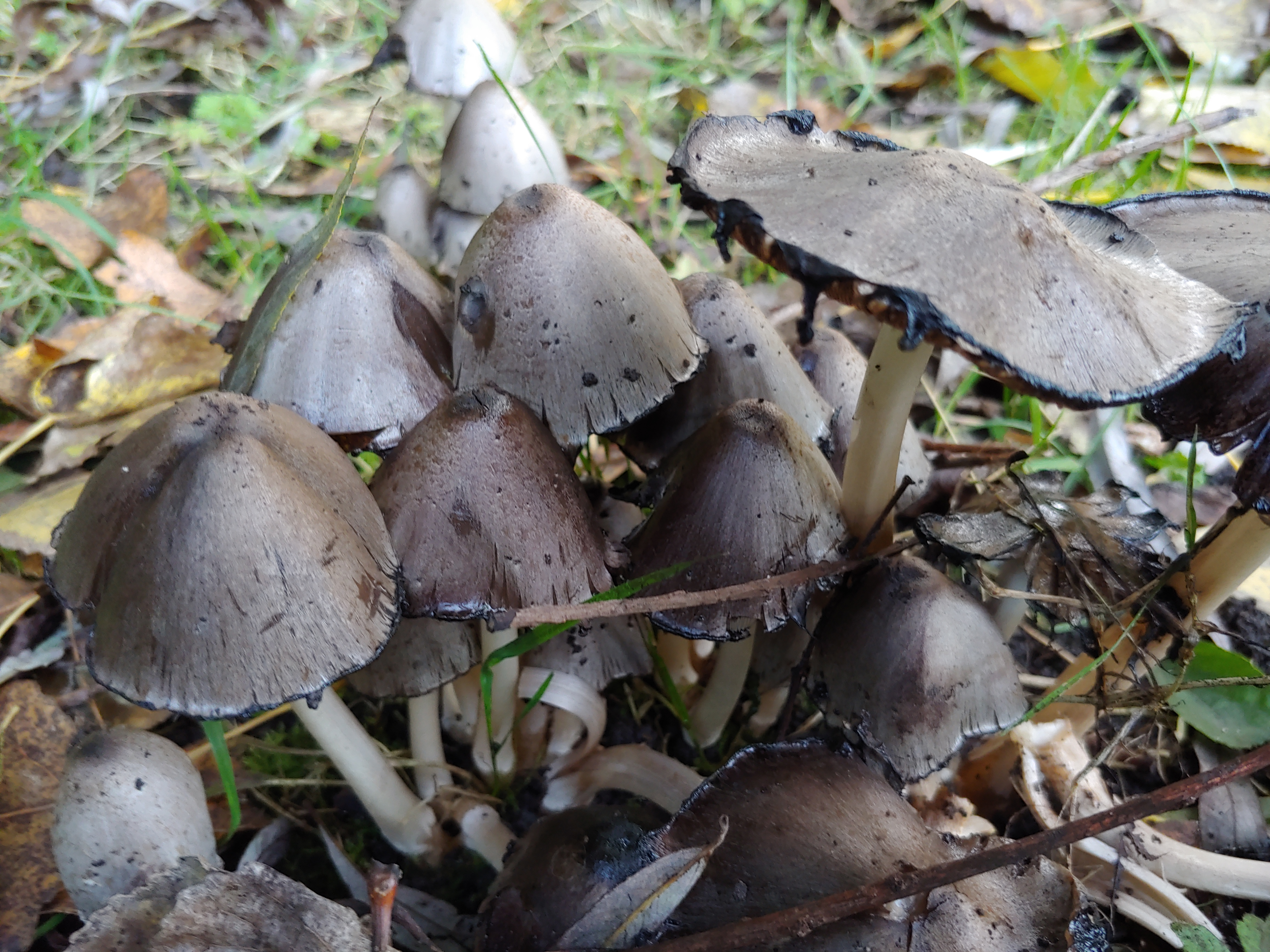
Coprinopsis atramentaria, commonly known as the "ink cap"

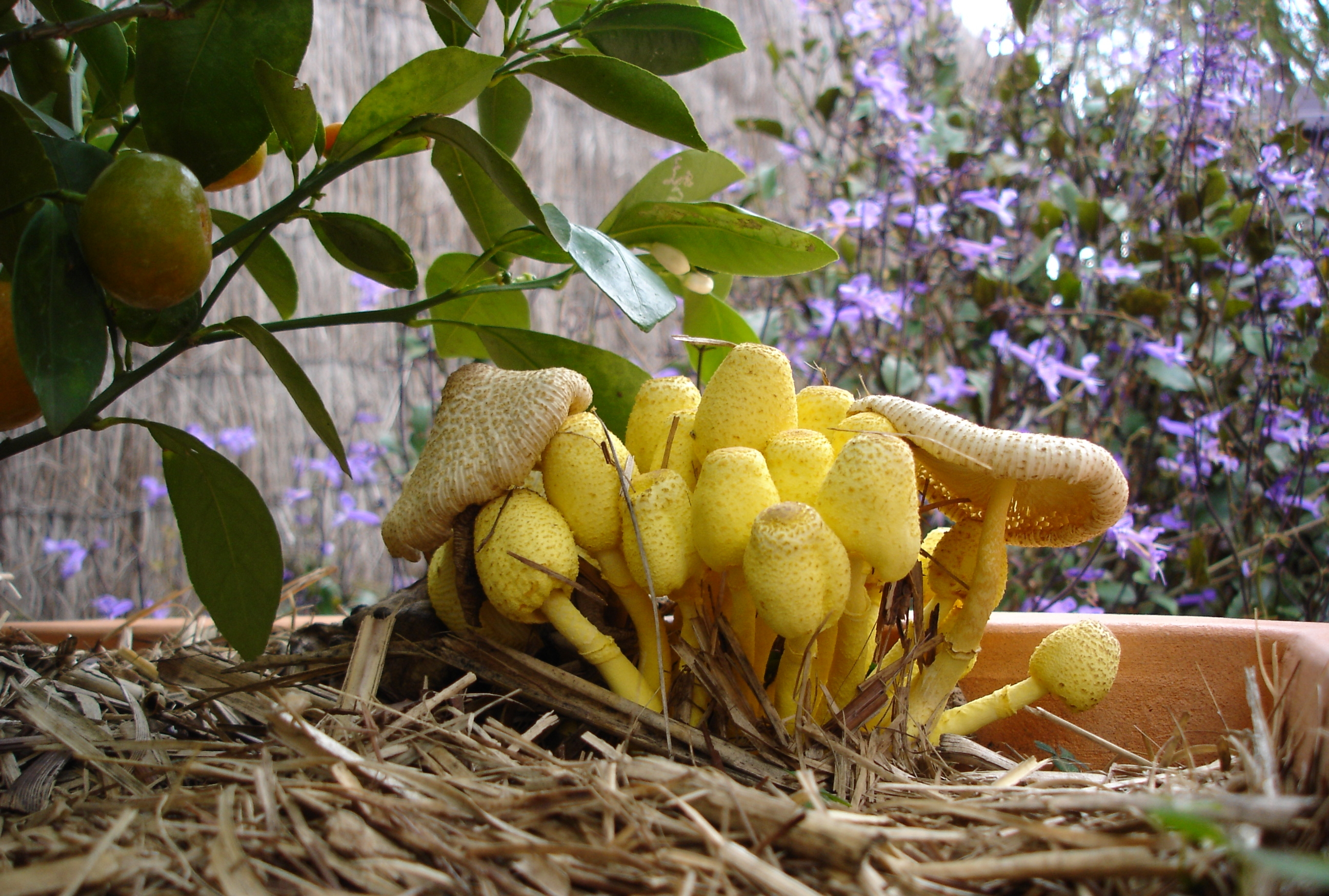
Leucocoprinus birnbaumii, commonly known as the "flowerpot parasol", at various stages of development

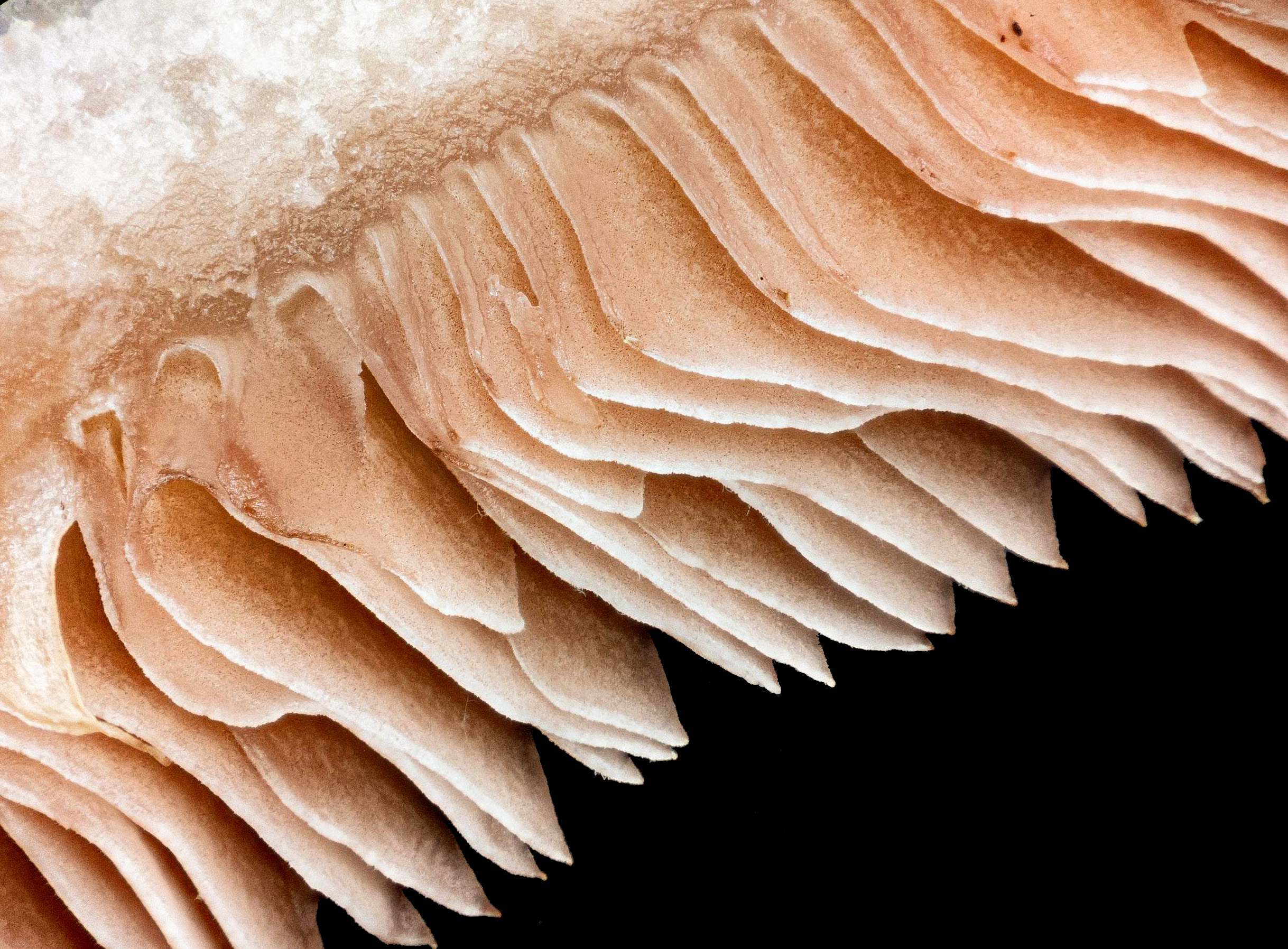
Close-up cross section of mushroom gills

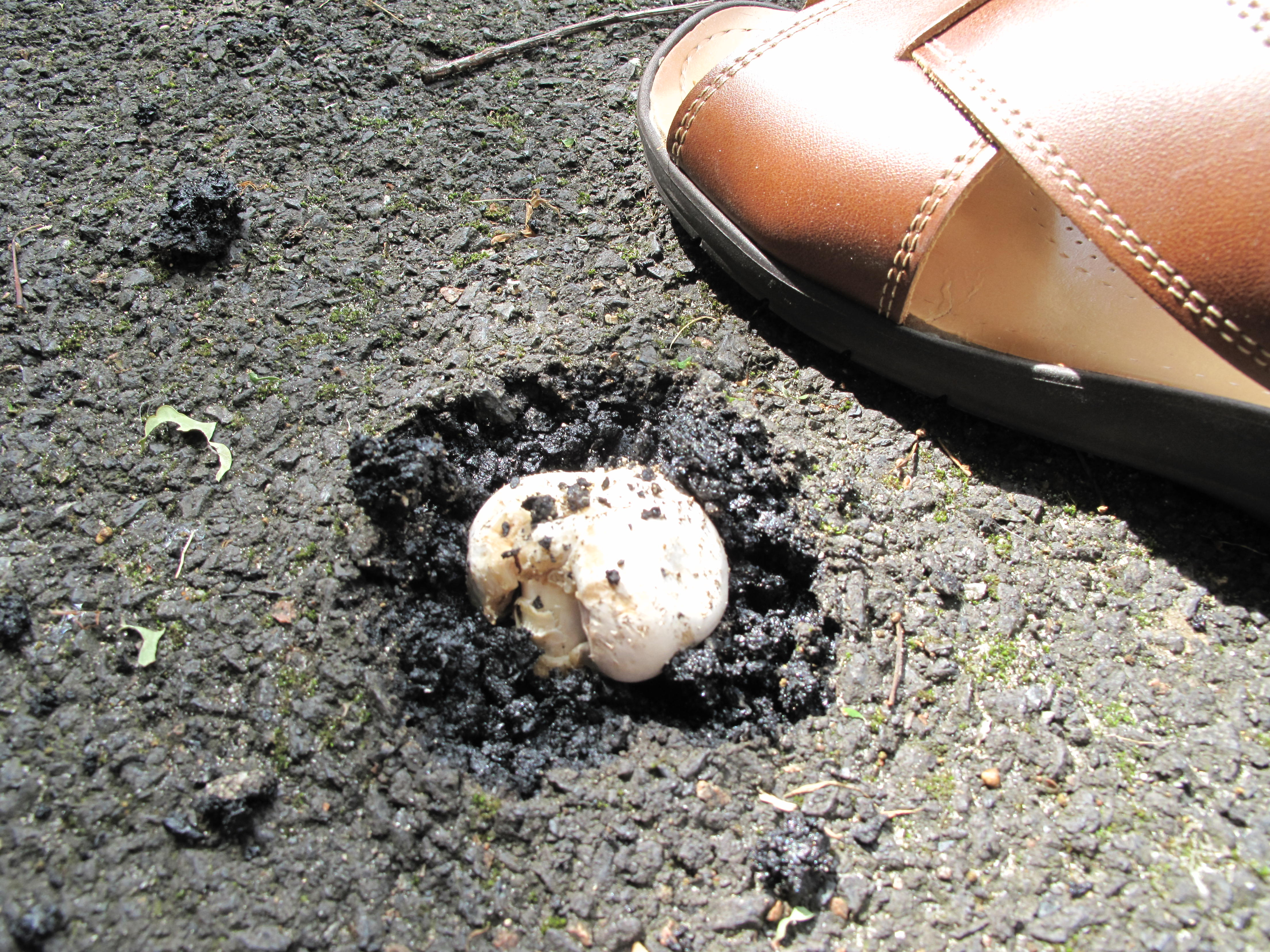
Agaricus bitorquis (the "pavement mushroom") emerging through asphalt concrete in summer

== See also ==
- List of Chinese mushrooms and fungi
- List of mushroom dishes
- List of psilocybin mushroom species
- Largest fungal fruit bodies
- Lists of fungal species
- Mushrooms in art
