= Oliver Lang =

American professional paintball player

Personal information
- Nationality: American
- Born: Oliver William Lang; January 4, 1983 (age 43) San Francisco, California, U.S.
- Occupation(s): Professional paintball player, entrepreneur
- Years active: 1997–present

Sport
- Sport: Paintball
- Team: San Diego Dynasty; Los Angeles Ironmen
Medal record
Men's Paintball
Representing United States
NXL World Cup
Gold medal – first place	San Diego Dynasty	2002, 2003, 2004, 2005, 2022
Gold medal – first place	Los Angeles Ironmen	2007, 2008
Hall of Icons
	2023

Oliver "Ollie" Lang (born January 4, 1983) is an American professional paintball player. Widely regarded as the greatest player in the history of the sport, Lang has won over 50 professional titles across several decades. He is a founding member of San Diego Dynasty and was the first player in the sport's history to receive a $100,000 individual contract salary.

== Career ==
=== San Diego Dynasty and early success (1997–2005) ===
Lang began playing competitively in 1997 with the "Ironkids." In 2002, he co-founded San Diego Dynasty with childhood friends including Ryan Greenspan and Alex Fraige. The team won their first professional World Cup in 2001 and became a dominant force in the NPPL and PSP circuits. By age 19, Lang was named "Player of the Year" by multiple international paintball magazines.

=== Los Angeles Ironmen (2006–2010) ===
In 2006, Lang made industry history by leaving Dynasty to join the Los Angeles Ironmen for a contract valued at $100,000 per year. He led the Ironmen to back-to-back World Cup victories in 2007 and 2008 before returning to Dynasty in 2011.

=== Return to competition and Hormesis (2011–present) ===
After rejoining Dynasty, Lang helped the team secure its 50th professional win at the 2011 NPPL Huntington Beach event. Following a period of semi-retirement starting in 2017, he co-founded Hormesis Paintball, a lifestyle and equipment brand. In 2022, he returned for the NXL World Cup, winning the championship and earning Finals MVP honors.

== Major Championship Wins ==
Year	Event	Team	League
2001	World Cup	San Diego Dynasty	NPPL
2002	World Cup	San Diego Dynasty	PSP
2003	World Cup	San Diego Dynasty	PSP
2004	World Cup	San Diego Dynasty	PSP
2005	World Cup	San Diego Dynasty	PSP
2007	World Cup	Los Angeles Ironmen	PSP
2008	World Cup	Los Angeles Ironmen	PSP
2022	World Cup	San Diego Dynasty	NXL
