= PSPP (disambiguation) =

PSPP is an open source statistics software.

PSPP may also refer to:

- Paul St-Pierre Plamondon (born 1977), Canadian politician
- PSPP Padang Panjang (PSPP; Indonesian: Persatuan Sepakbola Padang Panjang), an Indonesian soccer team, from Padang Panjang, West Sumatra, Sumatra Island, Indonesia
- Peruvian Hairless Dog (PSPP; Spanish: Perro Sin Pelo del Perú), a dog breed from Peru
- Panglima Setia Pasukan Polis (post-nominal letters: "P.S.P.P."; English: Loyal Commander of the Most Galant Police Order of Malaysia), one of the orders, decorations, and medals of Malaysia of the Royal Malaysia Police
- Public Service Pension Plan of Ontario (PSPP), provided through the Ontario Pension Board

== See also ==
- PSP (disambiguation)
- PSP2 (disambiguation)
