= PSPS =

PSPS may refer to:

- PSPS Pekanbaru, an Indonesian professional football club
- Private Sector Participation Scheme, a public housing programme in Hong Kong
- Paddle Steamer Preservation Society, a British steamship preservation group
- Persistent spinal pain syndrome, chronic pain following spinal surgeries
- Pearl Street Power Station, a historically important power plant used by Thomas Edison

== See also ==
- PSP (disambiguation)
