= Polysaccharide-K =

Protein-bound polysaccharide

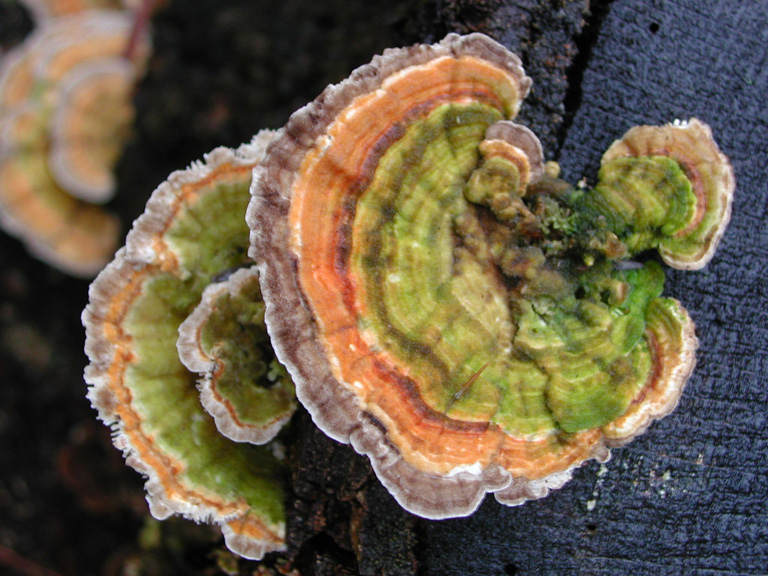
Trametes versicolor, the mushroom from which PSK was isolated.

Polysaccharide-K (Krestin, PSK) is a protein-bound polysaccharide isolated from the mycelium of Trametes versicolor.

Although PSK is approved in Japan as an adjuvant therapy in cancer treatment, it is not approved in the United States for treatment of cancer or any clinical condition.

== Research ==
There is little evidence that turkey tail mushroom extracts or PSK are useful for treating cancer or any medical condition.

Polysaccharide-K, an extract of T. versicolor, is approved in Japan as an adjuvant therapy in cancer treatment.

== Chemistry ==
PSK is a protein polysaccharide consisting of a beta-glucan β-1,4 main chain with β-1,3 and β-1,6 side chains. The approximate molecular weight of PSK is 100,000 Da, and the protein component is reported at the β-1,6 side chain. PSK is isolated from the "CM-101" strain of Trametes versicolor. The analogous compound PSP, is derived from the "COV-1" strain of Trametes versicolor.

== See also ==
- Polysaccharide peptide
