= PSP =

PSP may refer to:

== Organisations ==
=== Political parties ===
- Former Pak Sarzameen Party, Pakistan
- Former Pacifist Socialist Party (Dutch: Pacifistisch Socialistische Partij), Netherlands
- Partido Socialista Popular (Cuba)
- People's Services Party, Vanuatu
- Former Popular Socialist Party (Argentina) (Spanish: Partido Socialista Popular)
- Post-WWII Popular Socialist Party, Chile
- Former Popular Socialist Party (Haiti) (French: Parti Socialiste Populaire)
- Popular Socialist Party (Mexico) (Spanish: Partido Popular Socialista, PPS)
- Former Popular Socialist Party (Spain) (Spanish: Partido Socialista Popular), merged with Spanish Socialist Workers' Party (PSOE)
- Former Praja Socialist Party, India
- Progress Singapore Party
- Progressive Socialist Party (Arabic: الحزب التقدمي الاشتراكي, al-hizb al-taqadummi al-ishtiraki), Lebanon
- Progressive Socialist Party of Ukraine (Ukrainian: Прогресивна соціалістична партія України, Prohresivna Sotsjalistychna Partiya Ukrayiny)
- Former Progressive Sudanese Party (French: Parti soudanais progressiste), French Sudan (now Mali)
- Former Puerto Rican Socialist Party (Spanish: Partido Socialista Puertorriqueño)

=== Government ===
- Państwowa Straż Pożarna, State Fire Service, Poland
- Pennsylvania State Police, US
- Polícia de Segurança Pública (Public Security Police), Portugal
- Public Sector Pension Investment Board or PSP Investments

== Computing ==
- PlayStation Portable, game console
- PlayStation Portal, handheld gaming accessory
- PaintShop Pro, graphics editor software
- Parallel slave port on some PIC microcontrollers
- Personal software process, development process
- Program Segment Prefix, DOS data structure
- Python Server Pages, for embedding Python in HTML
- AMD Platform Security Processor

== Engineering ==
- Pierced steel planking
- Pneumatic stabilized platform, for large floating structures

== Firearms ==
- Heckler & Koch P7 "Police Self-loading Pistol"

== Science and medicine ==
- Paralytic shellfish poisoning
- Parker Solar Probe
- Excoriation disorder, dermatillomania, or pathological skin picking
- Phenolsulfonphthalein (phenol red), a pH indicator
- Photostimulable phosphor plate, for recording X-rays
- Polydiethylstilbestrol phosphate, an estrogen
- Polysaccharide peptide
- Postsynaptic potential, nerve voltage
- Pressure-sensitive paint
- Primary spine practitioner
- Progressive supranuclear palsy of the brain

== Other ==
- Palm Springs International Airport, IATA airport code
- Payment service provider
- Personal Public Service Number (Irish: Uimhir Phearsanta Seirbhíse Poiblí), Ireland
- Philippine Sign Language, by ISO 639-3 language code
- Physical Security Professional
- Planning and Scheduling Professional, an AACE International certification
- President's Surveillance Program, US
- Pounds, shillings, and pence

== See also ==
- PSPS (disambiguation)
