= Polysaccharide peptide =

Polysaccharide peptide (PSP) is a protein-bound polysaccharide extracted from the edible mushroom Coriolus versicolor. PSP is currently in the animal-testing phase of research in many countries for use as an anti-tumor drug. It appears to work as a biological response modifier (BRM), enhancing the body's own use of macrophages and T-lymphocytes, rather than directly attacking any tumors.

Polysaccharide krestin (PSK) was first isolated in Japan in the late 1960s while PSP was isolated about 1983 in China. Each compound has shown remarkable anticancer properties with few side effects. By 1987 PSK accounted for more than 25% of total national expenditure for anticancer agents in Japan.

== See also ==
Polysaccharide-K
